= Royal Academy Exhibition of 1857 =

1857 art exhibition in London

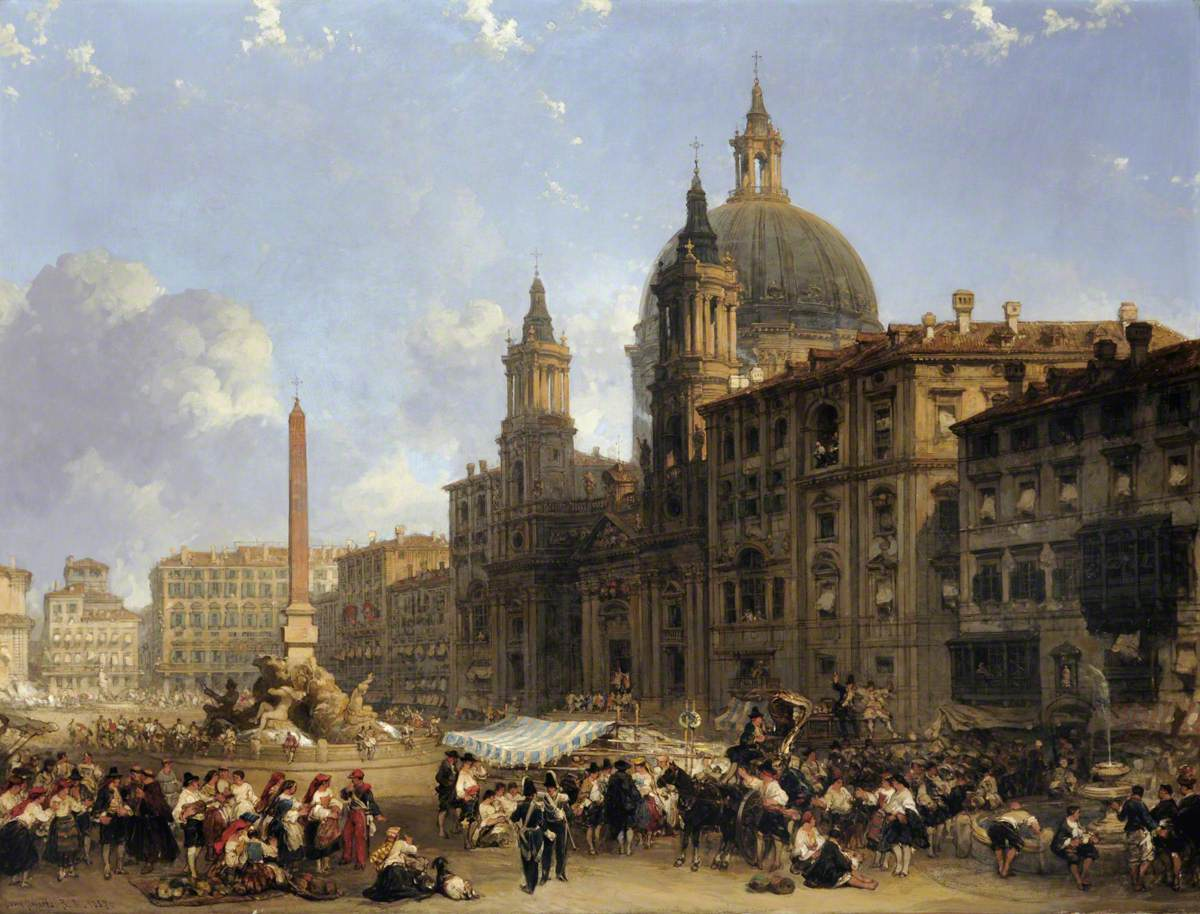
The Piazza Navona at Rome by David Roberts

The Royal Academy Exhibition of 1857 was the eighty ninth annual Summer Exhibition of the British Royal Academy of Arts. It was held at the National Gallery in London between 4 May and 25 July 1857. It coincided with the large Manchester Art Treasures exhibition, while several major artists were too busy working on the redecoration of the rebuilt Houses of Parliament to produce paintings for the Royal Academy, although Daniel Maclise submitted Peter the Great at Deptford Dockyard.

== The Exhibition ==
The Pre-Raphaelite John Everett Millais exhibited three works including News from Home, a scene from the Crimean War. His imagined history painting Sir Isumbras at the Ford divided critical opinion with his former supporter John Ruskin describing it as a "catastrophe". David Roberts submitted several cityscapes including The Piazza Navona at Rome. Clarkson Stanfield's maritime and landscape paintings included views of Saint-Jean-de-Luz in France and the Giant's Causeway in Ireland as well as Calm, in the Gulf of Salerno. William Powell Frith was working on his epic The Derby Day and displayed two smaller works A London Flower Girl and Kate Nickleby at Madame Mantalini's, based on the novel Nicholas Nickleby by his friend Charles Dickens.

Emily Mary Osborn attracted interest for her genre painting Nameless and Friendless showing a struggling young female artist trying to sell her work. The American artist Jasper Francis Cropsey, part of the Hudson River School, displayed An Indian Summer Morning in the White Mountains. In portraiture, Margaret Sarah Carpenter's Portrait of John Gibson featured the well-known sculptor. The future President of the Royal Academy Francis Grant sent in Portrait of Daisy Grant depicted his daughter against a snow-covered background.

== Gallery ==
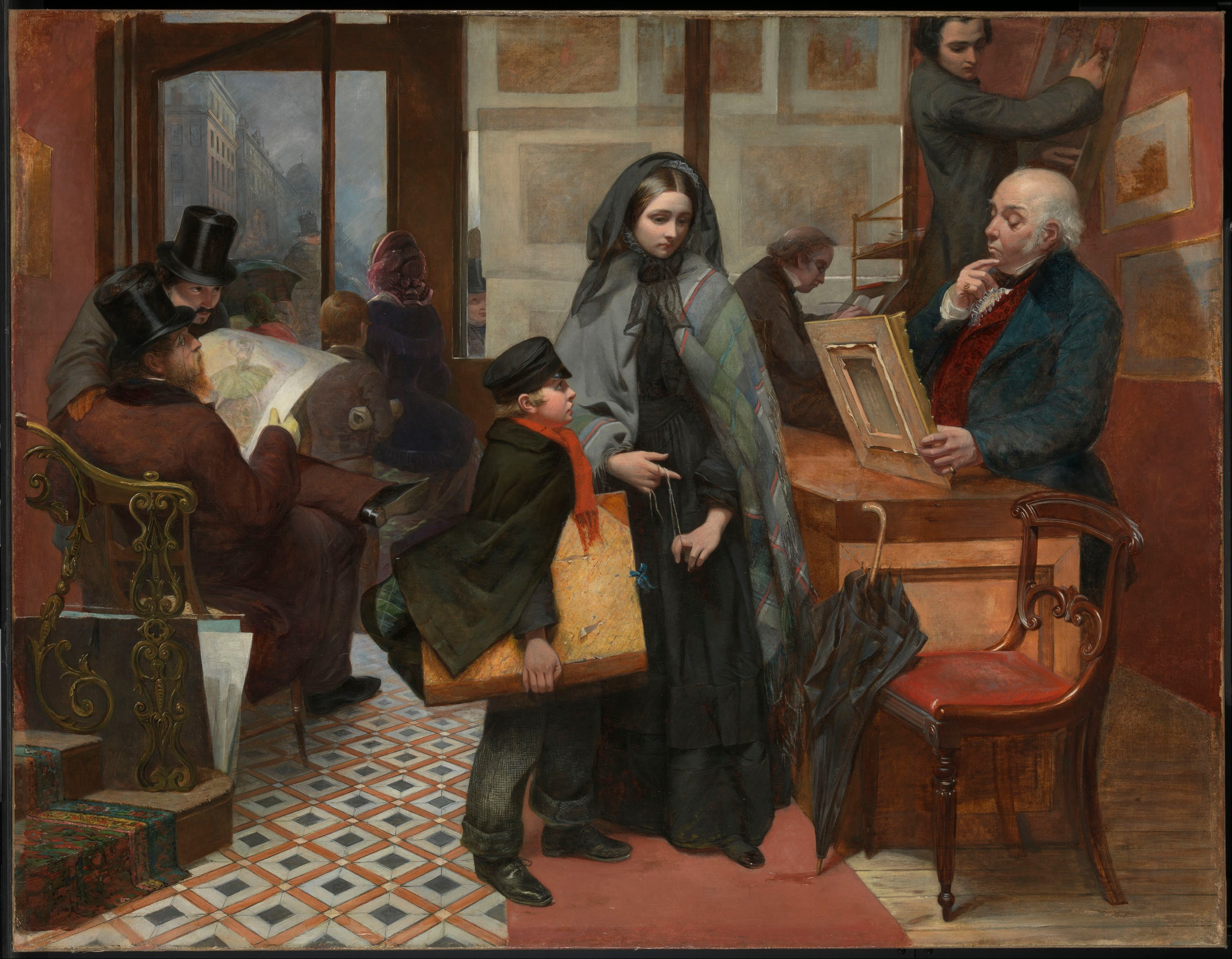
Nameless and Friendless by Emily Mary Osborn

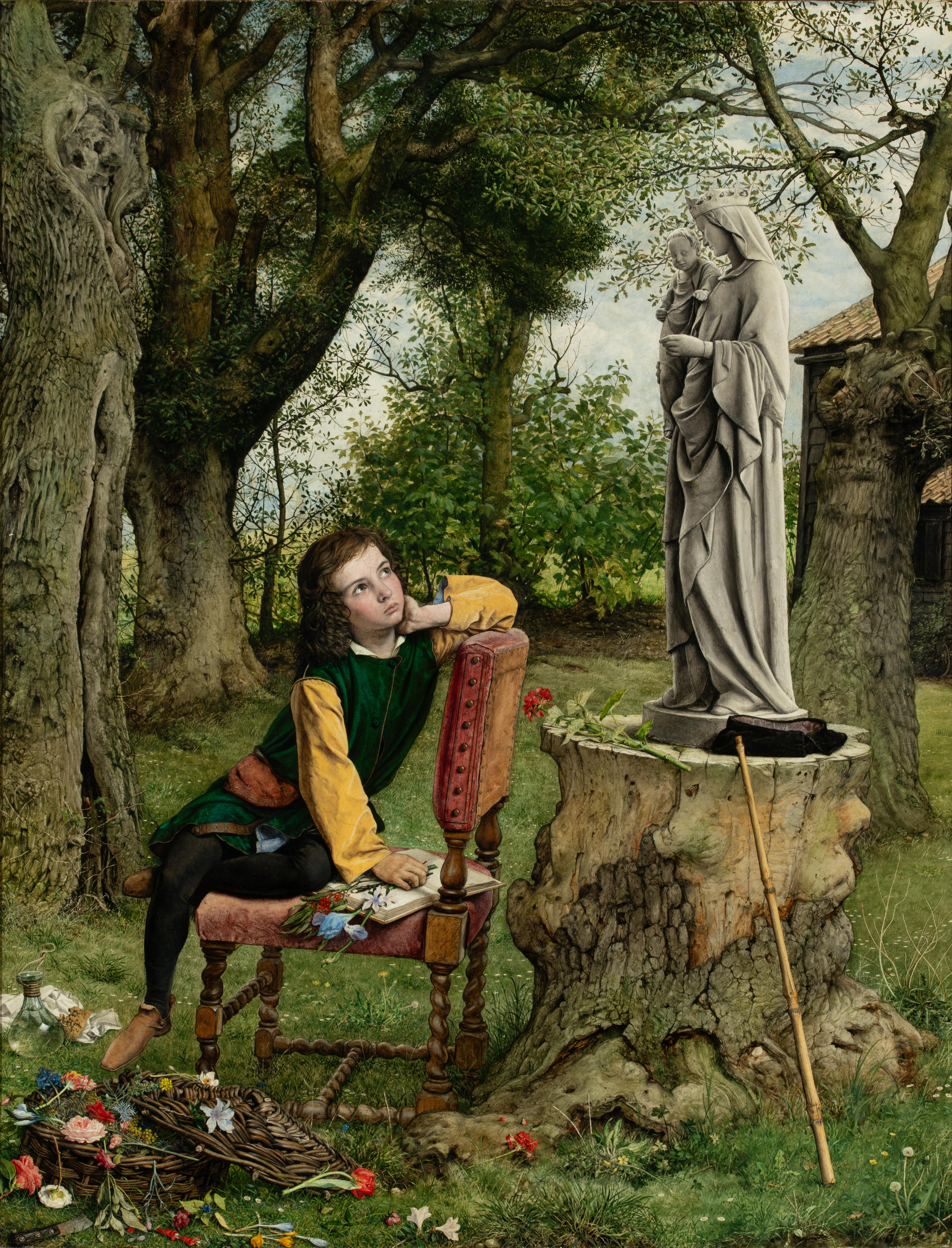
Titian Preparing to make his First Essay in Colouring by William Dyce

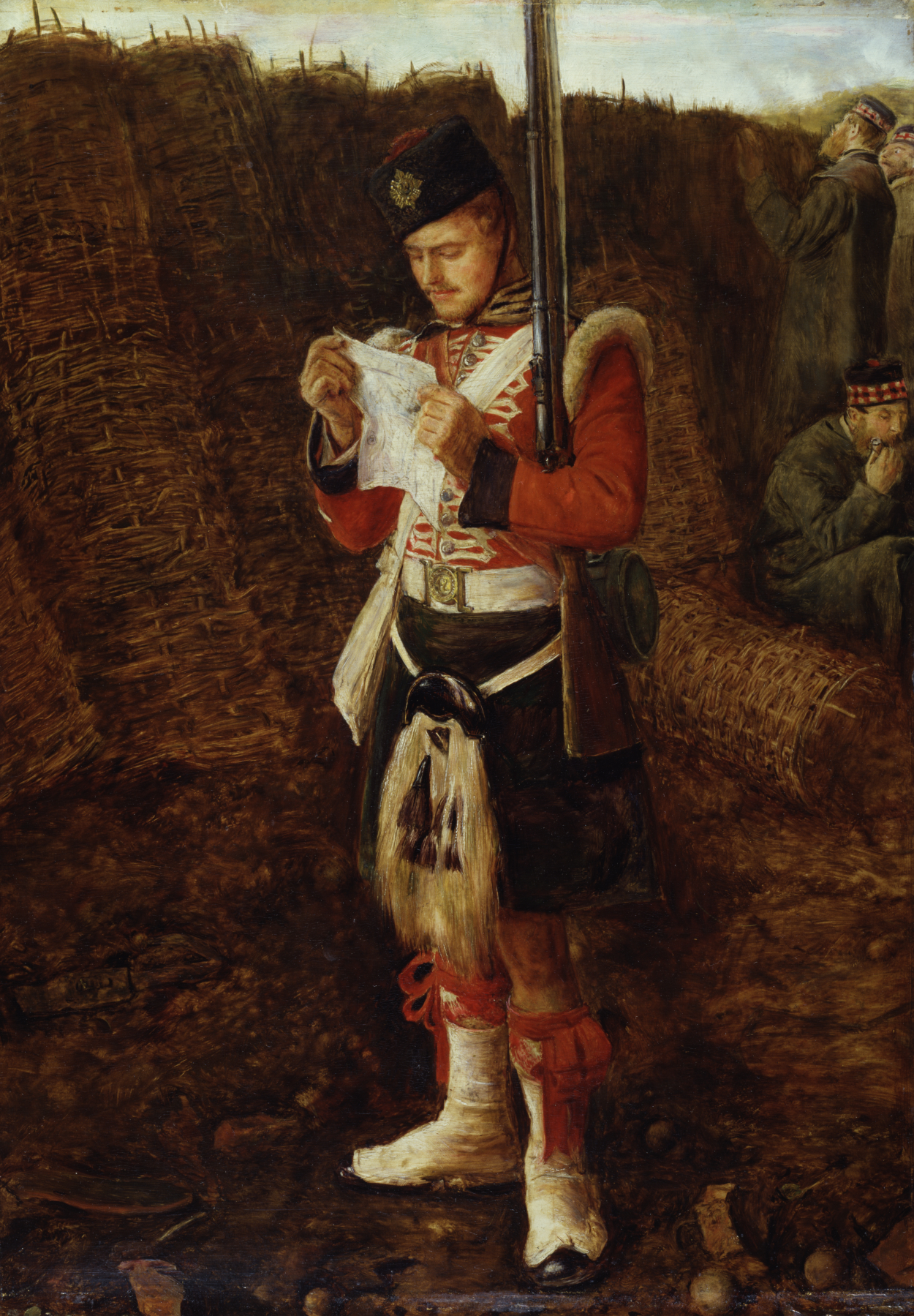
News from Home by John Everett Millais

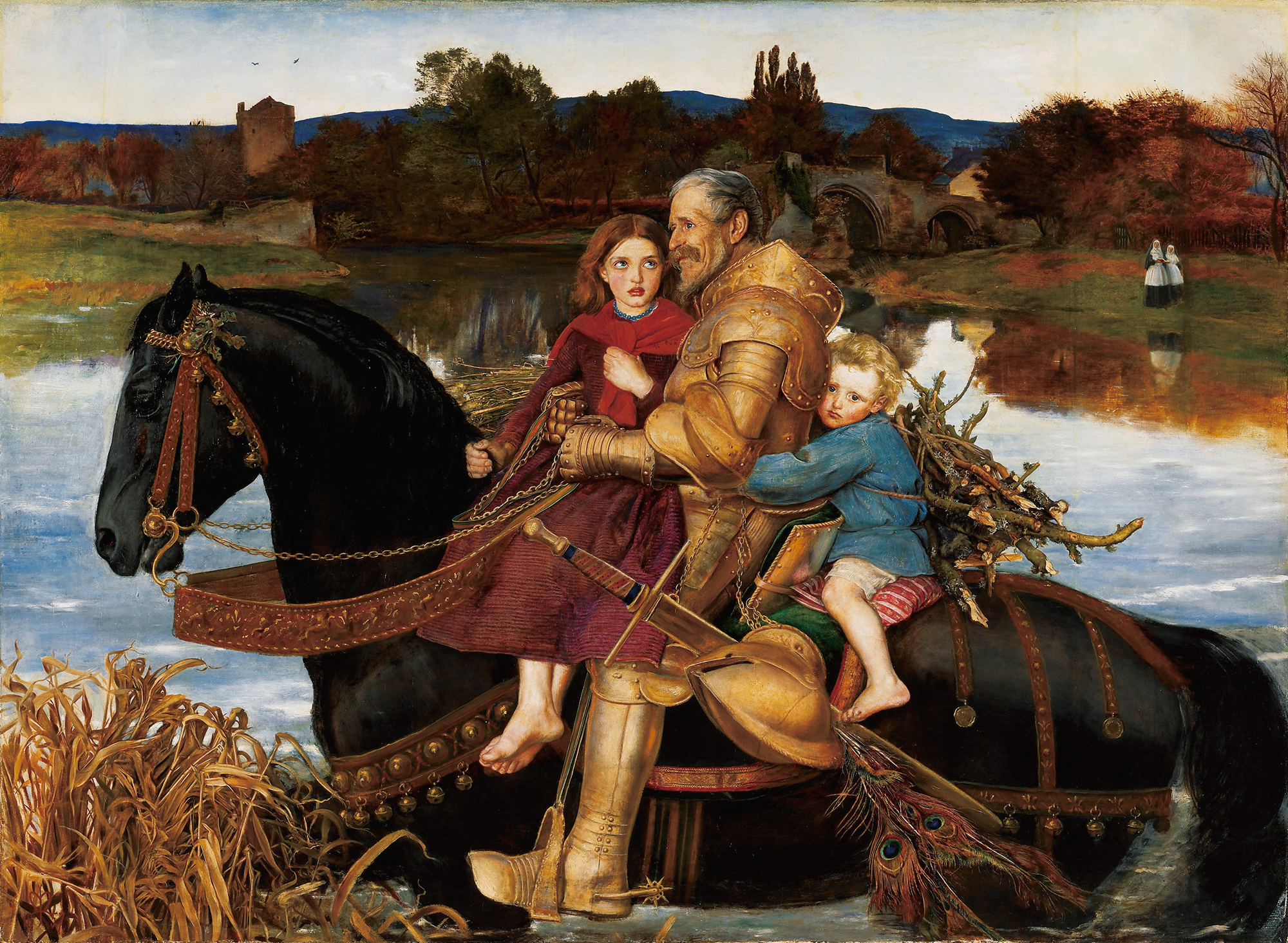
Sir Isumbras at the Ford by John Everett Millais

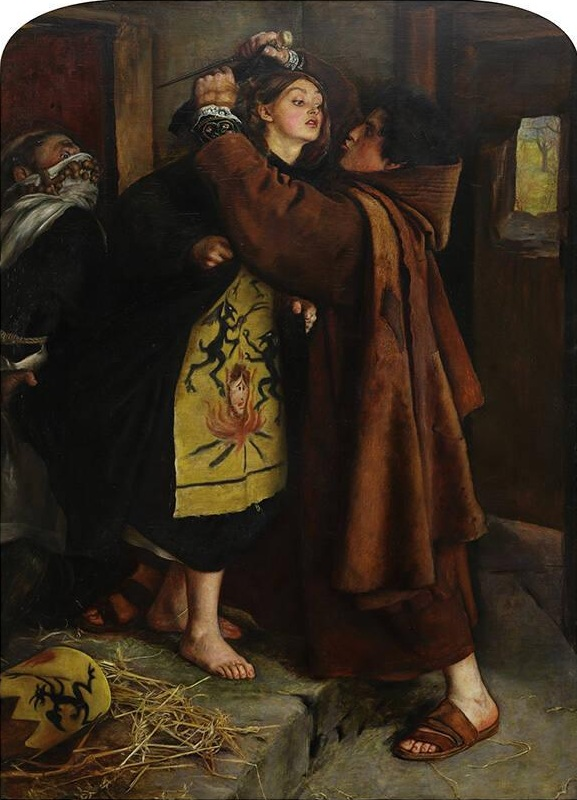
The Escape of a Heretic, 1559 by John Everett Millais

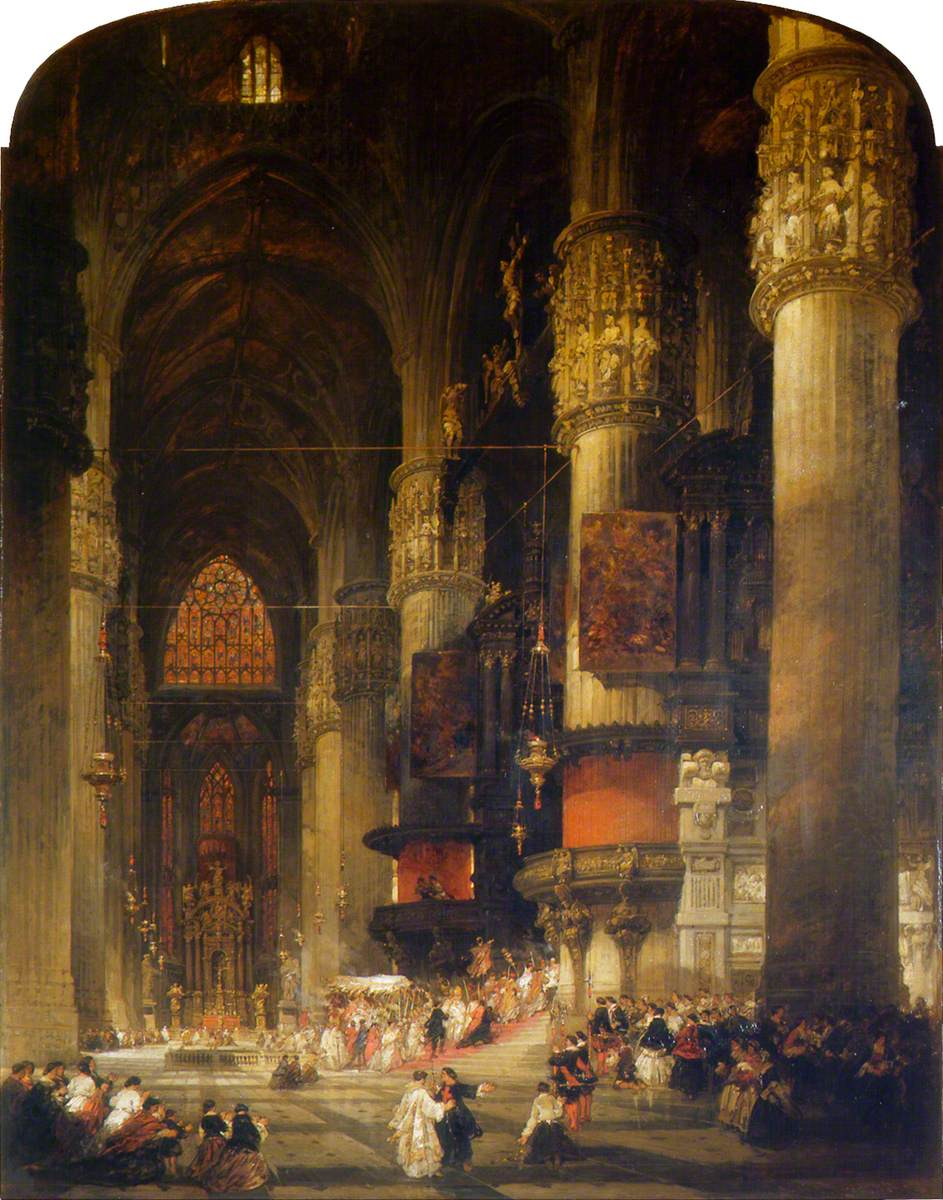
Interior of the Duomo, Milan by David Roberts

Kate Nickleby at Madame Mantalini's by William Powell Frith

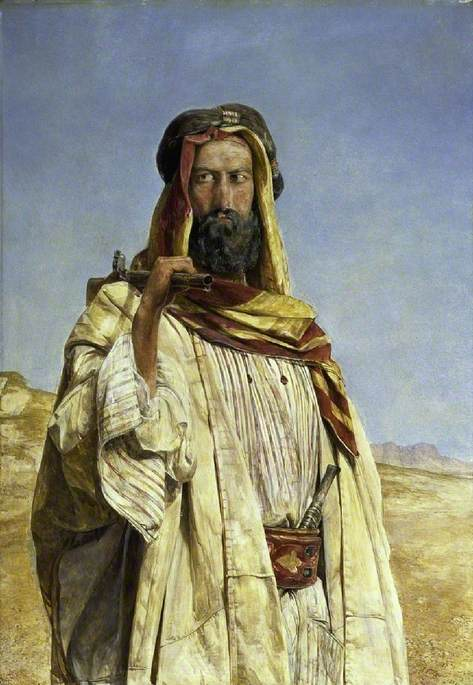
A Syrian Sheik by John Frederick Lewis

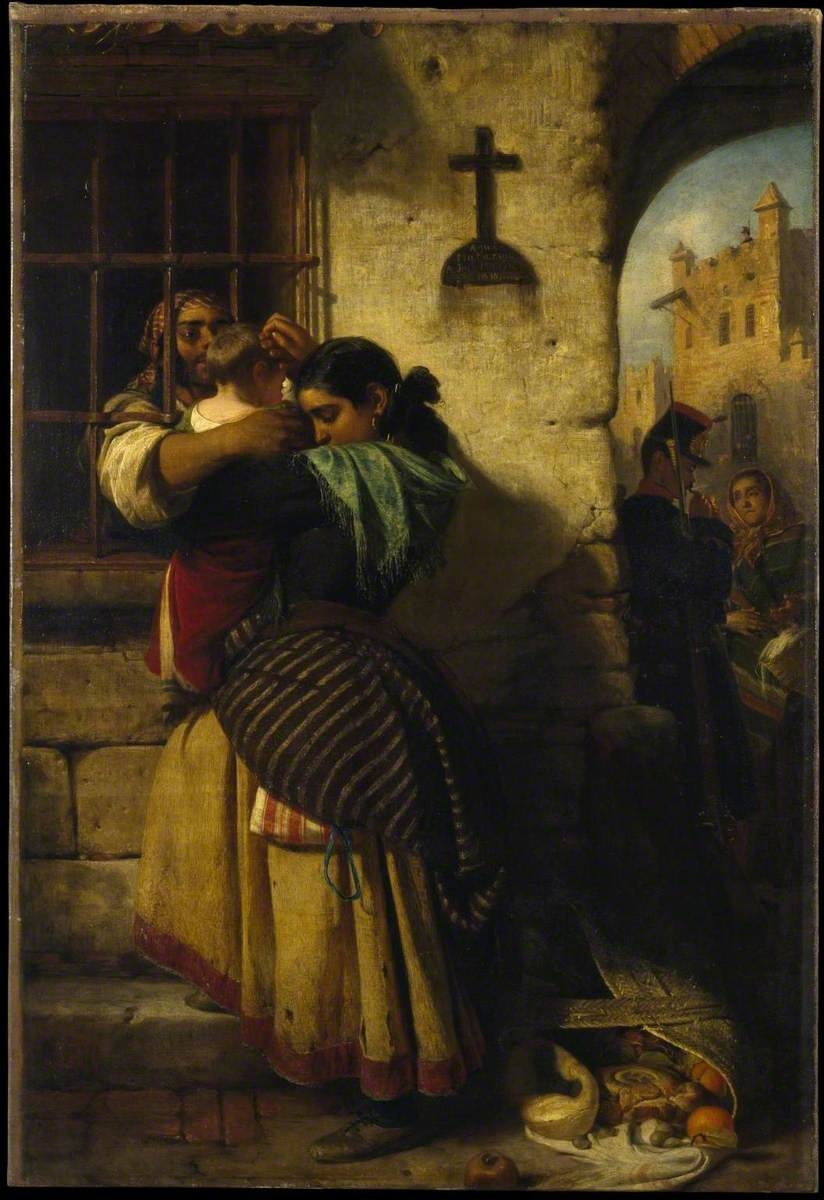
The Prison Window by John Phillip

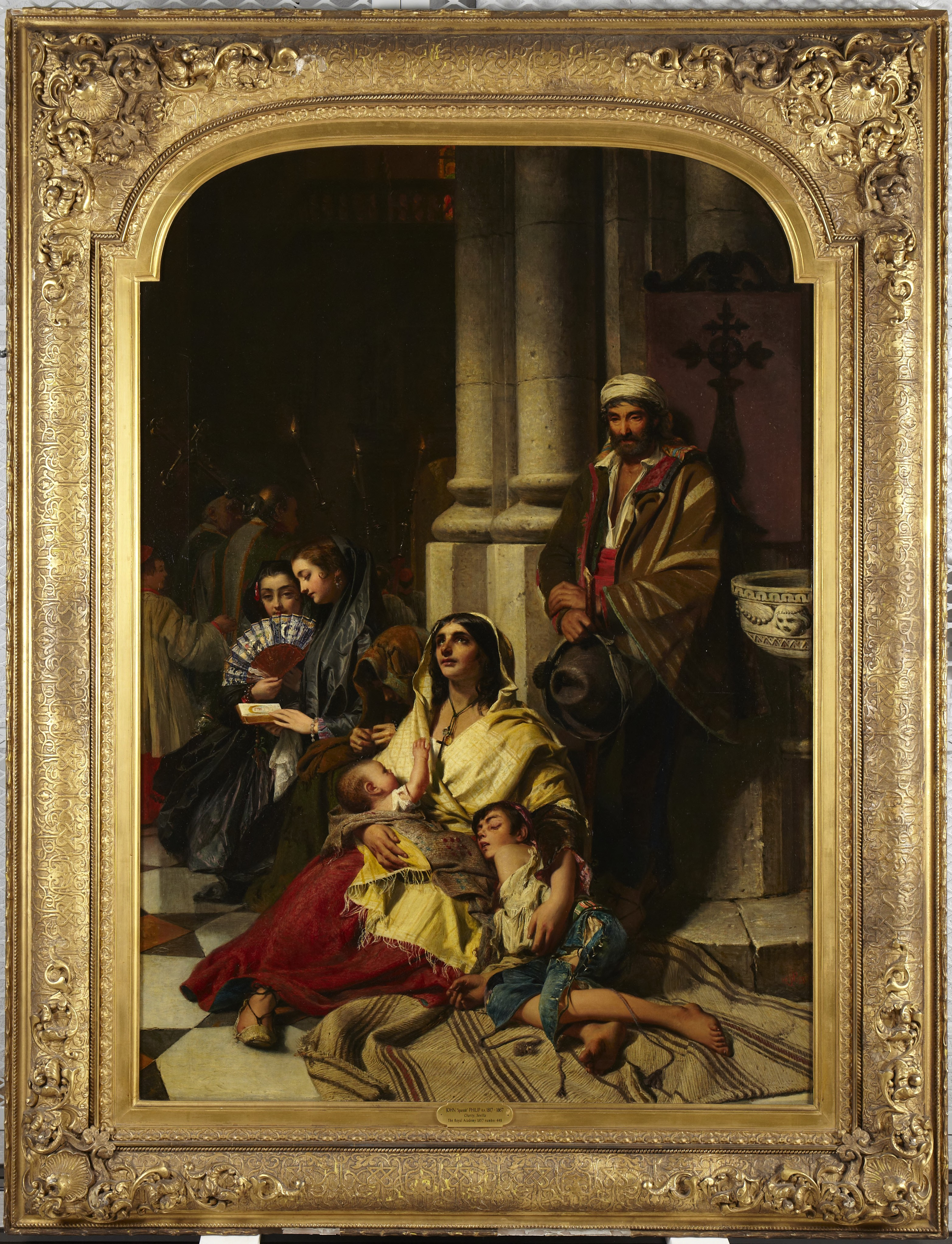
Charity by John Phillip

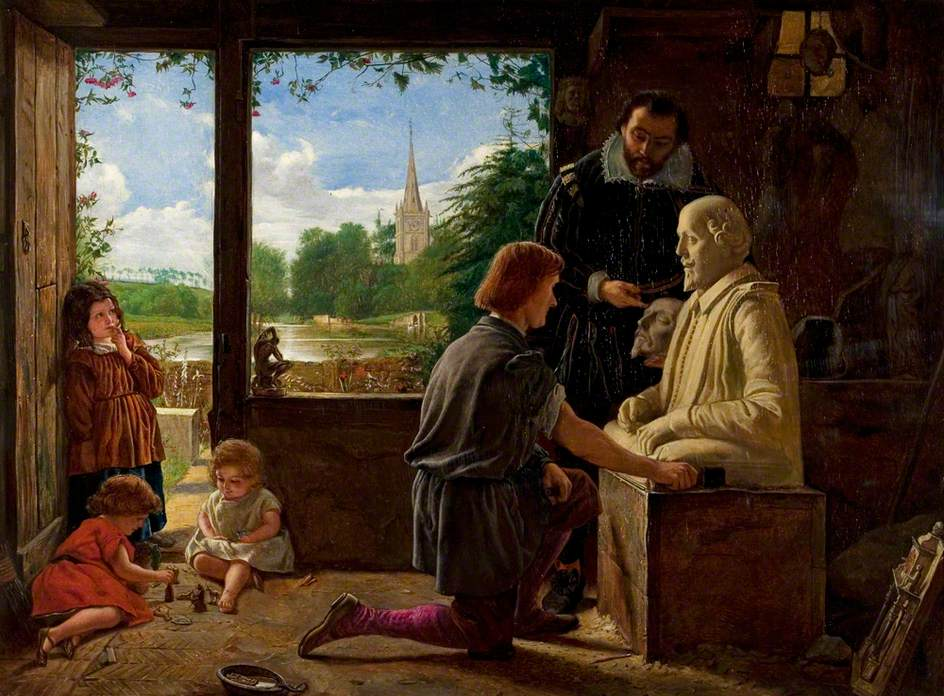
A Sculptor's Workshop, Stratford-upon-Avon, 1617 by Henry Wallis

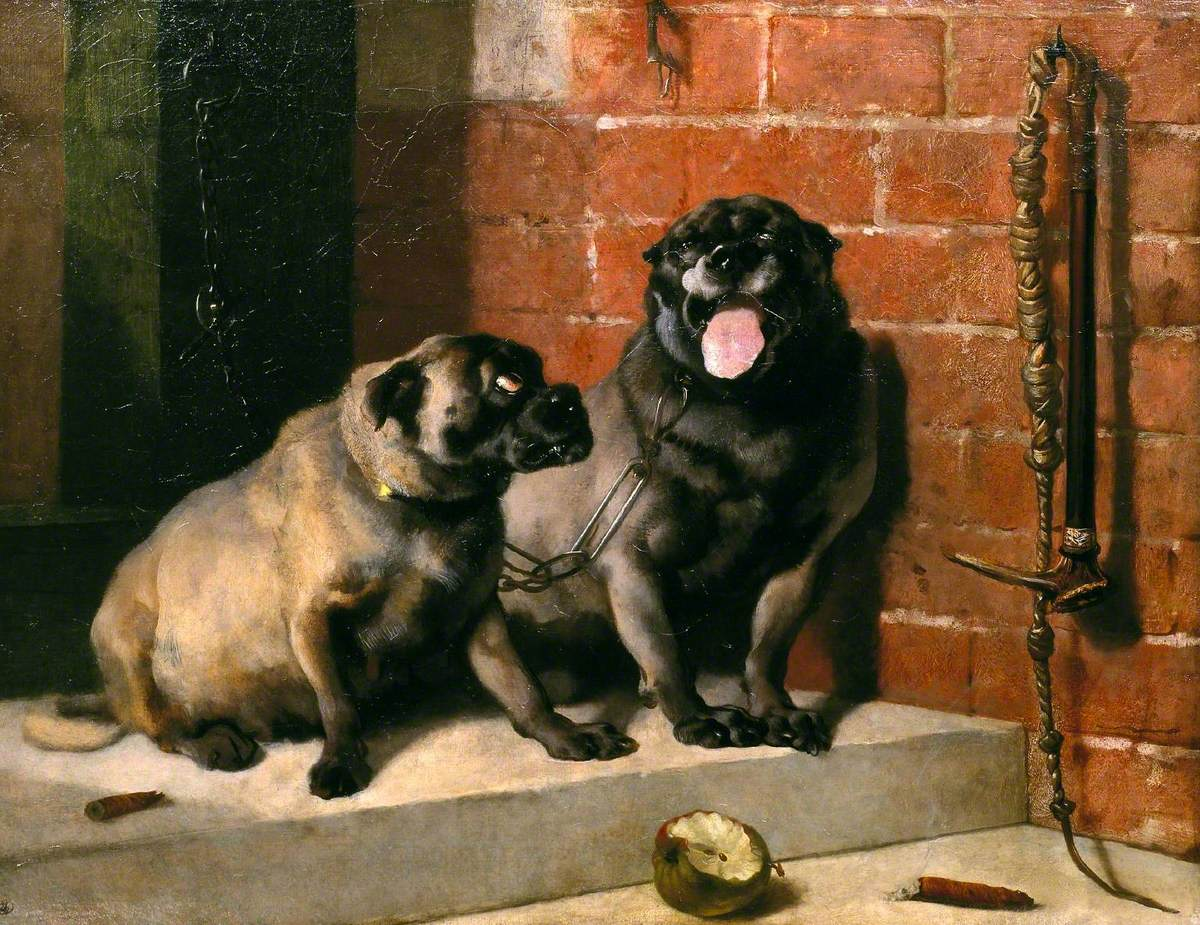
Uncle Tom by Edwin Landseer

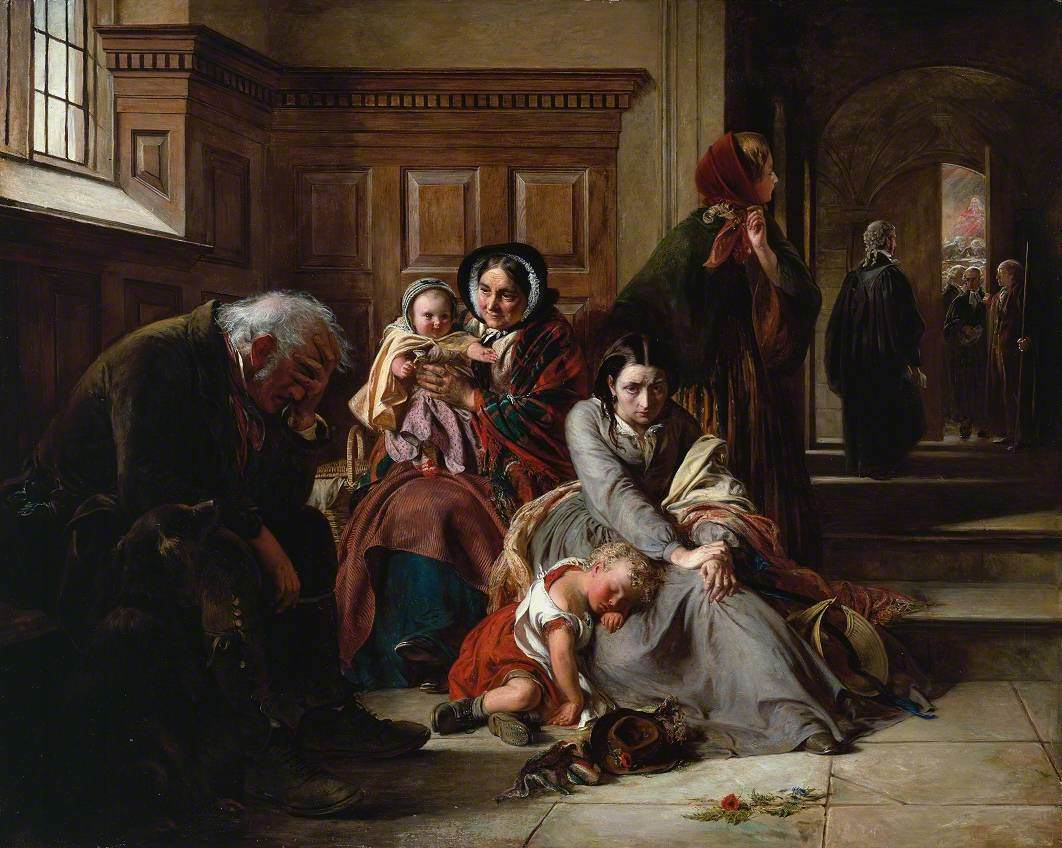
Waiting for the Verdict by Abraham Solomon

Morning After a Heavy Gale by Edward William Cooke

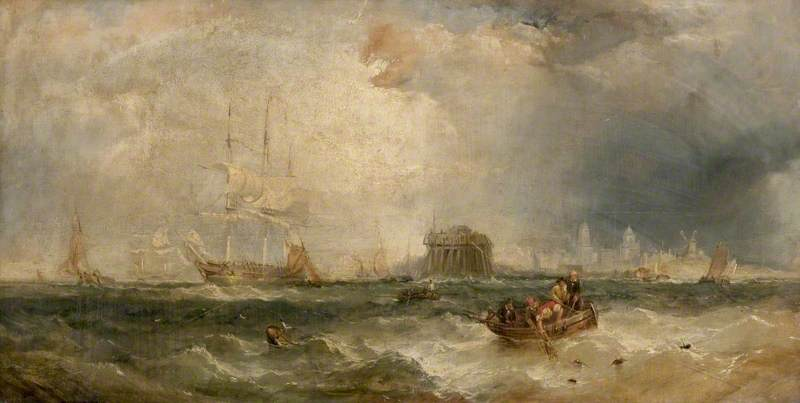
Calais Fishermen Taking In their Nets by Clarkson Stanfield

An Indian Summer Morning in the White Mountains by Jasper Francis Cropsey

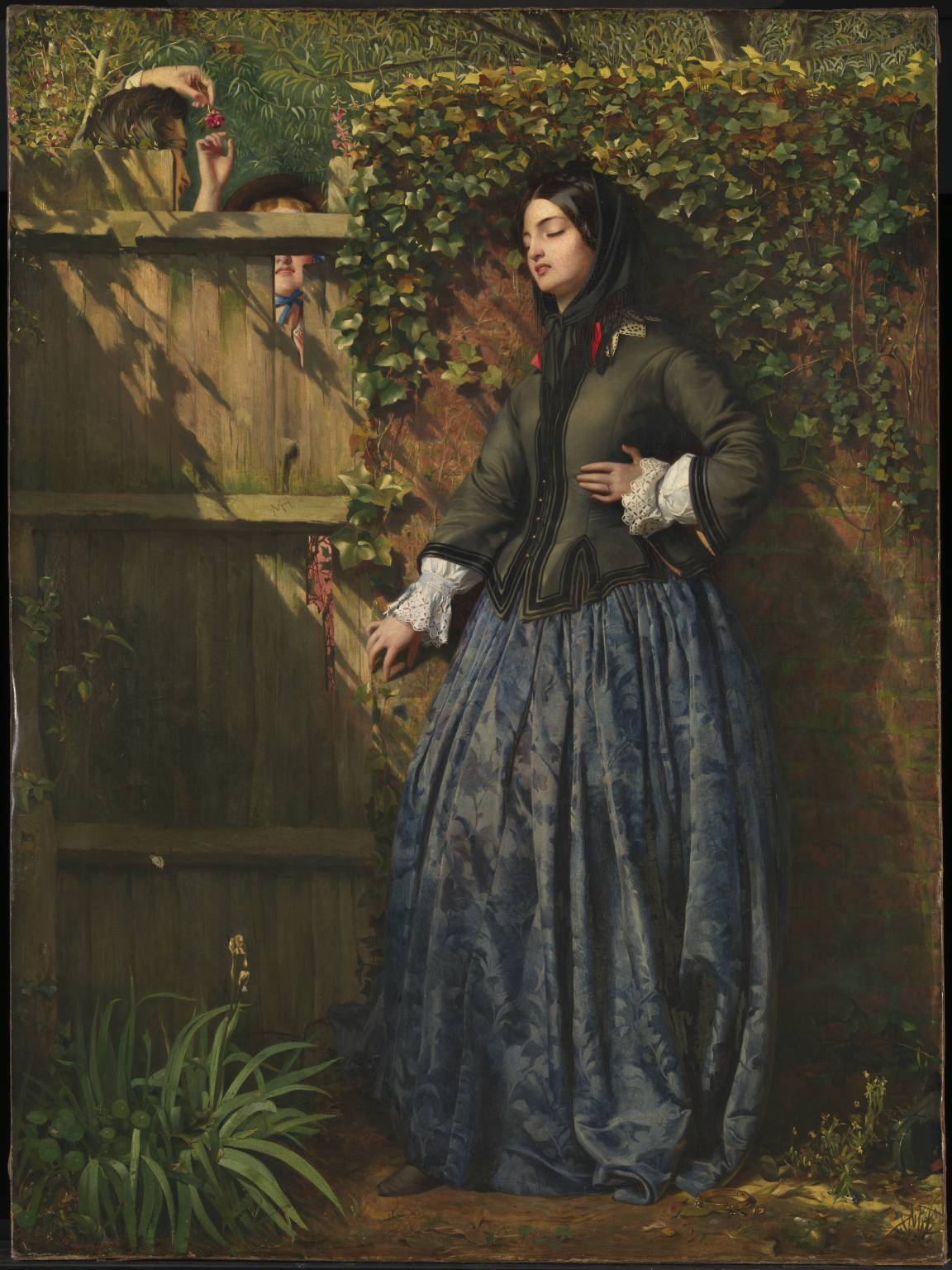
Broken Vows by Philip Hermogenes Calderon

A Picnic by Henry Nelson O'Neil

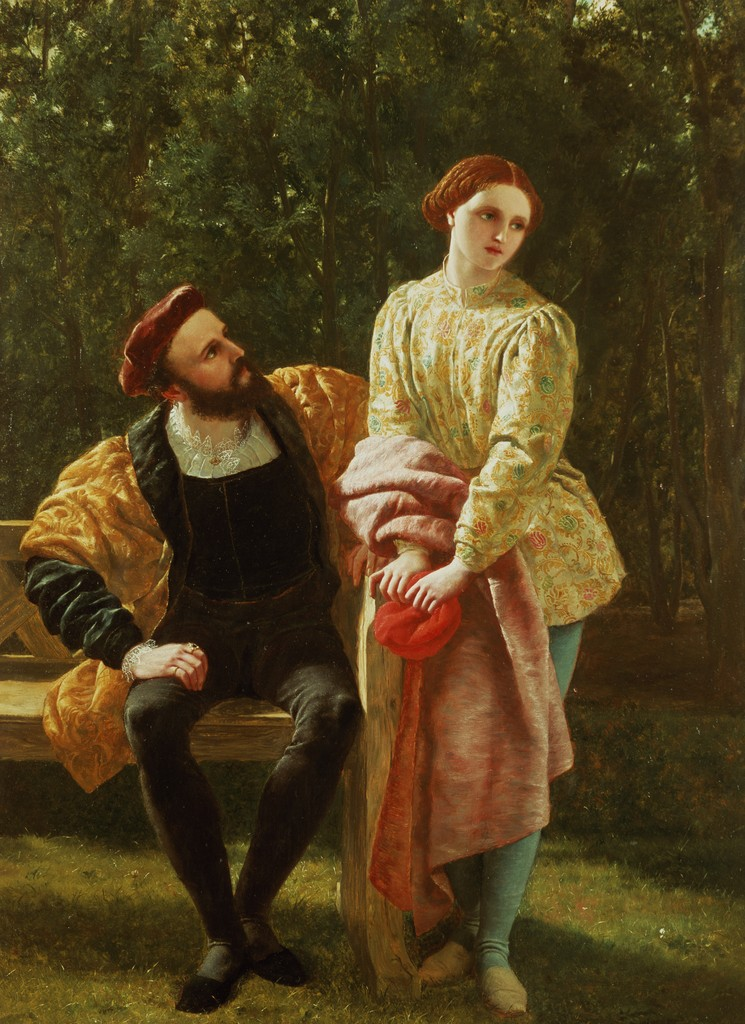
Orsino and Viola by Frederick Richard Pickersgill

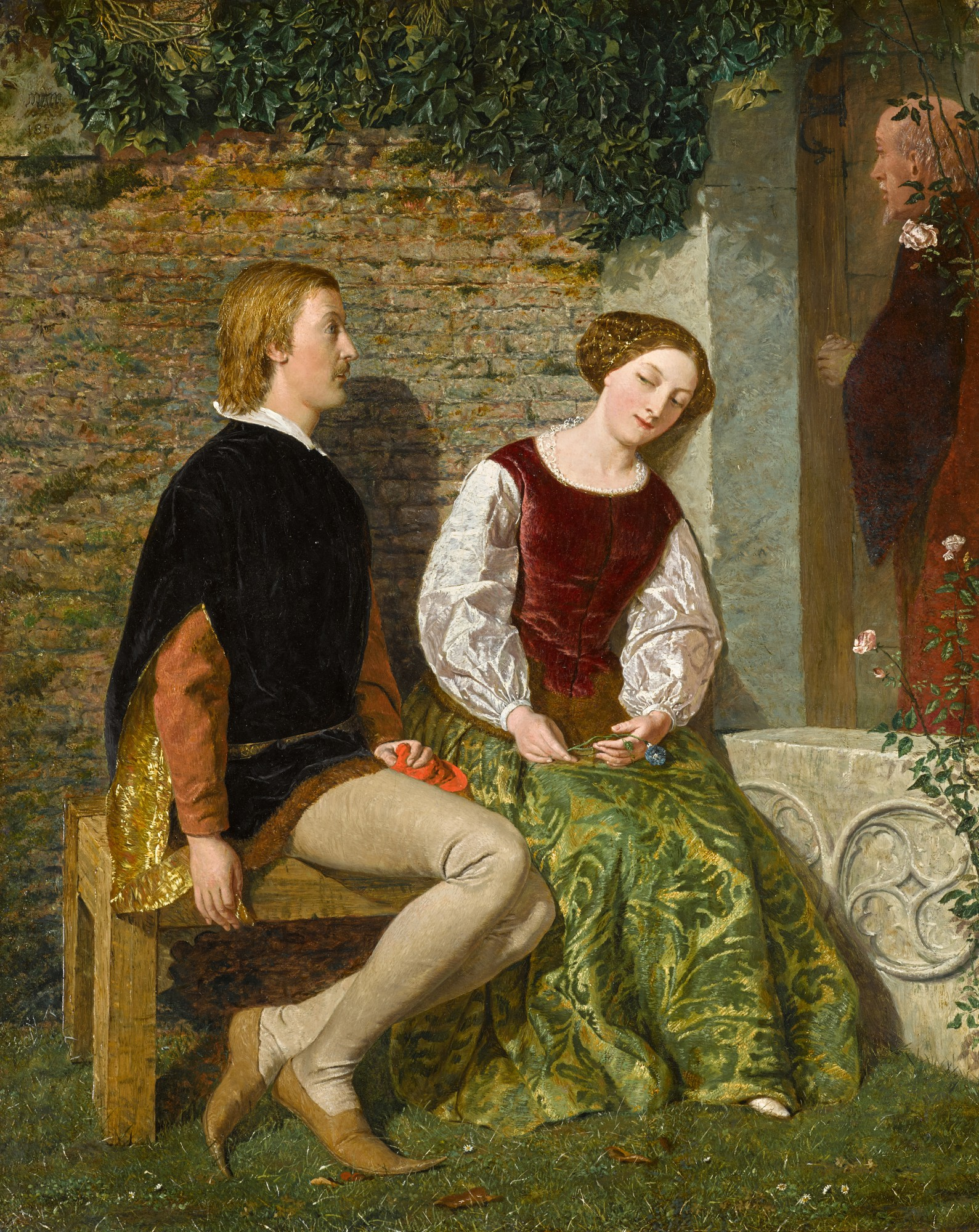
Slender's Wooing of Ann Page by Adolphus M. Madot

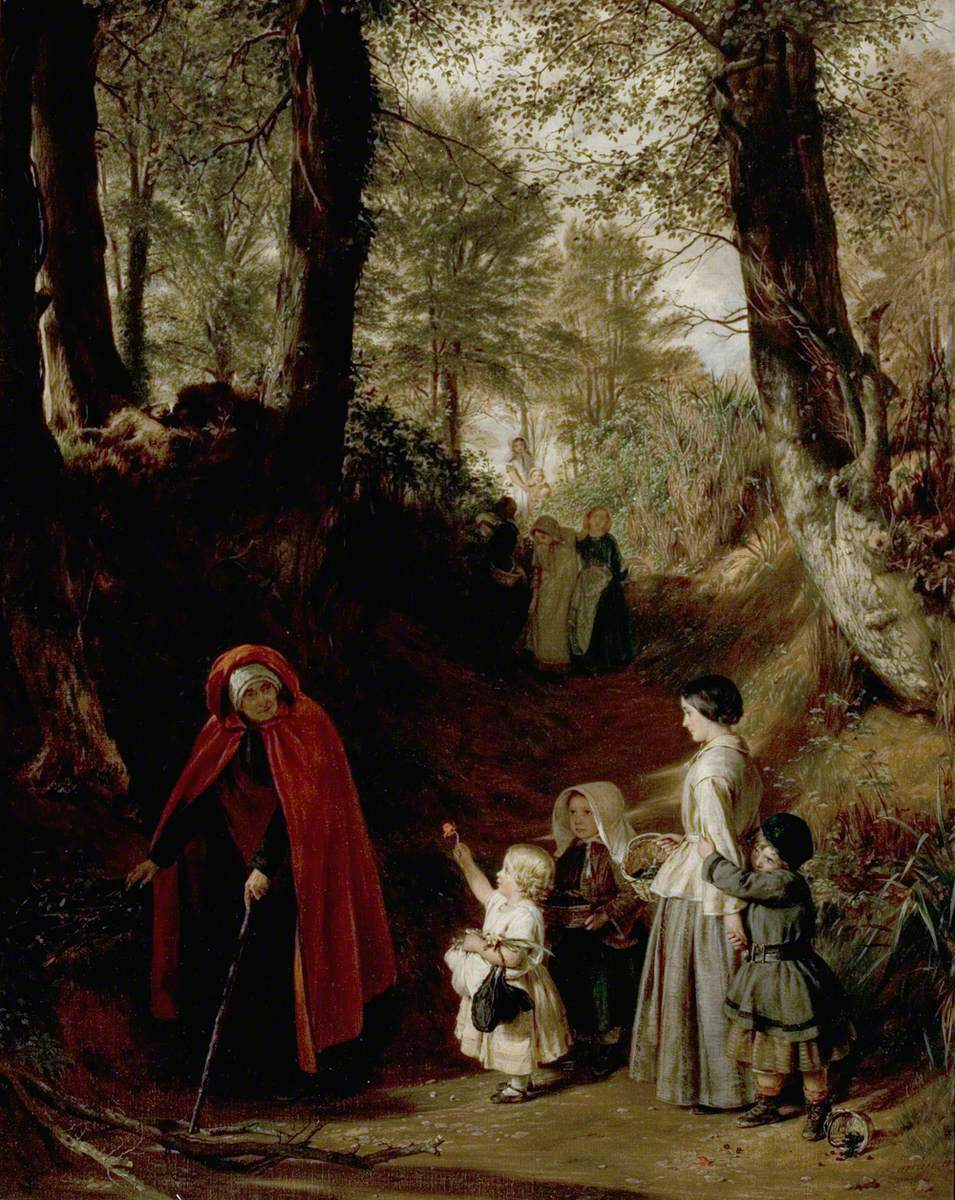
Youth and Age by John Callcott Horsley

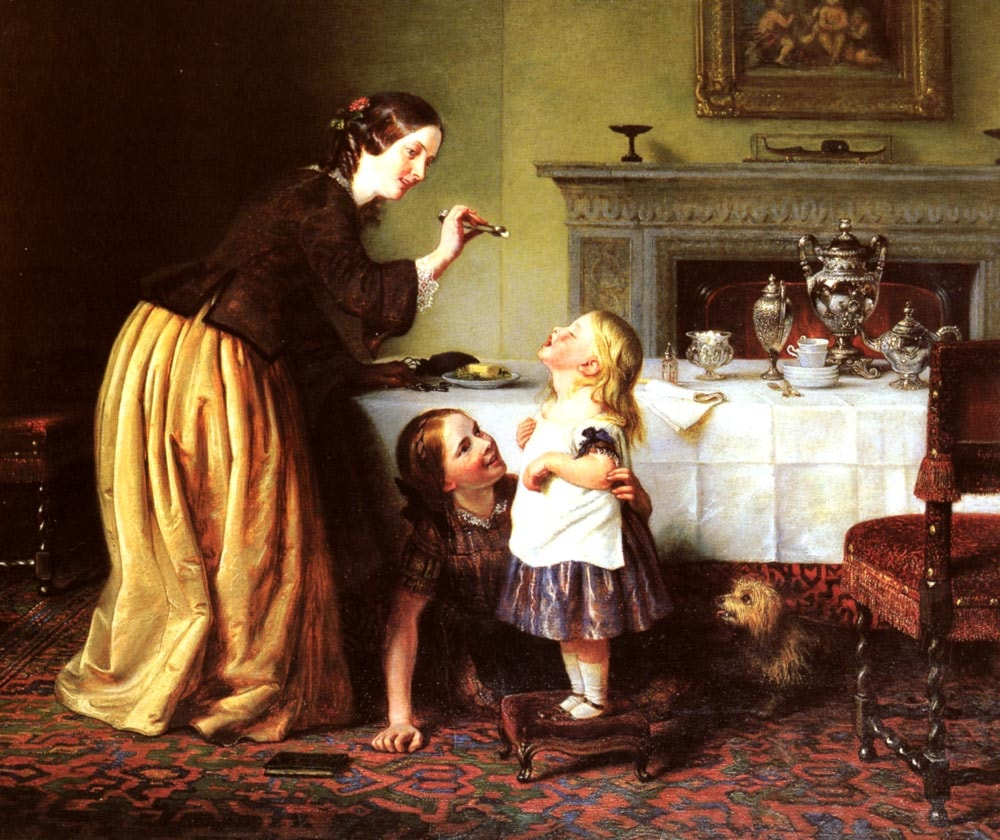
Breakfast Time, Morning Games by Charles West Cope

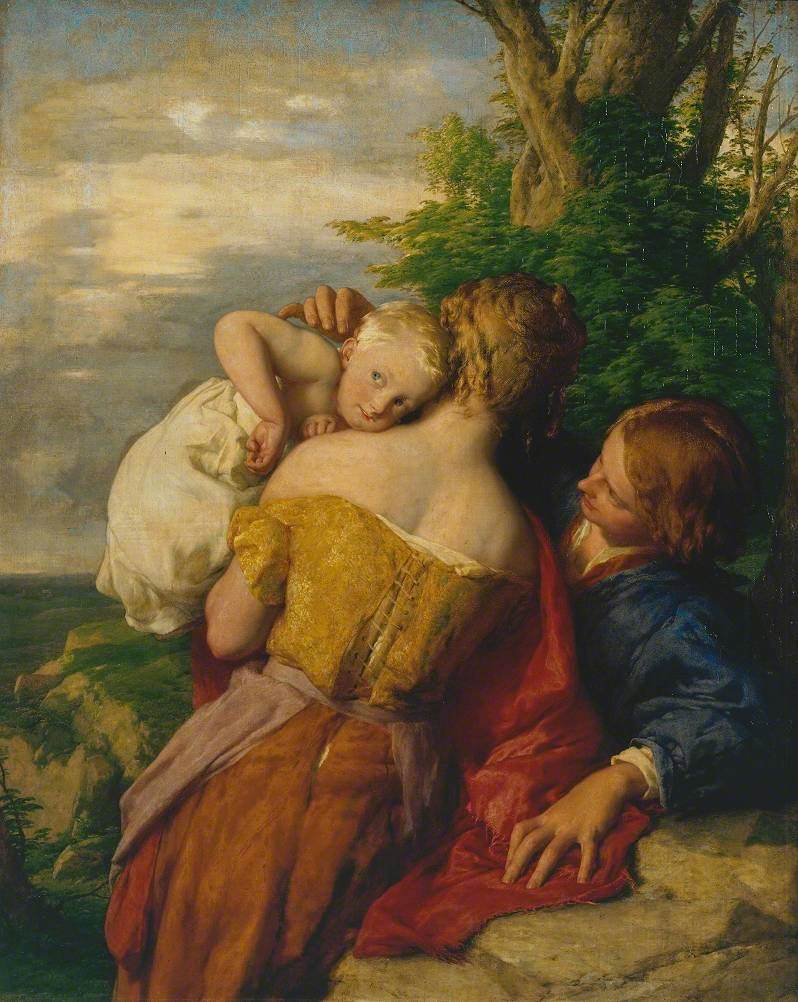
The Young Brother by William Mulready

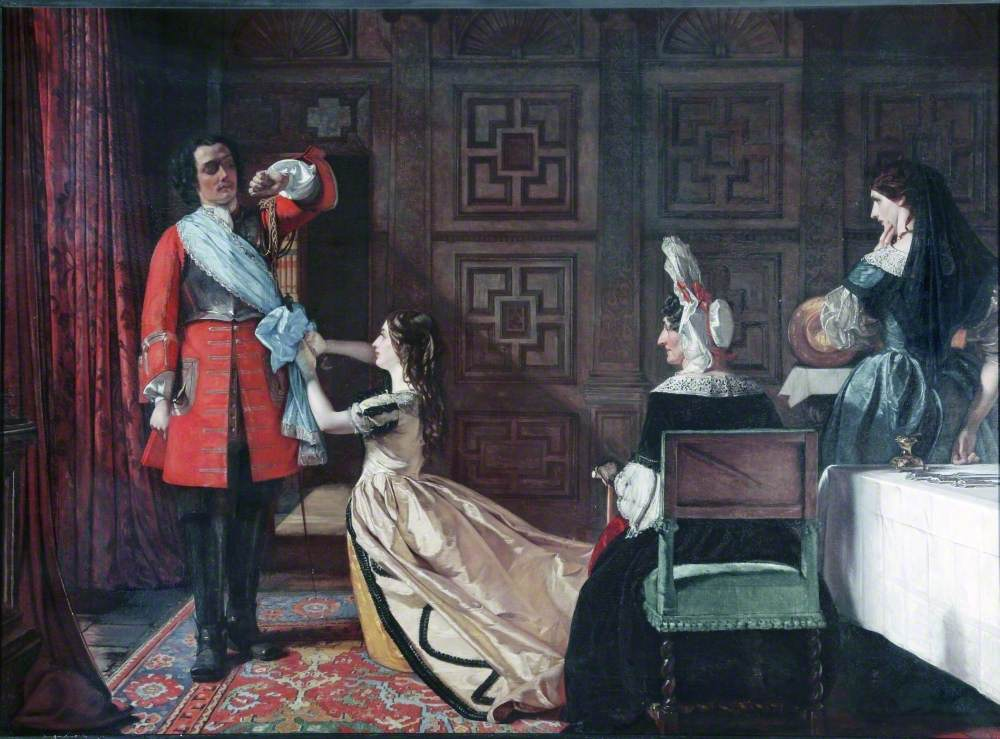
Esmond Returns after the Battle of Wynendael by Augustus Egg

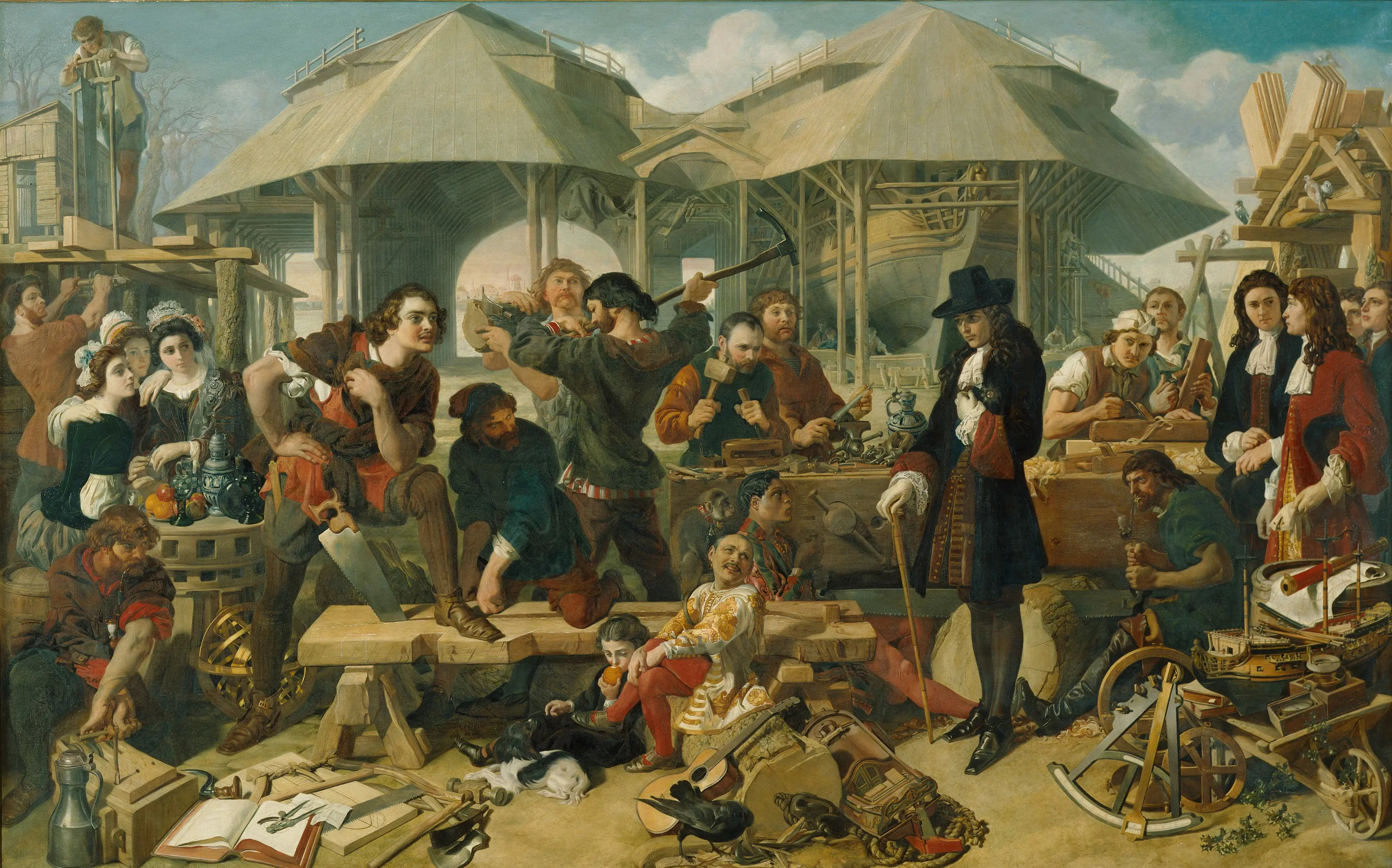
Peter the Great at Deptford Dockyard by Daniel Maclise

Mules Drinking, Seville by Richard Ansdell

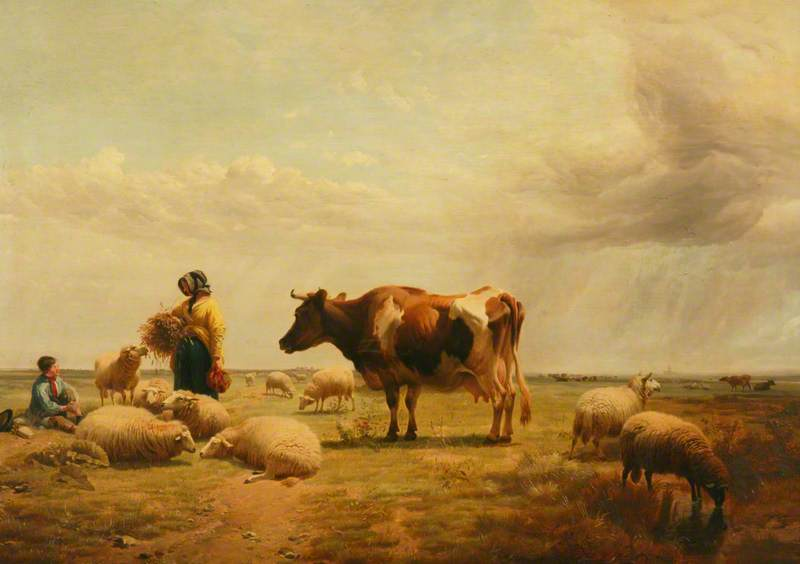
Heat Showers in August by Thomas Sidney Cooper

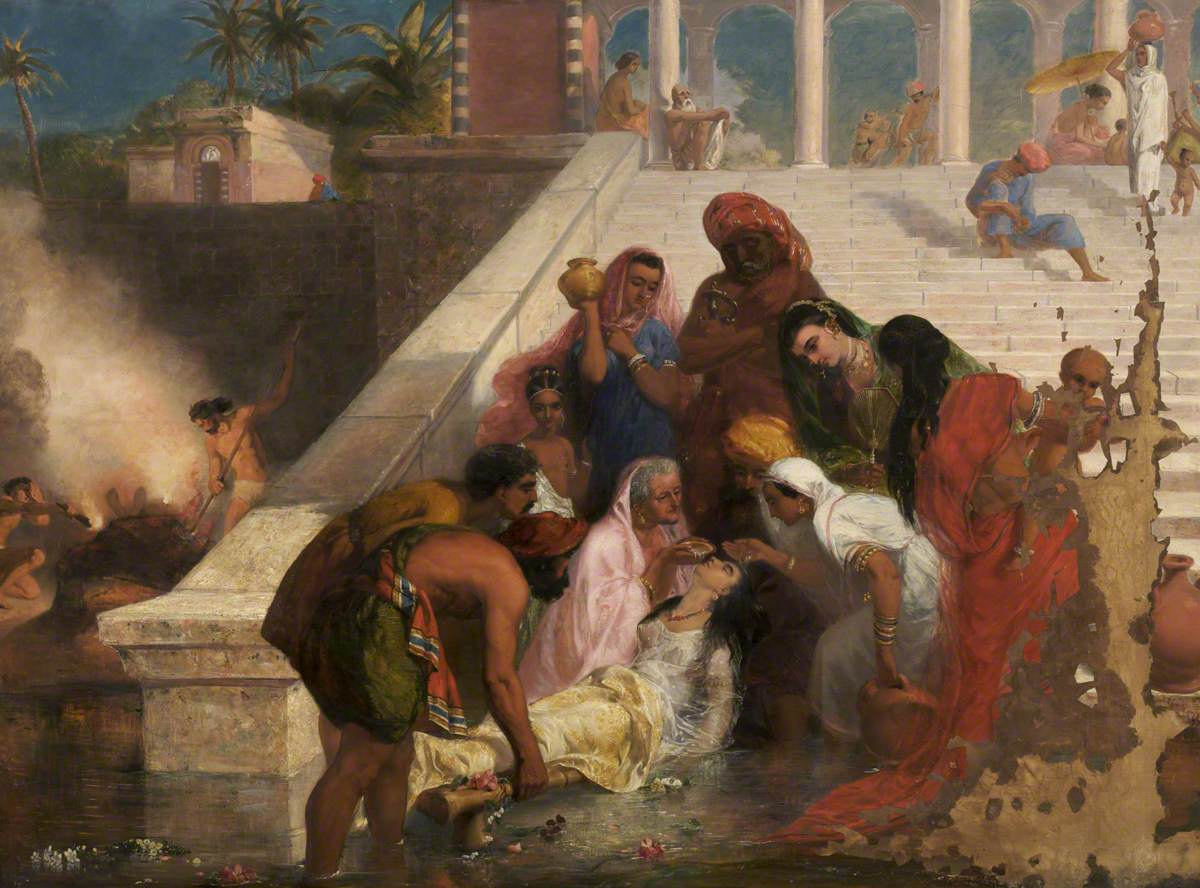
Scene at a Ghaut on the Banks of the Ganges by Marshall Claxton

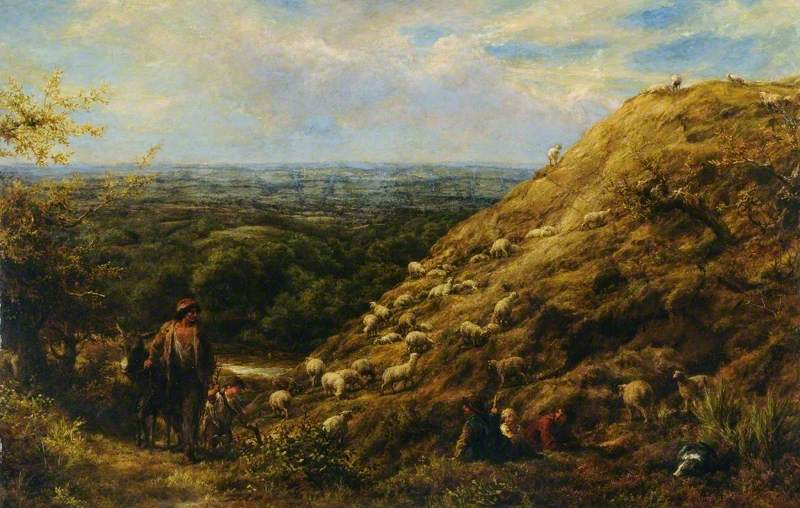
Where the Nibbling Flocks do Stray by William Linnell

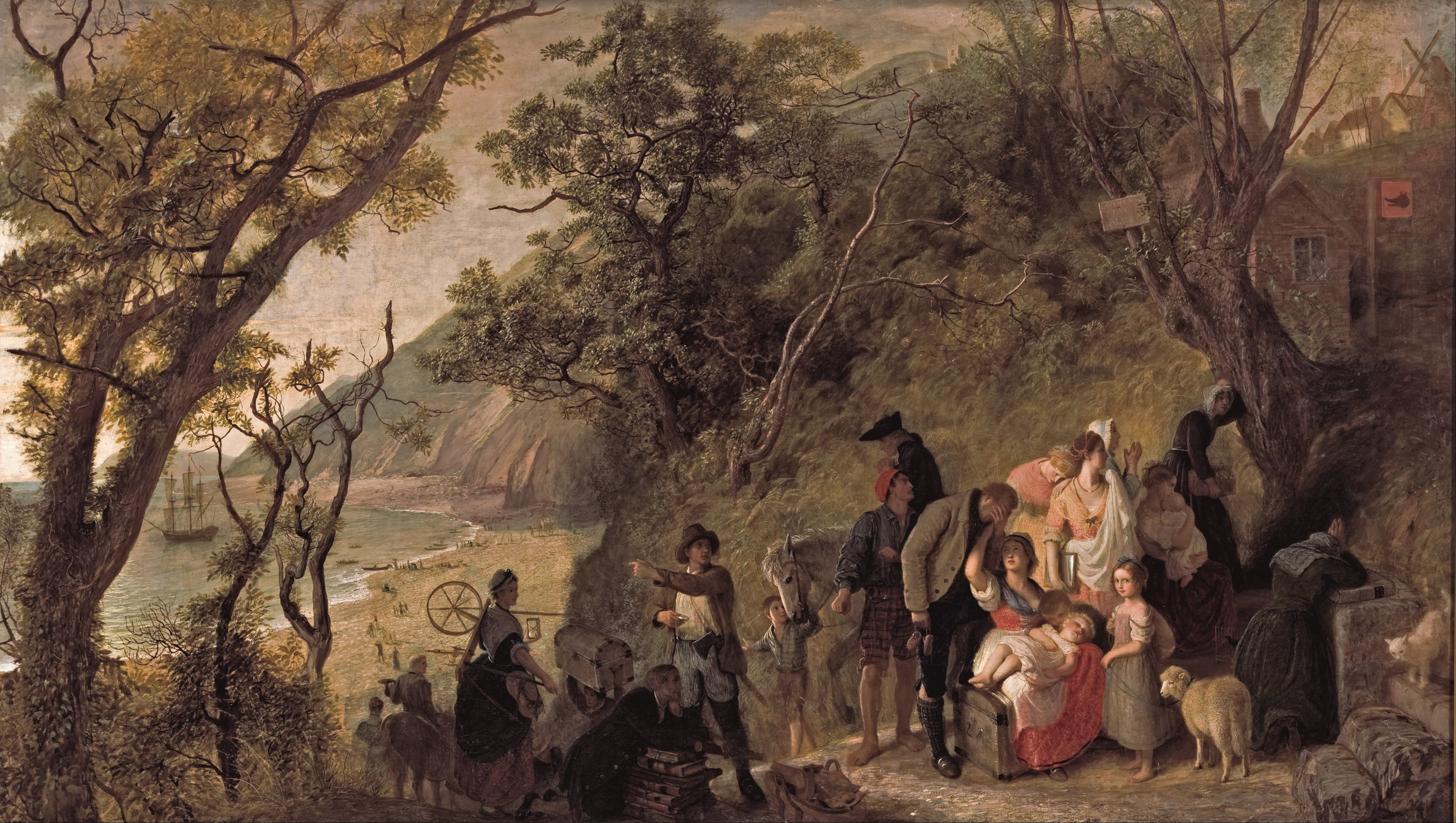
The Deserted Village by Joseph Severn

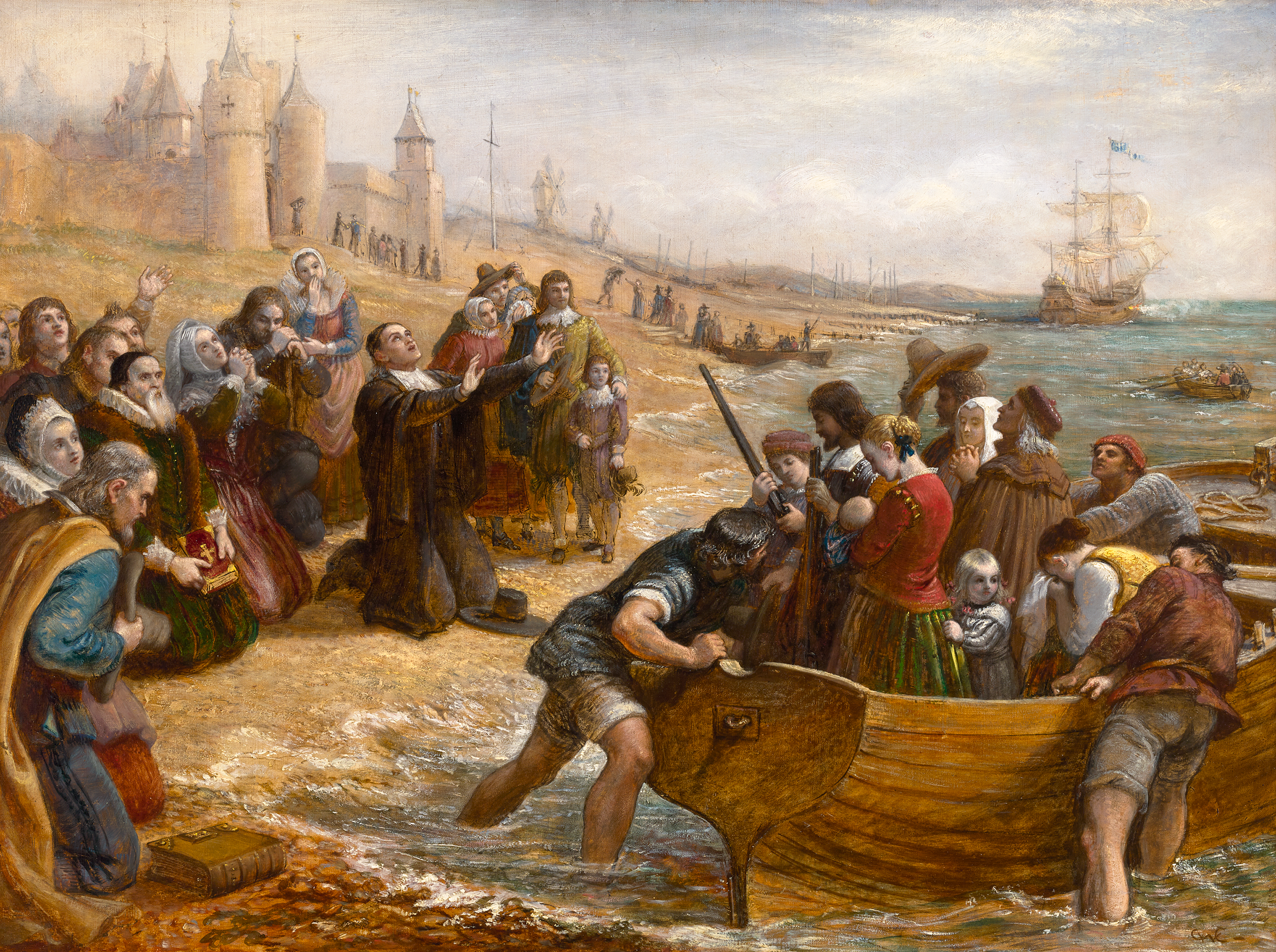
The Pilgrim Fathers by Charles West Cope

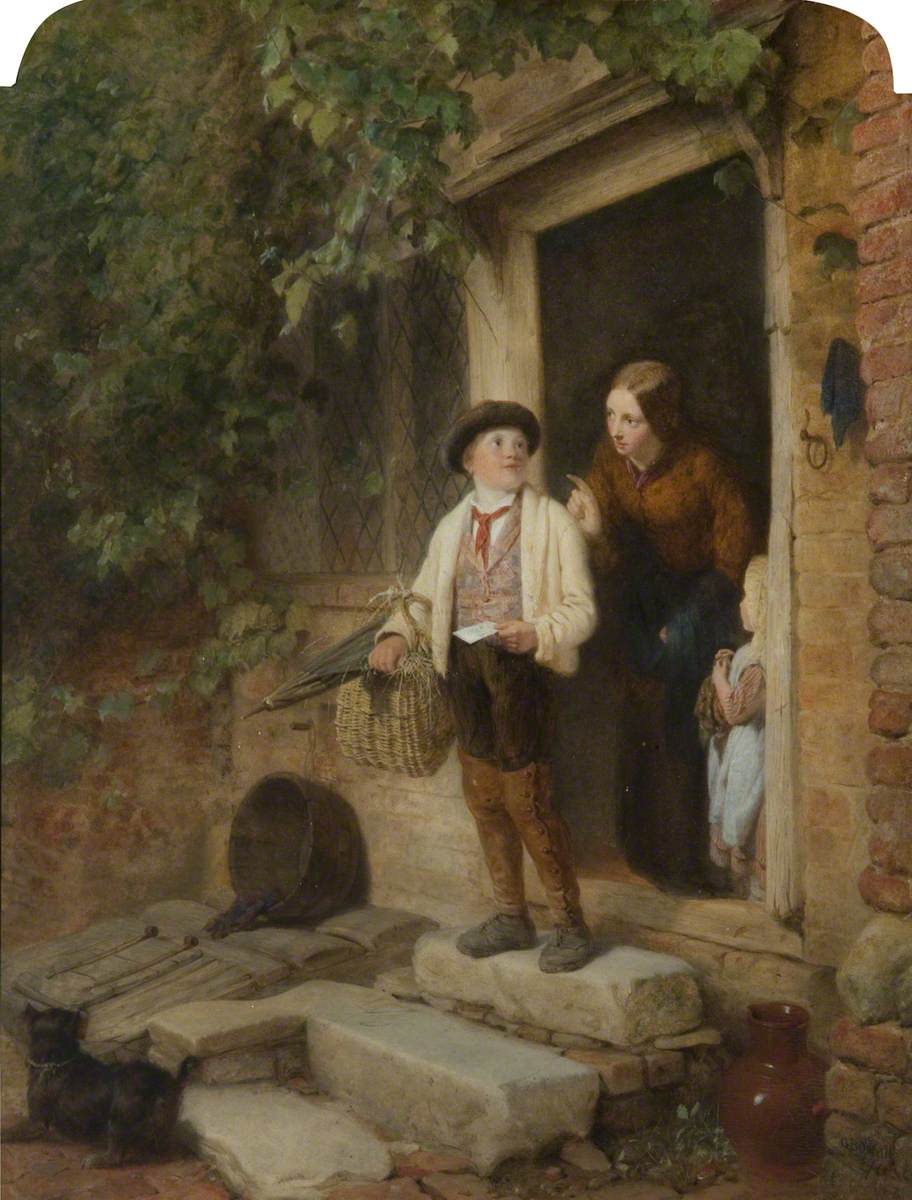
The Message by George Bernard O'Neill

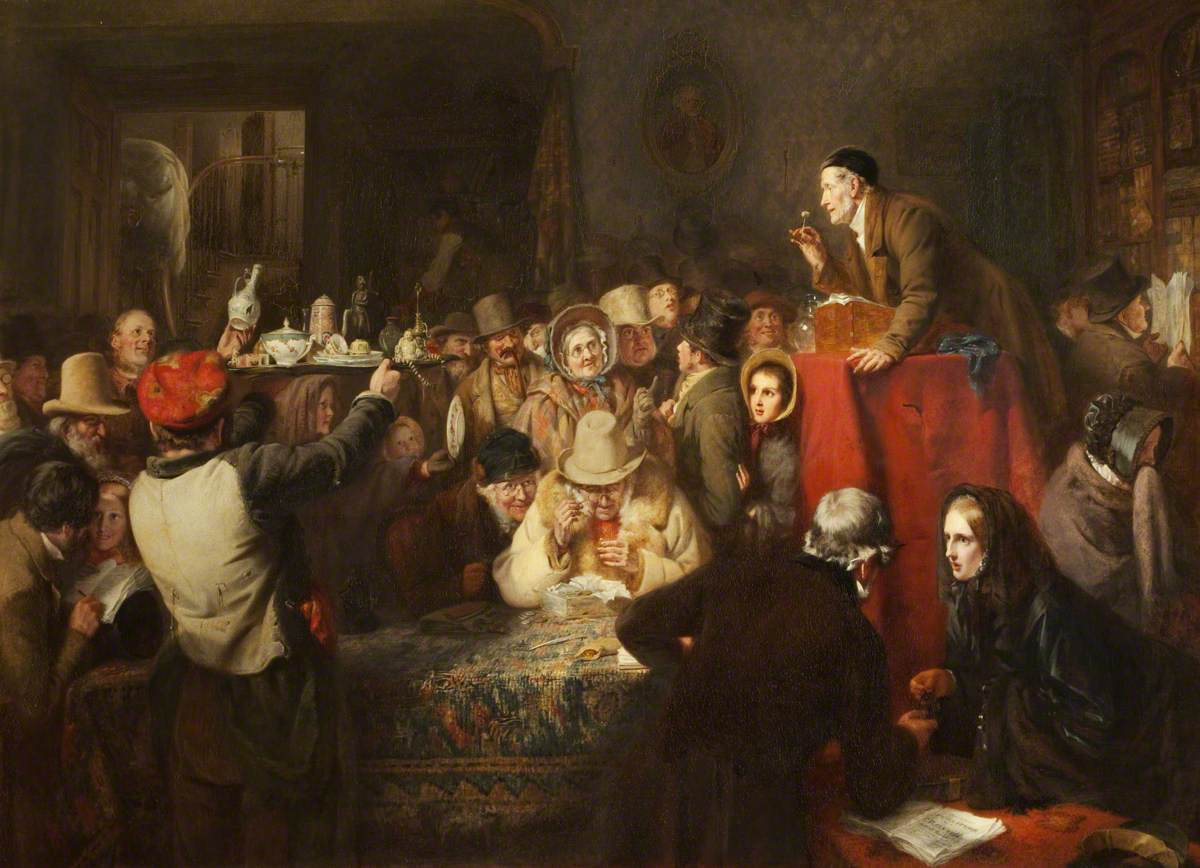
The Last Day of the Sale by George Bernard O'Neill

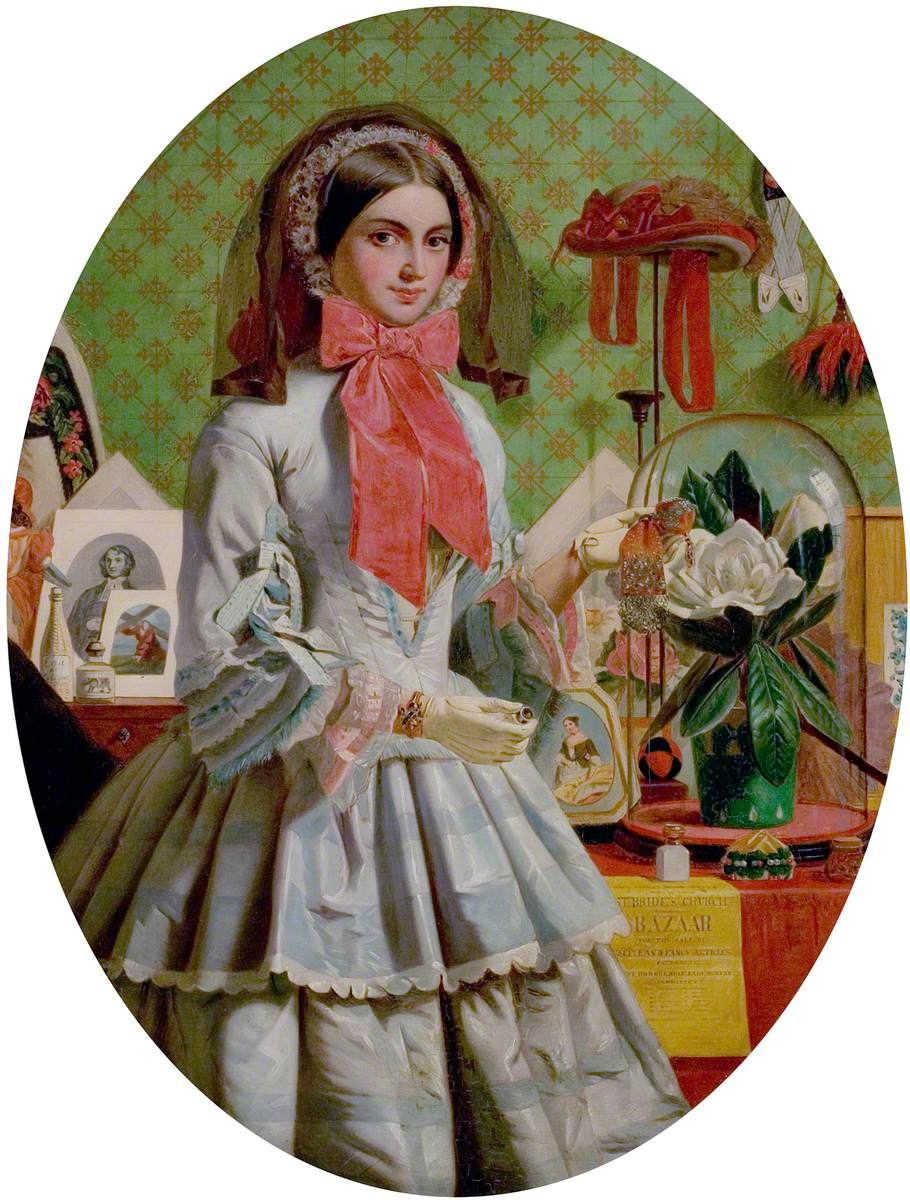
For Sale by James Collinson

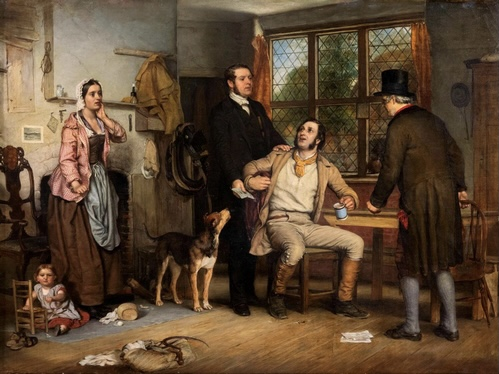
The Arrest by John Evan Hodgson

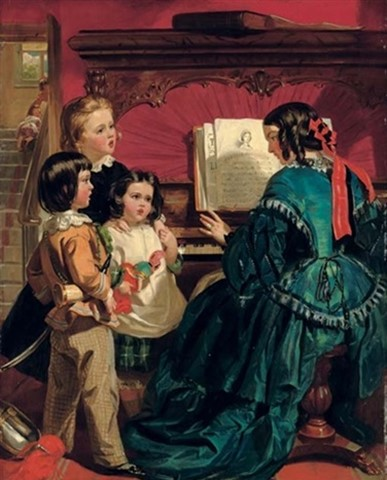
God Save the Queen by Henrietta Ward

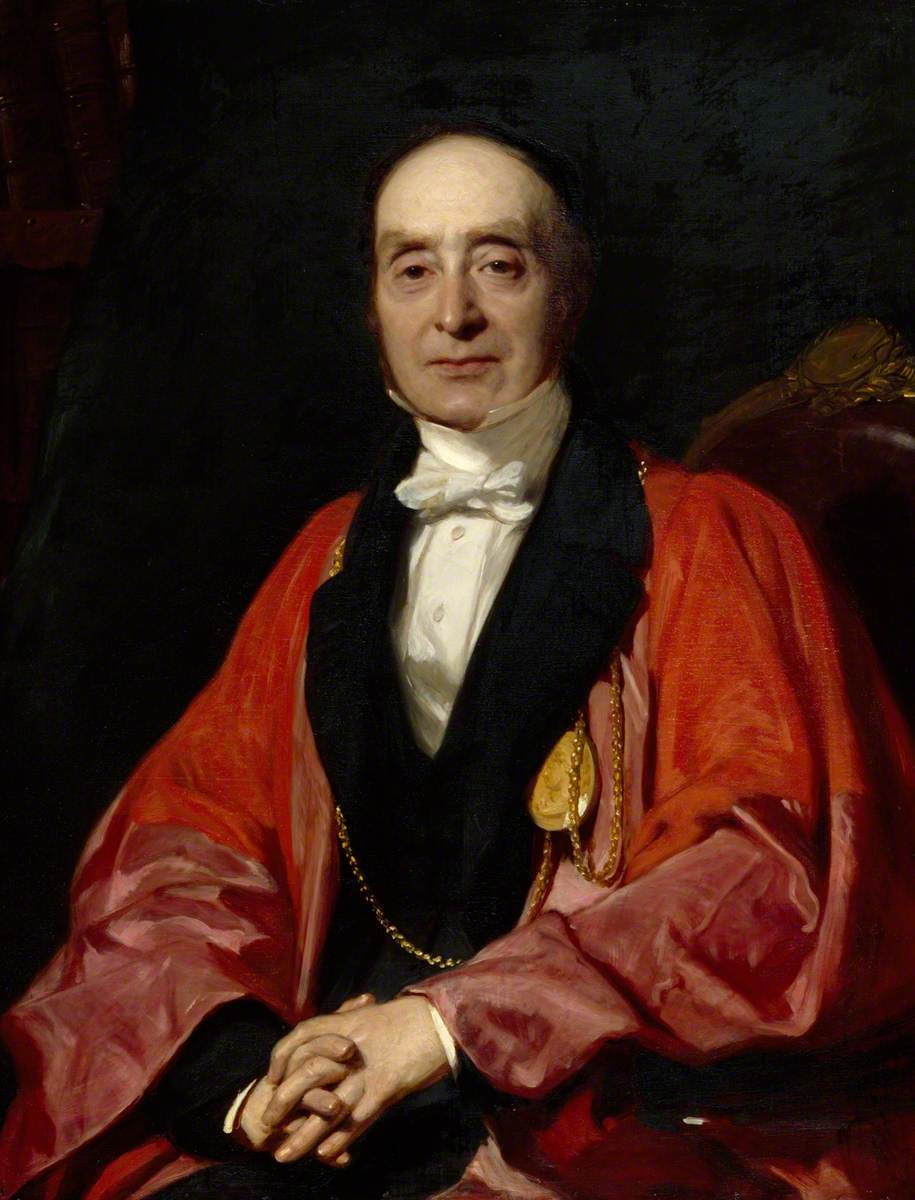
Charles Lock Eastlake by John Prescott Knight

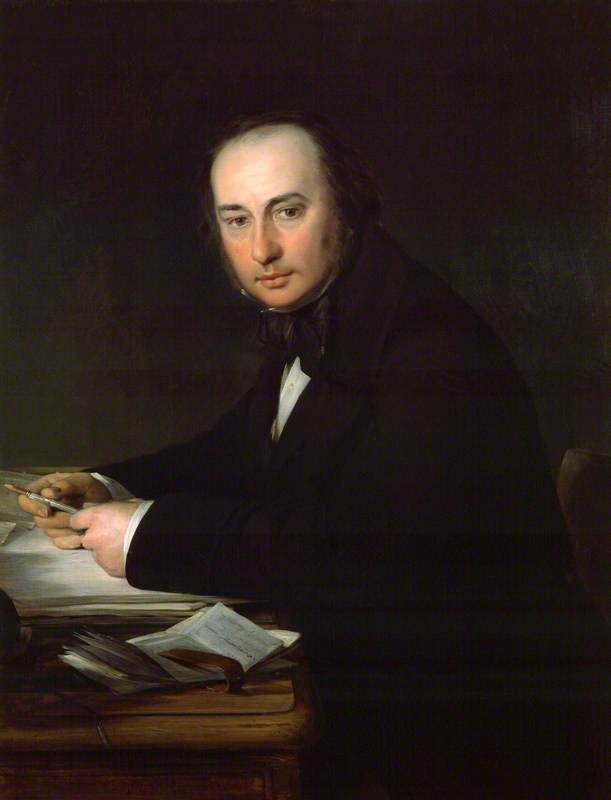
Isambard Kingdom Brunel by John Callcott Horsley

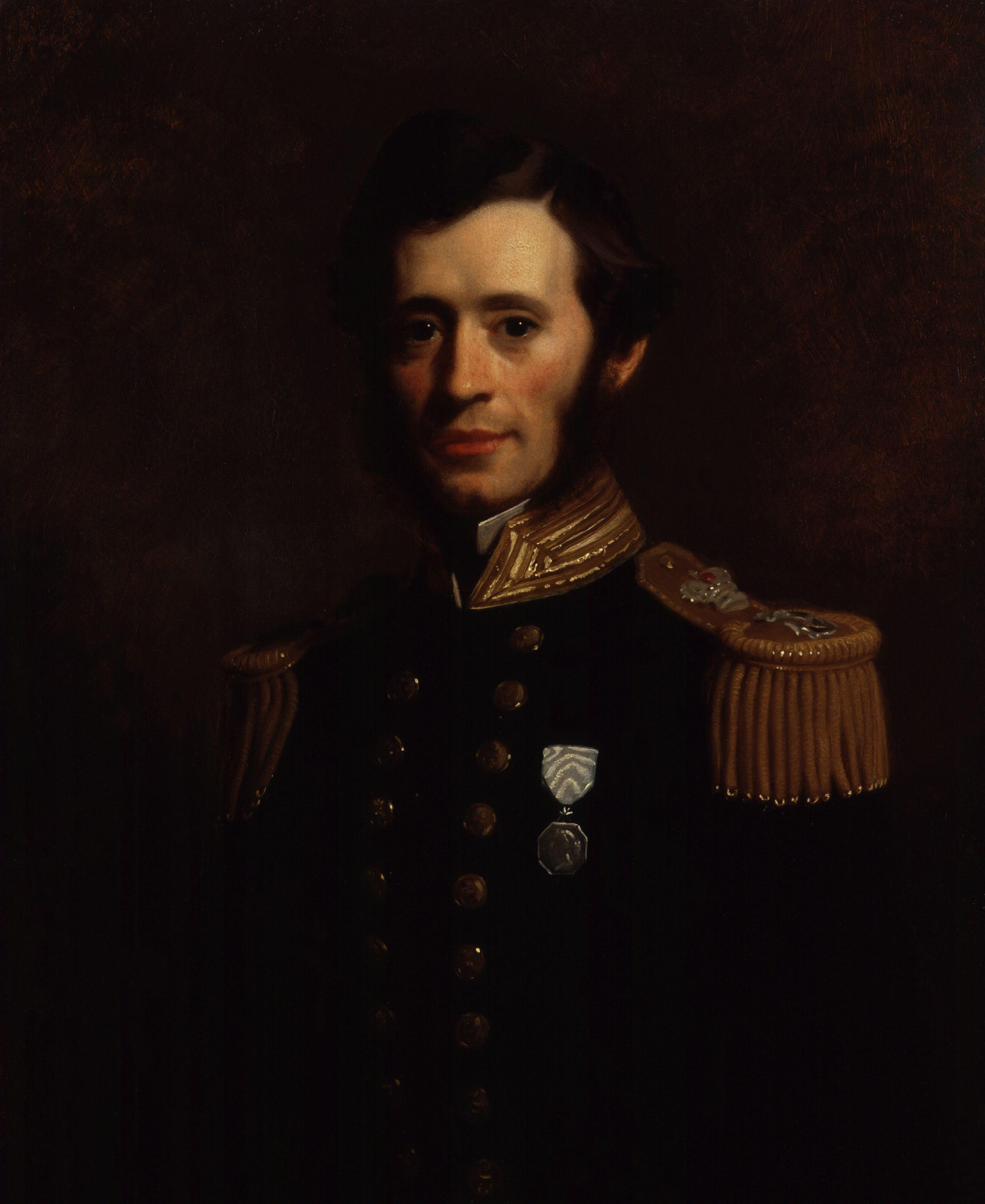
Leopold McClintock by Stephen Pearce

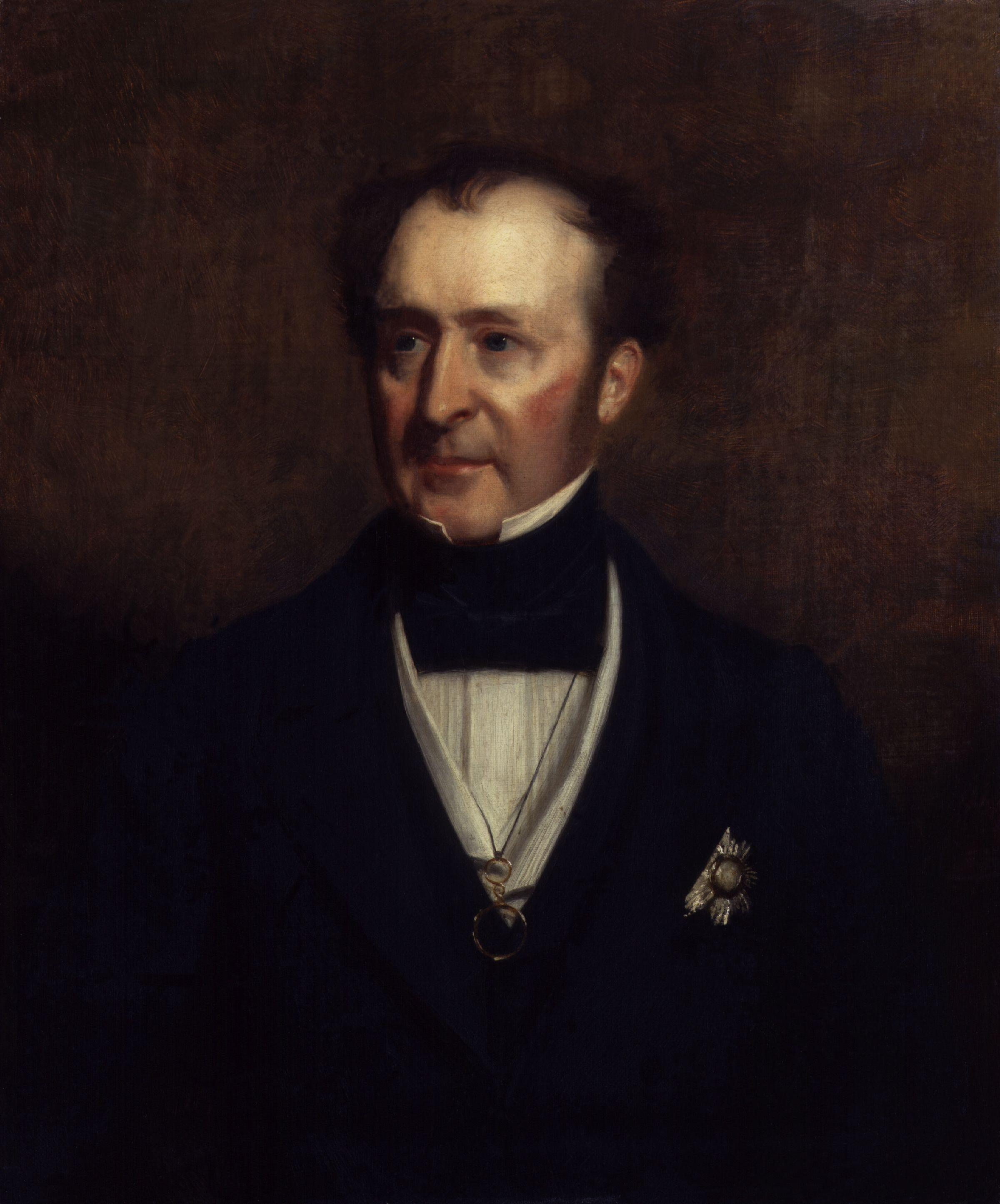
Roderick Murchison by Stephen Pearce

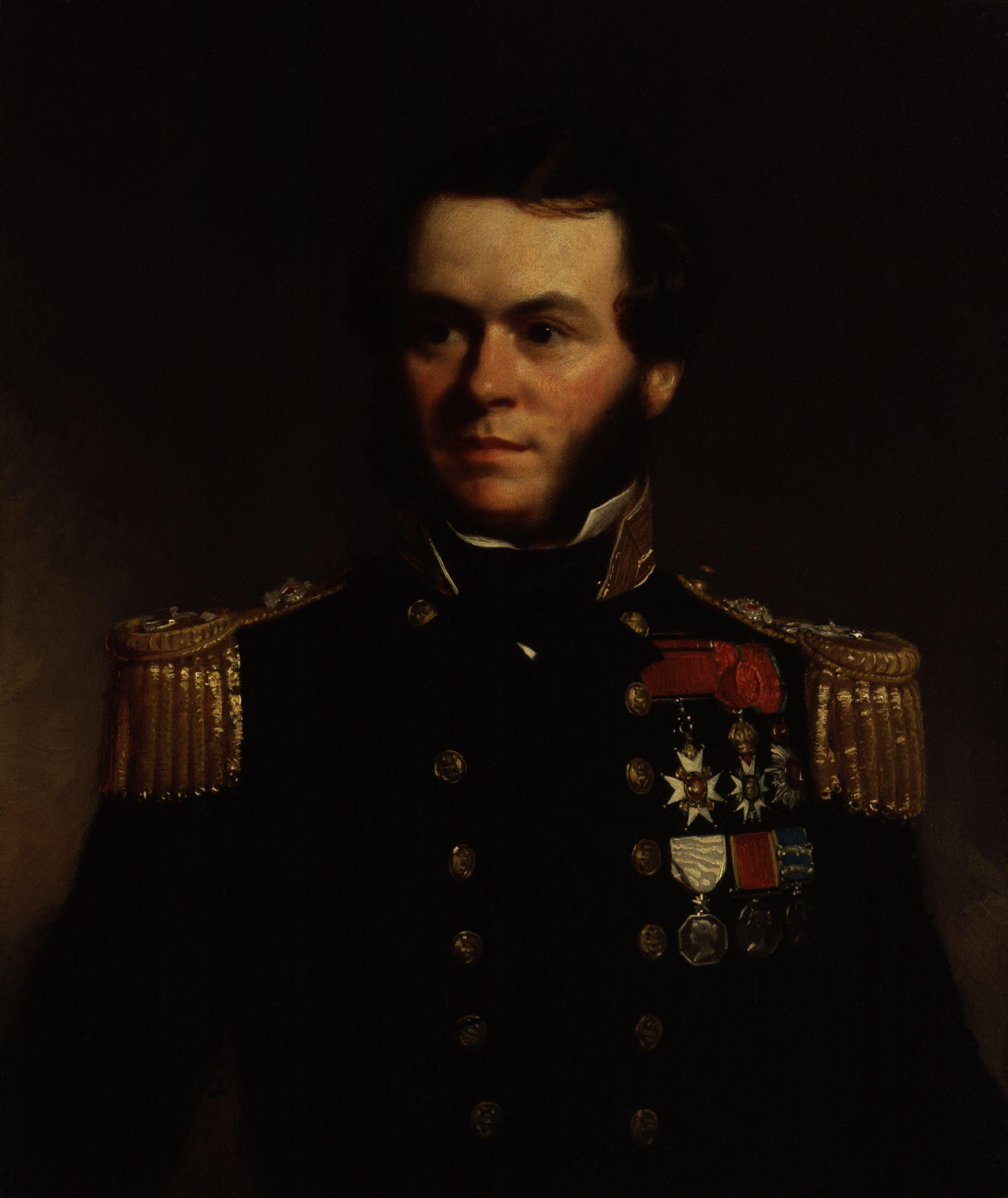
Sherard Osborn by Stephen Pearce

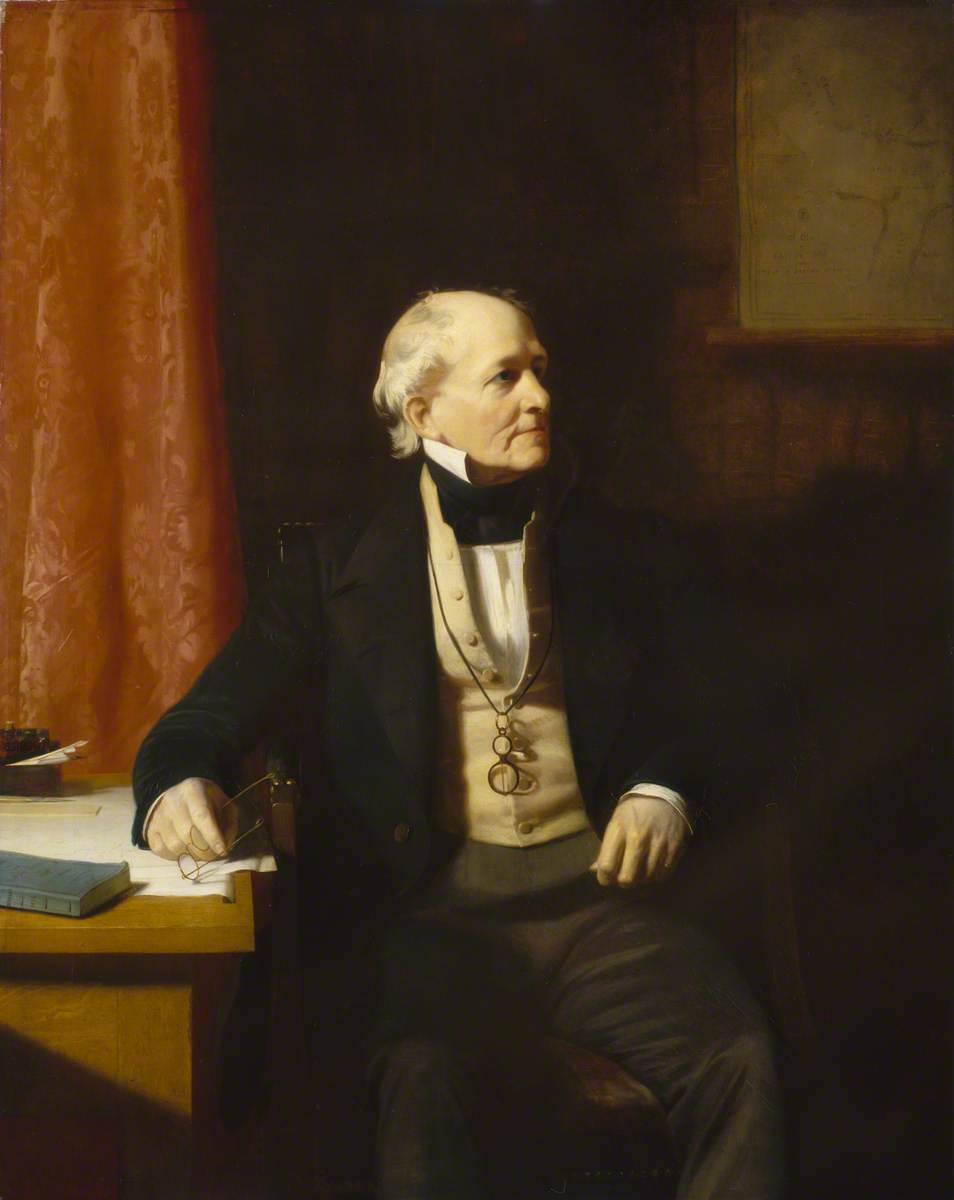
Francis Beaufort by Stephen Pearce

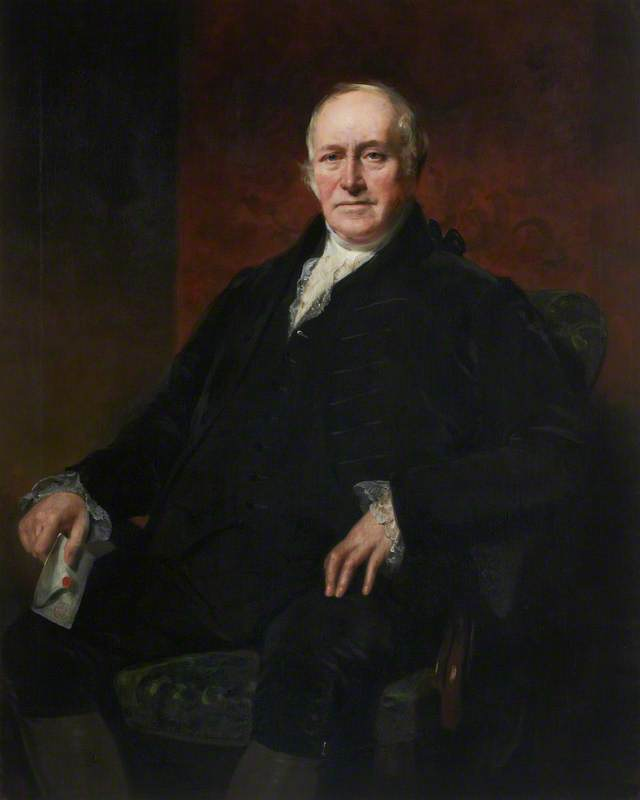
Lord Murray by John Watson Gordon

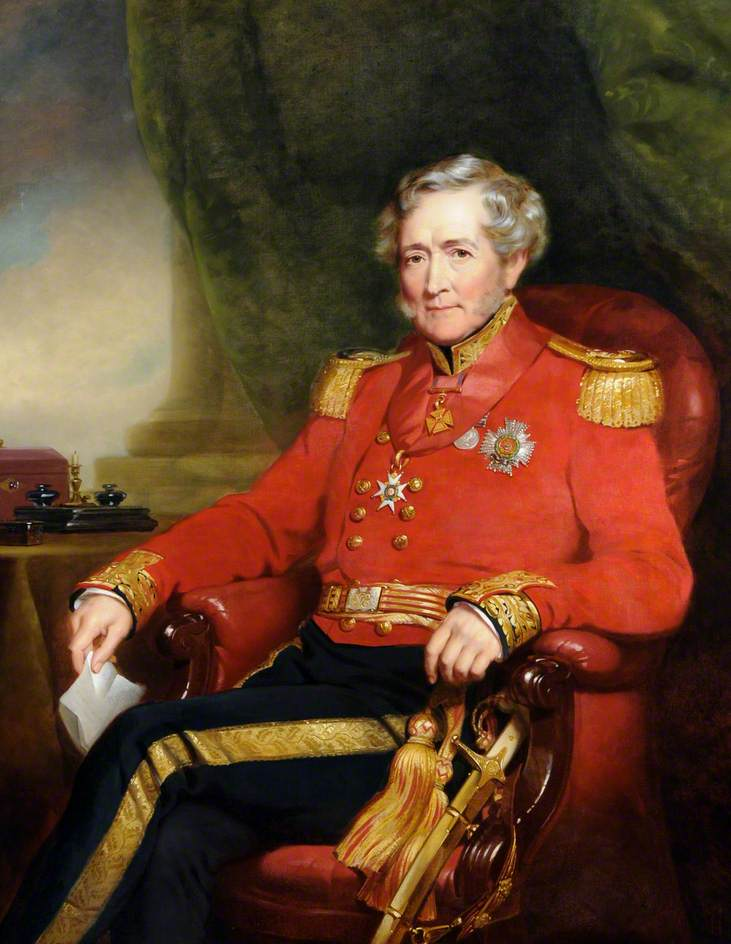
John Bell by John Lucas

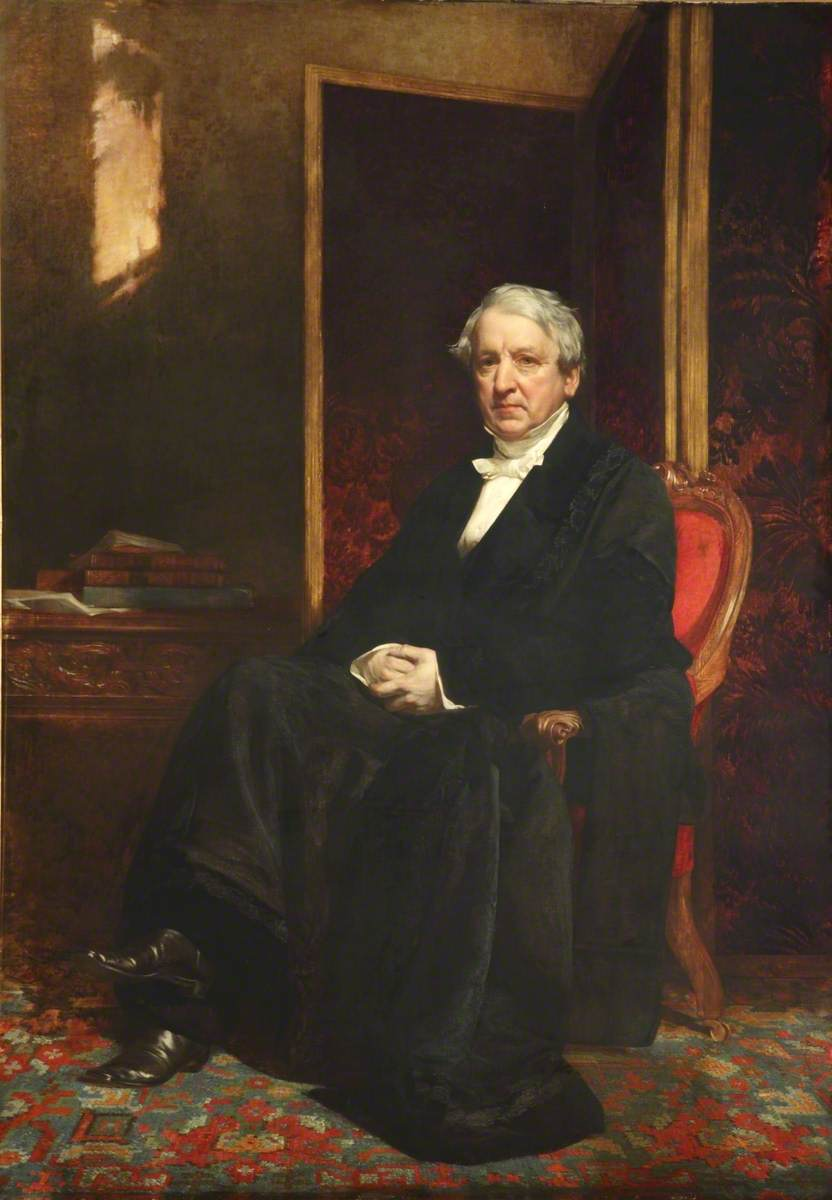
John Stewart, Mayor of Liverpool by John Ewart Robertson

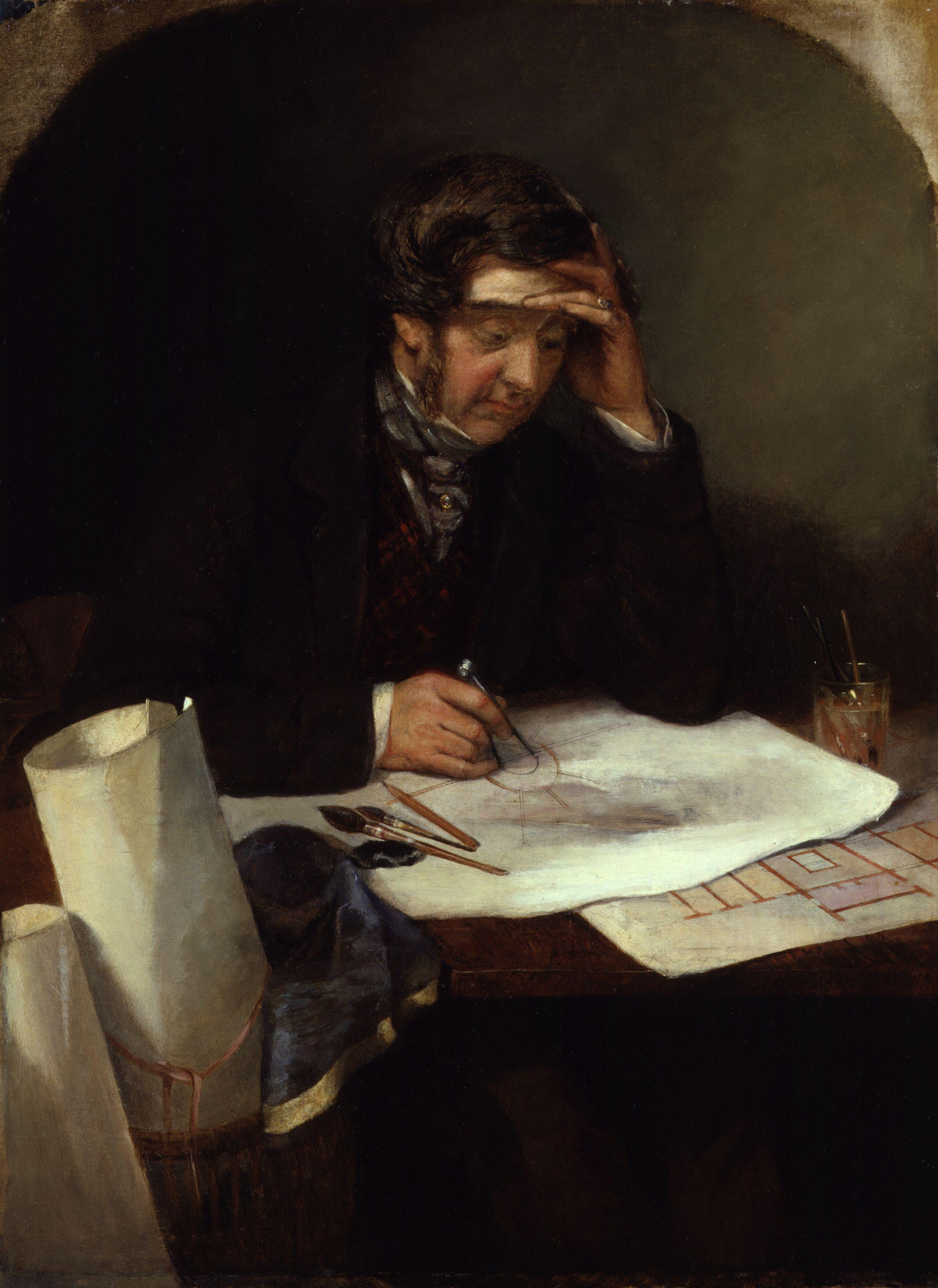
Thomas Henry Wyatt by George Landseer

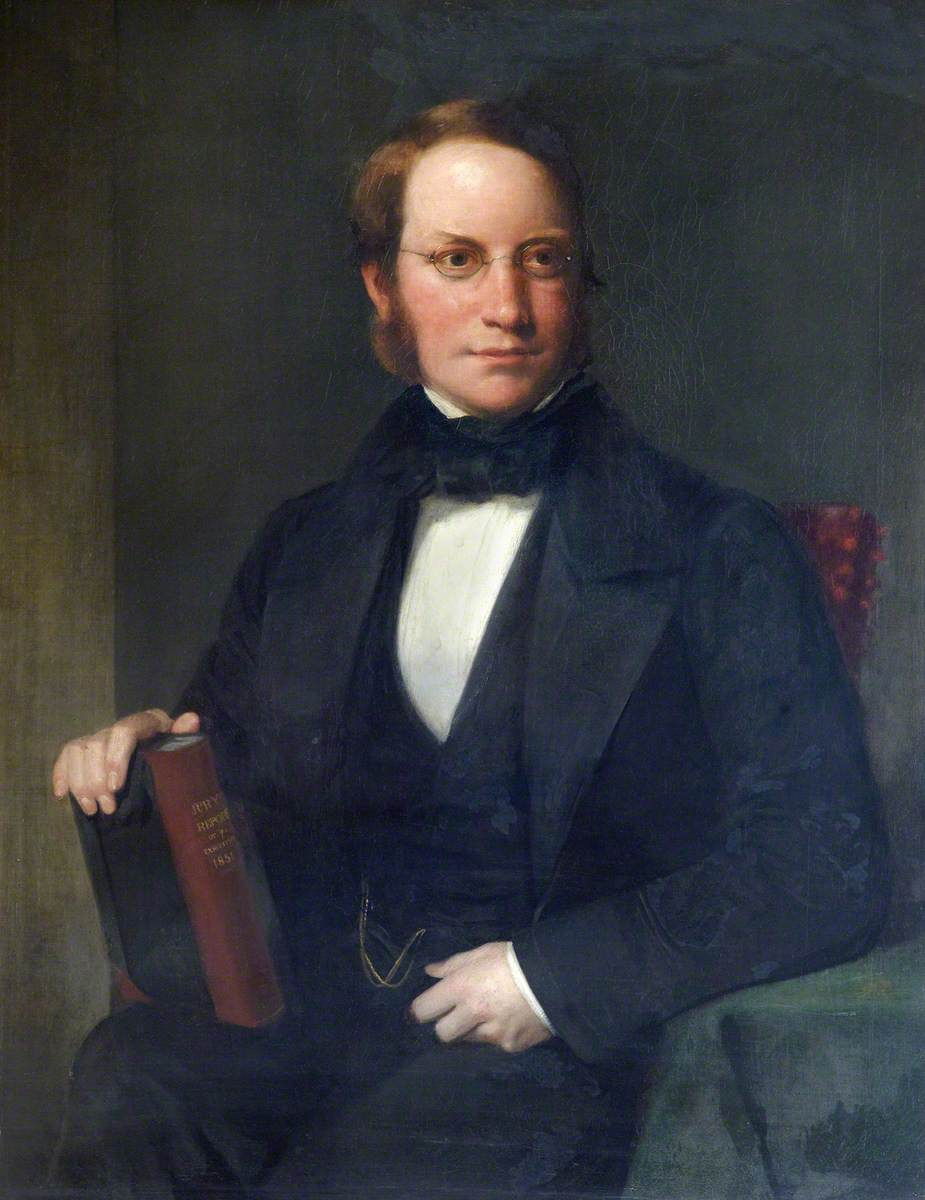
Lyon Playfair by Henry William Pickersgill

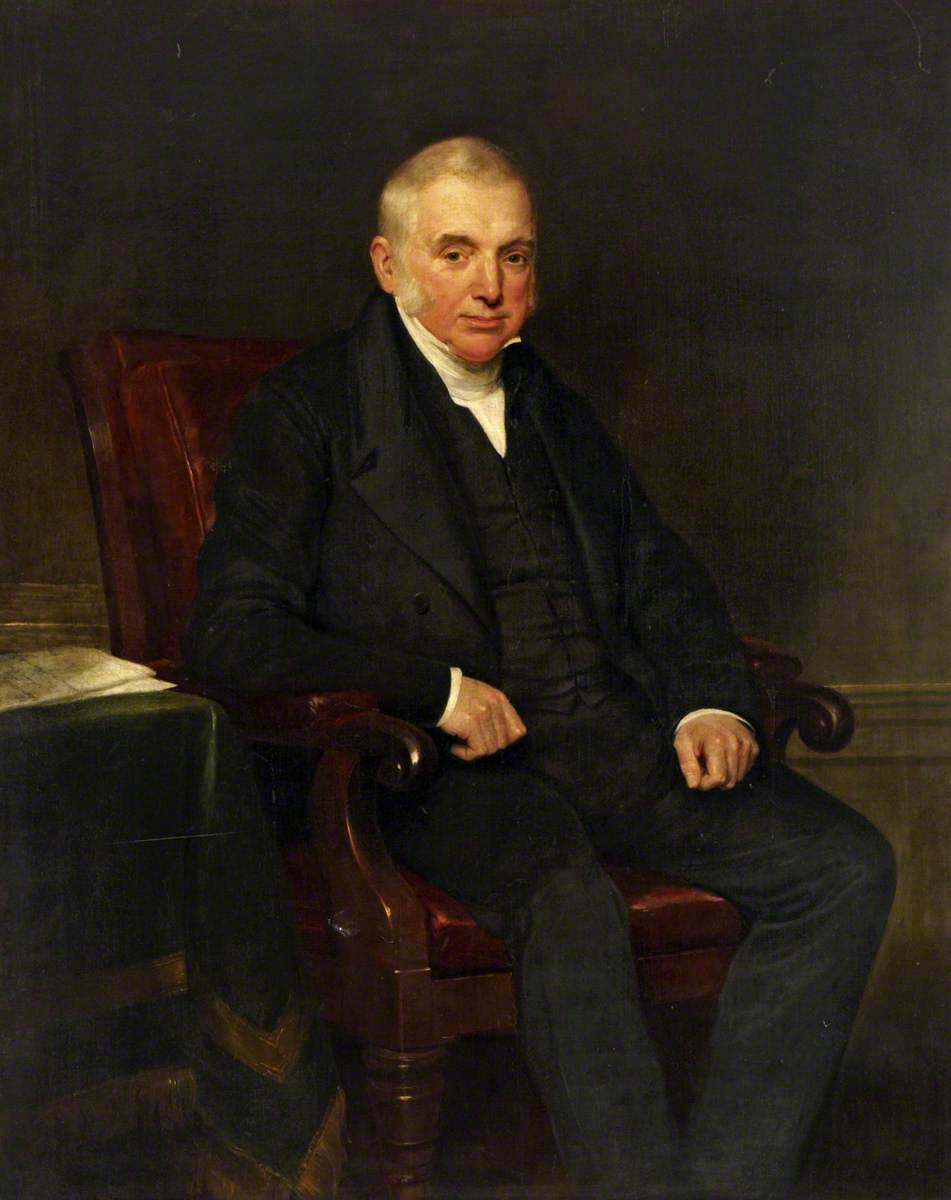
Earl Manvers by Henry William Pickersgill

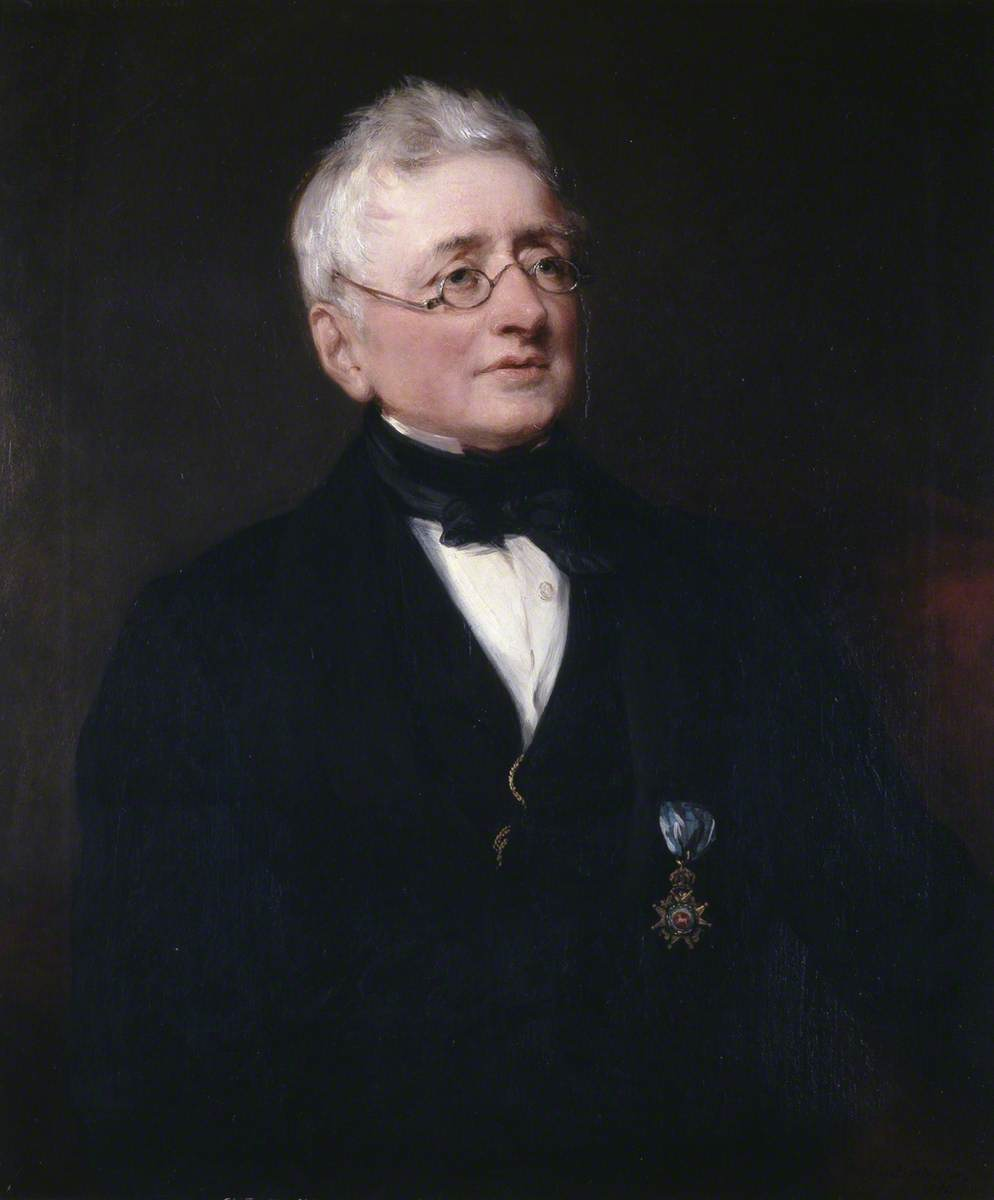
Henry Ellis by Margaret Sarah Carpenter

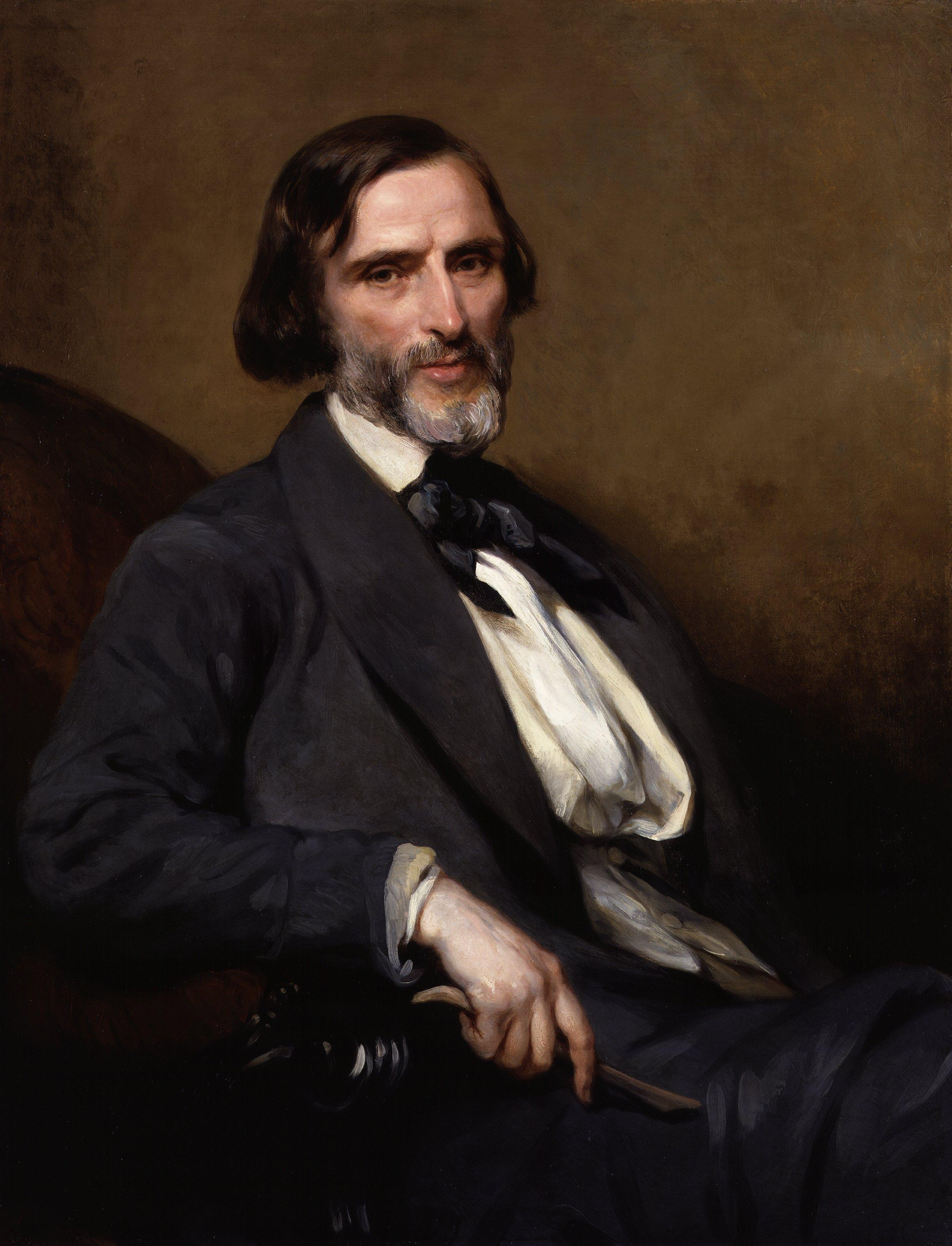
Portrait of John Gibson by Margaret Sarah Carpenter

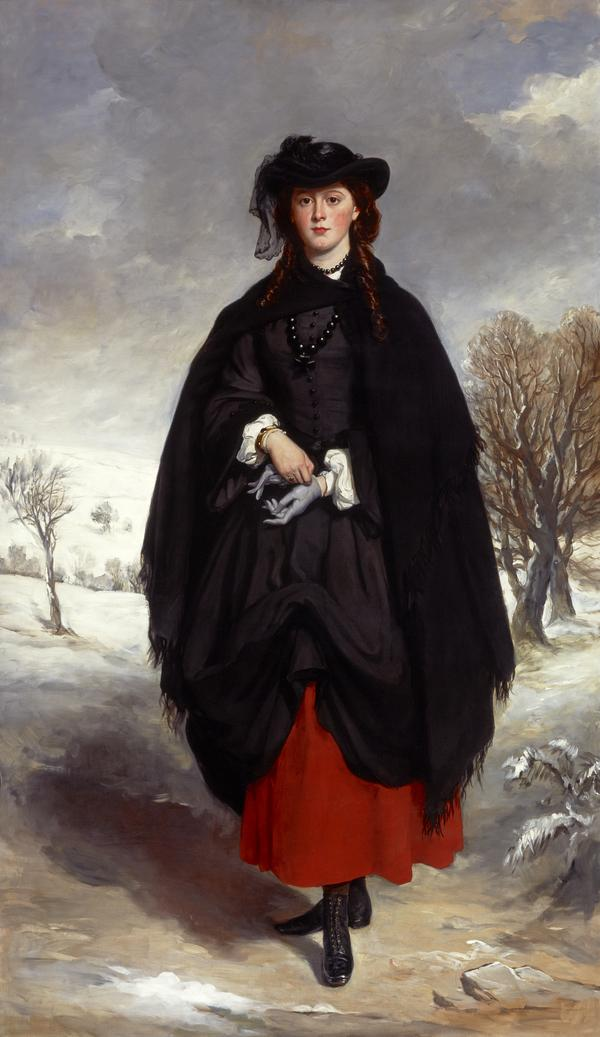
Portrait of Daisy Grant by Francis Grant

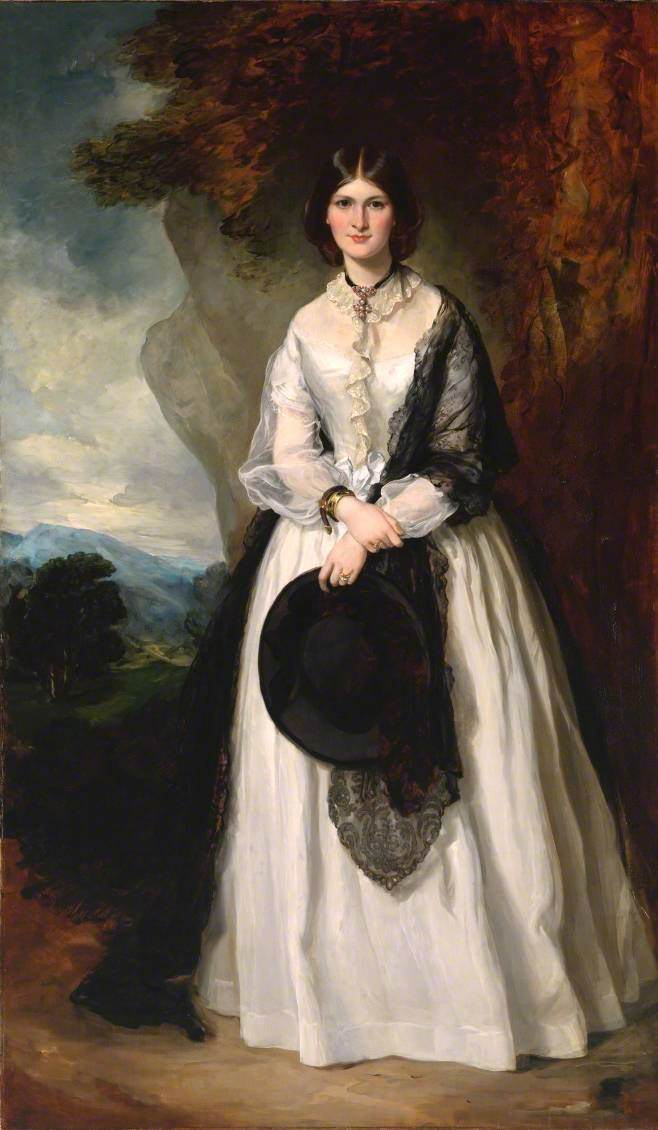
Mrs Peel by Francis Grant

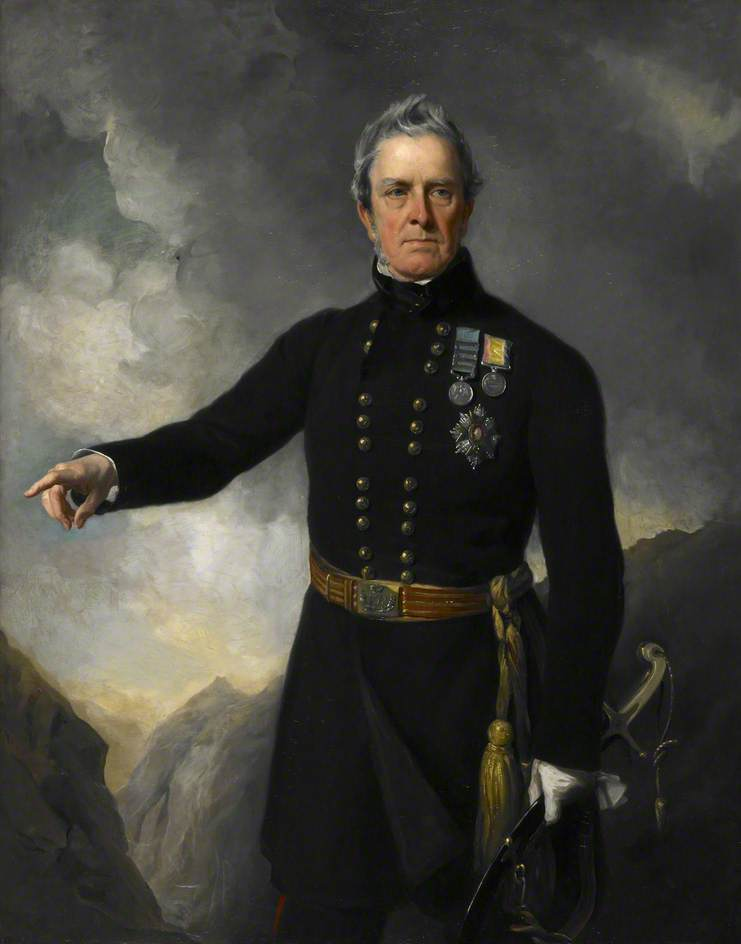
Sir George Pollock by Francis Grant

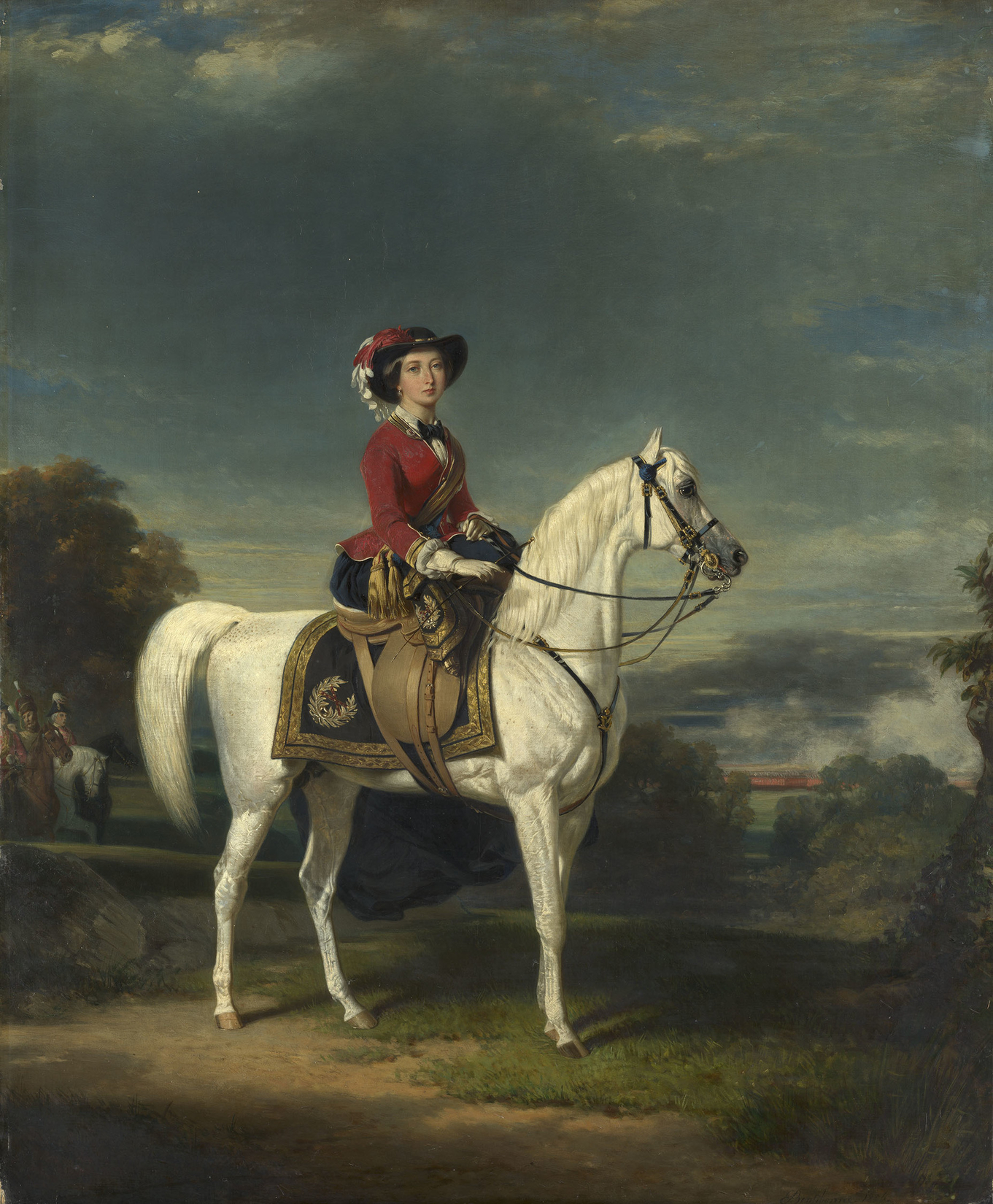
Queen Victoria by Charles-Édouard Boutibonne

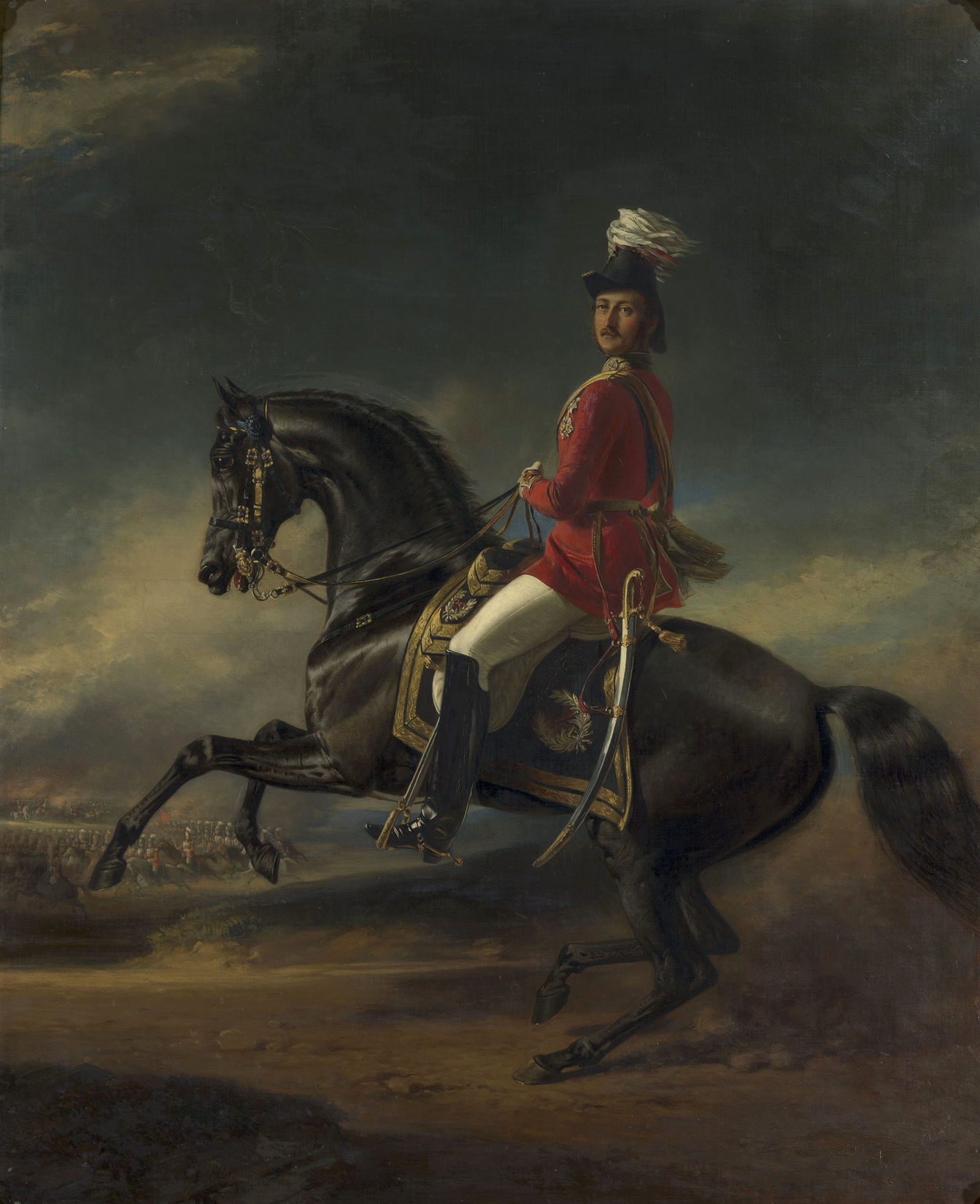
Prince Albert by Charles-Édouard Boutibonne

== See also ==
- Salon of 1857, a contemporary French exhibition held in Paris

== Bibliography ==
- Meskimmon, Marsha. Women Making Art: History, Subjectivity, Aesthetics. Routledge, 2012.
- Murray, Peter. Daniel Maclise, 1806–1870: Romancing the Past. Crawford Art Gallery, 2009.
- Ormond, Richard. Early Victorian Portraits. University of California Press, 1974.
- Pergam, Elizabeth A. The Manchester Art Treasures Exhibition of 1857. Routledge, 2017.
- Riding, Christine. John Everett Millais. Harry N. Abrams, 2006.
- Van der Merwe, Pieter & Took, Roger. The Spectacular Career of Clarkson Stanfield. Tyne and Wear County Council Museums, 1979.
- Wills, Catherine. High Society: The Life and Art of Sir Francis Grant, 1803–1878. National Galleries of Scotland, 2003.
