= A Painter =

A Painter may refer to:

- A Painter (Meissonier), an 1855 painting by Ernest Meissonier
- A Painter (film), a 2013 Danish short film

== See also ==
- Painter (disambiguation)
