= Salon of 1857 =

1857 art exhibition in Paris

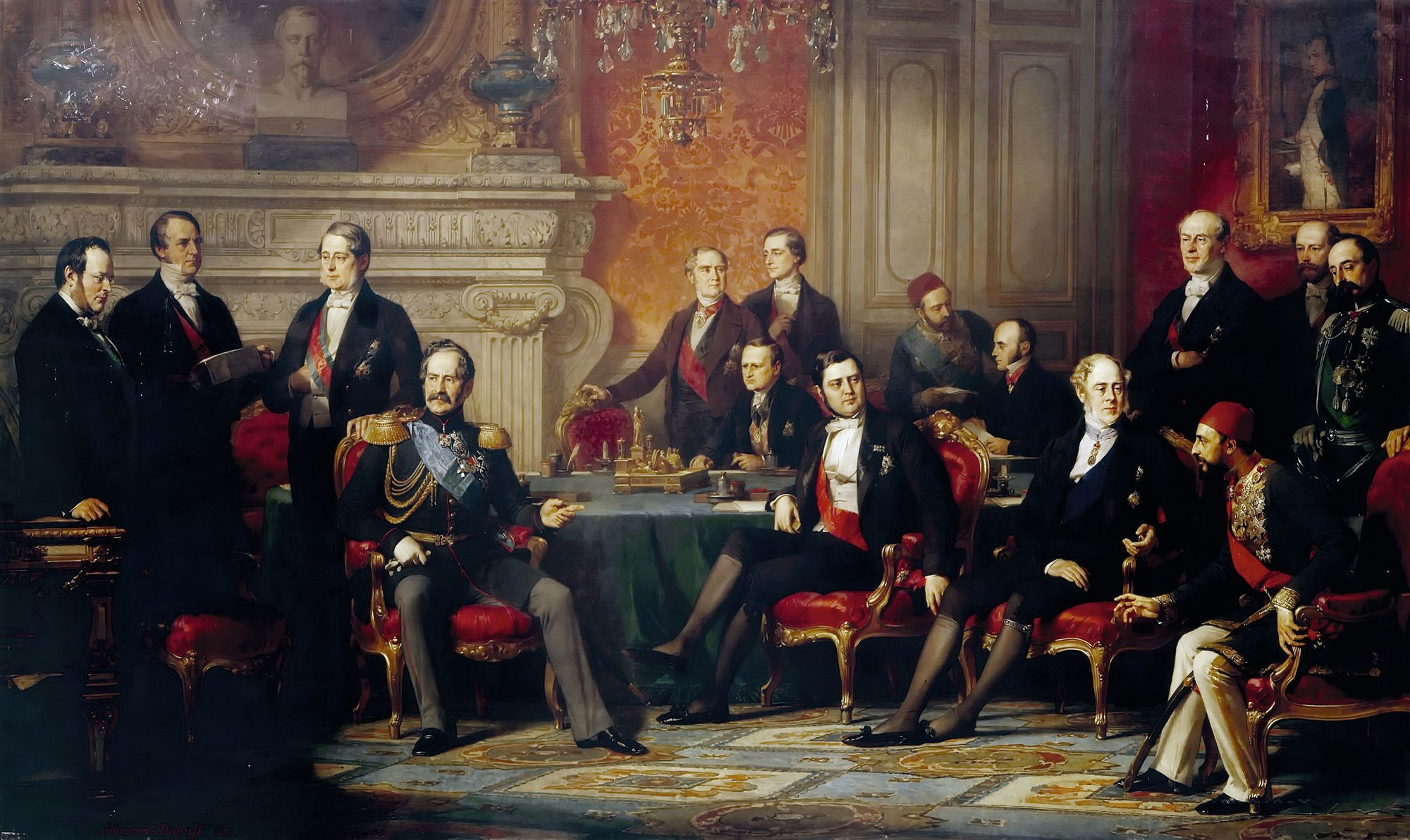
The Congress of Paris by Édouard Dubufe

The Salon of 1857 was an art exhibition held in Paris, as part of the regular tradition of Salons. It was held at the Palace of Industry built for the Exposition Universelle in 1855. Organised by the Académie des Beaux-Arts, it opened on 15 June 1857. The Salon reverted to its traditional formal after the Salon of 1855, part of the Exposition Universelle, which had featured a large number of retrospective works from both France and elsewhere. The number of French artists selected to display work increased by nearly 400 between the two salons. For the first time the Salon accepted submissions of photography which was increasingly accepted as an art form in its own right.

Amongst paintings on display were The Congress of Paris by Édouard Dubufe depicting the diplomatic gathering of the same name that brought an end to the Crimean War. The Medal of Honour was awarded to The Capture of the Tower at Malakoff by Adolphe Yvon, featuring a key moment of the conflict. MJean-Léon Gérôme enjoyed great public success with The Duel After the Masquerade. The author Jules Verne reviewed the Salon in a series of articles.

== Gallery ==
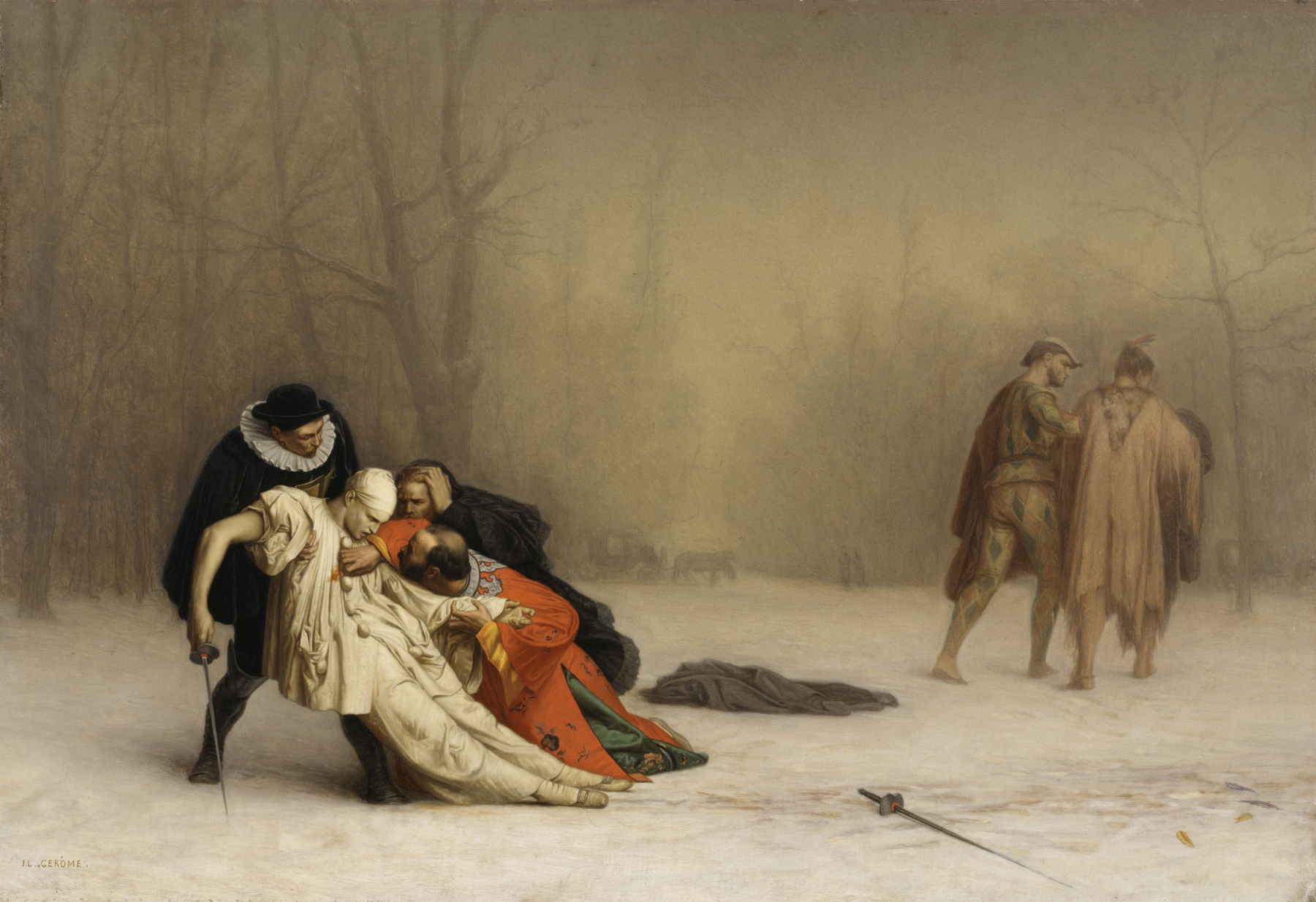
The Duel After the Masquerade by Jean-Léon Gérôme

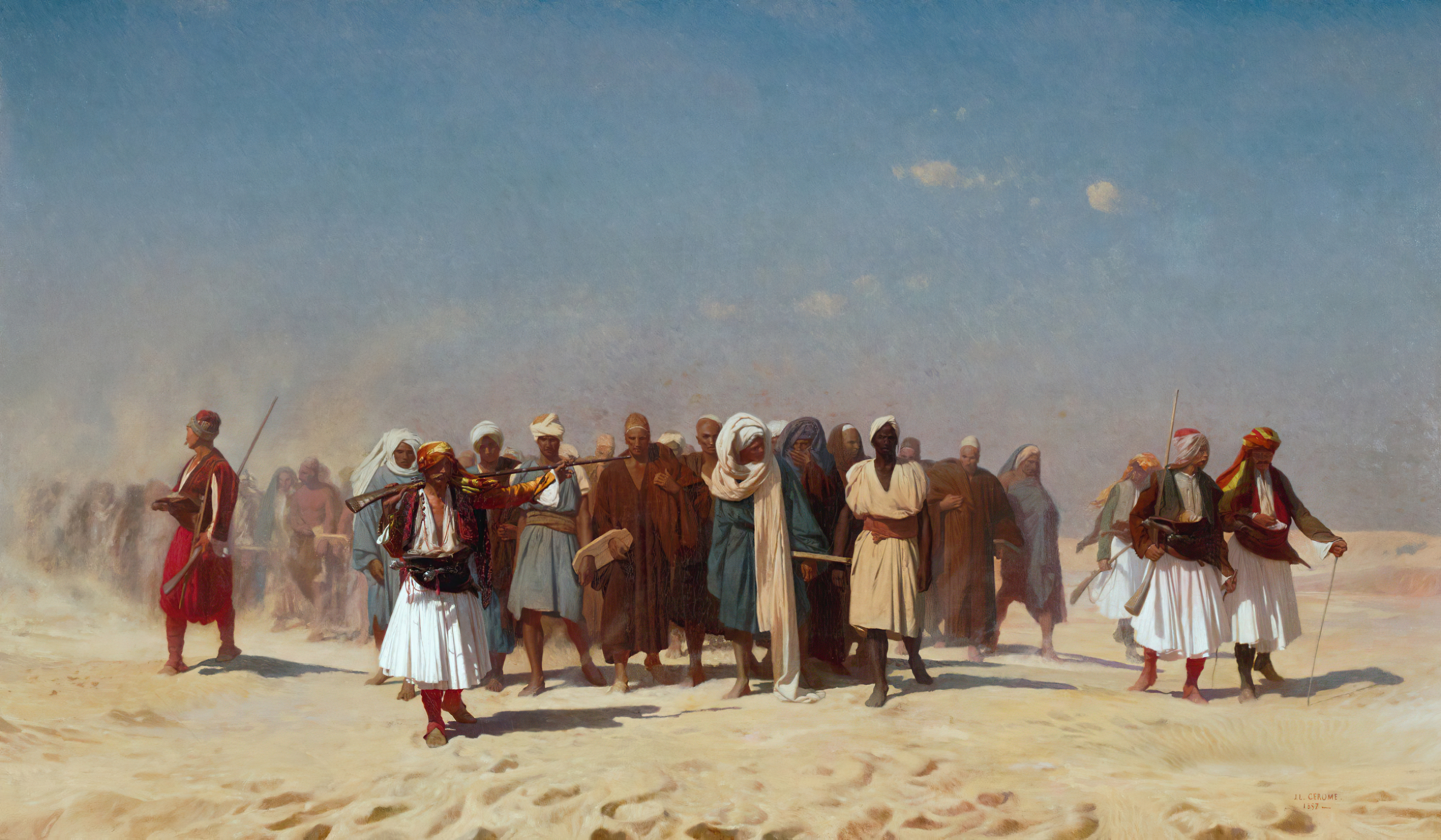
Egyptian Recruits Crossing the Desert by Jean-Léon Gérôme

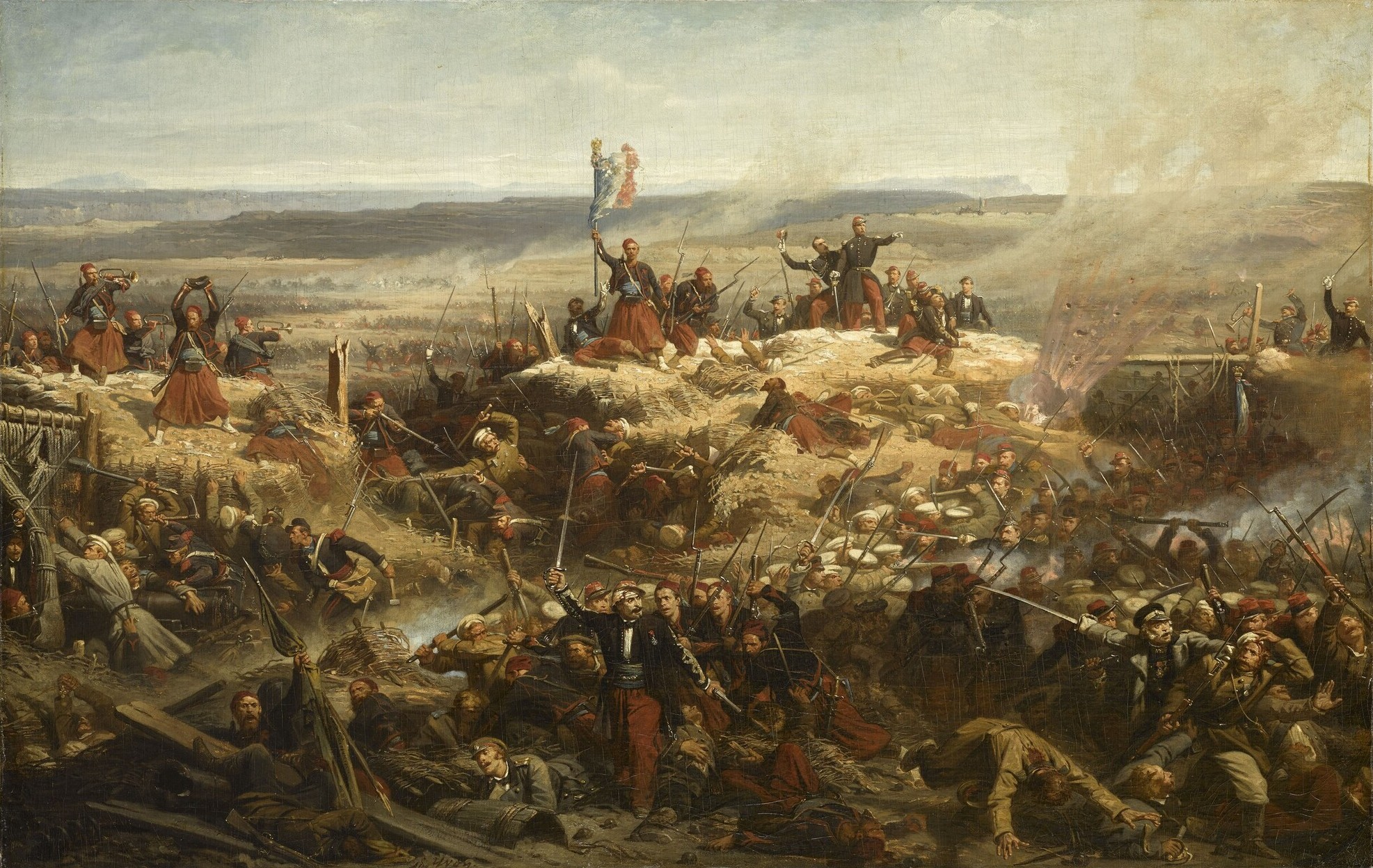
The Capture of the Tower at Malakoff by Adolphe Yvon

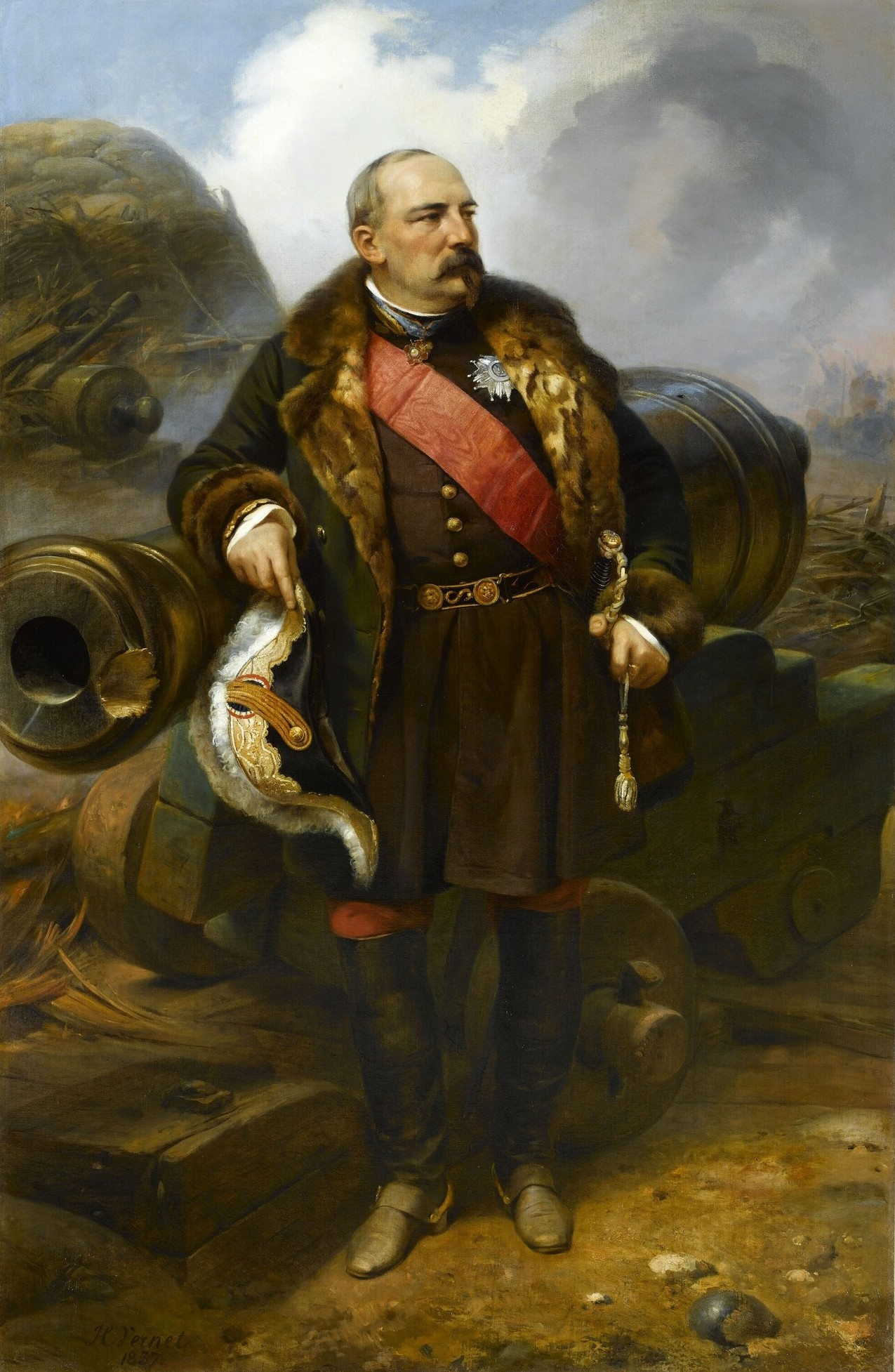
Portrait of Pierre Bosquet by Horace Vernet

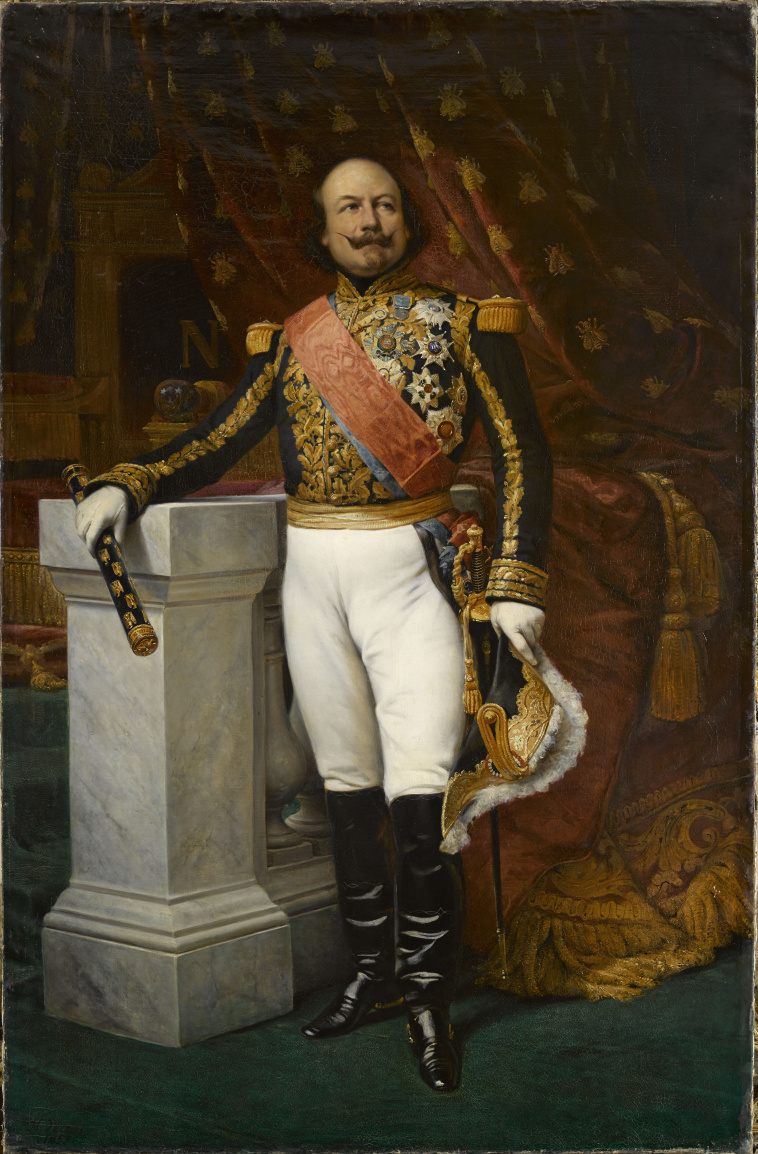
Portrait of Marshal Canrobert by Horace Vernet

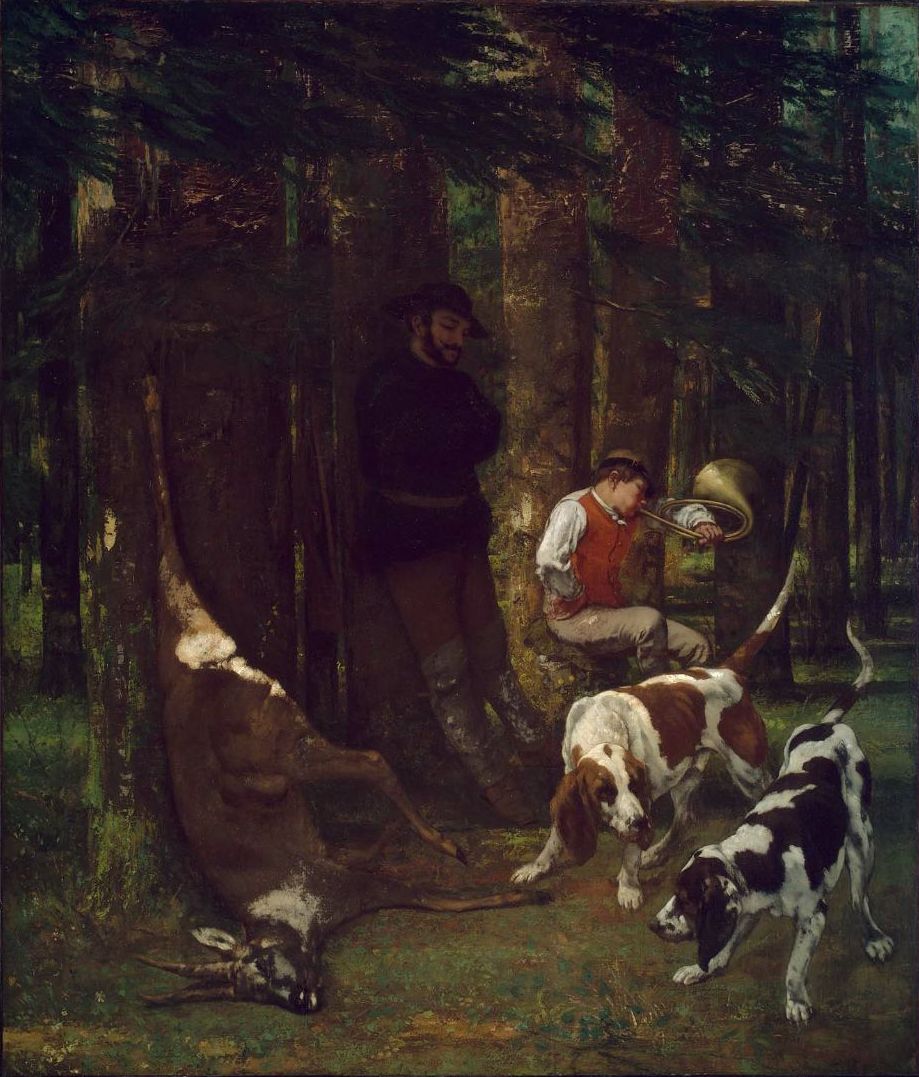
The Quarry by Gustave Courbet

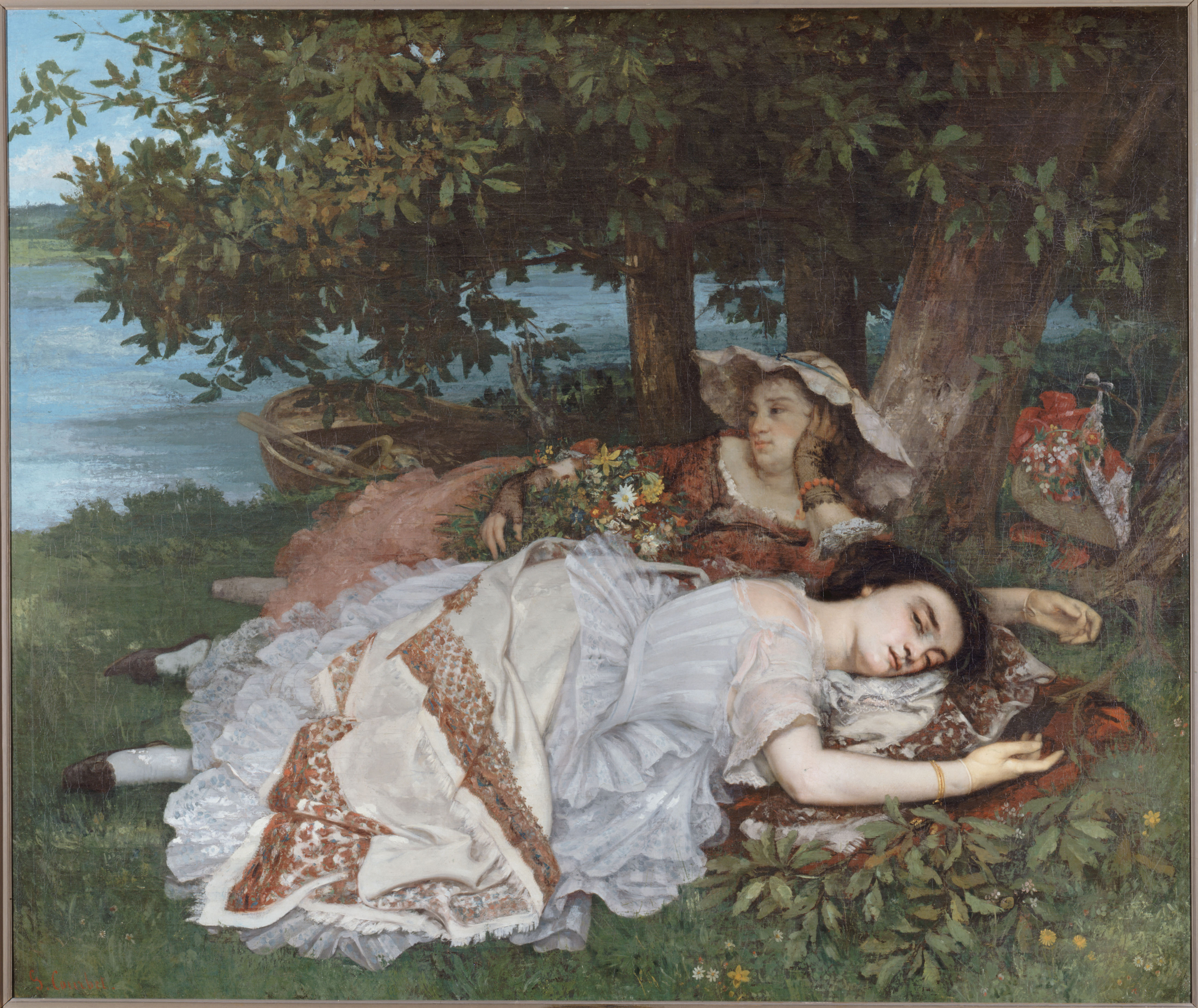
Young Ladies Beside the Seine by Gustave Courbet

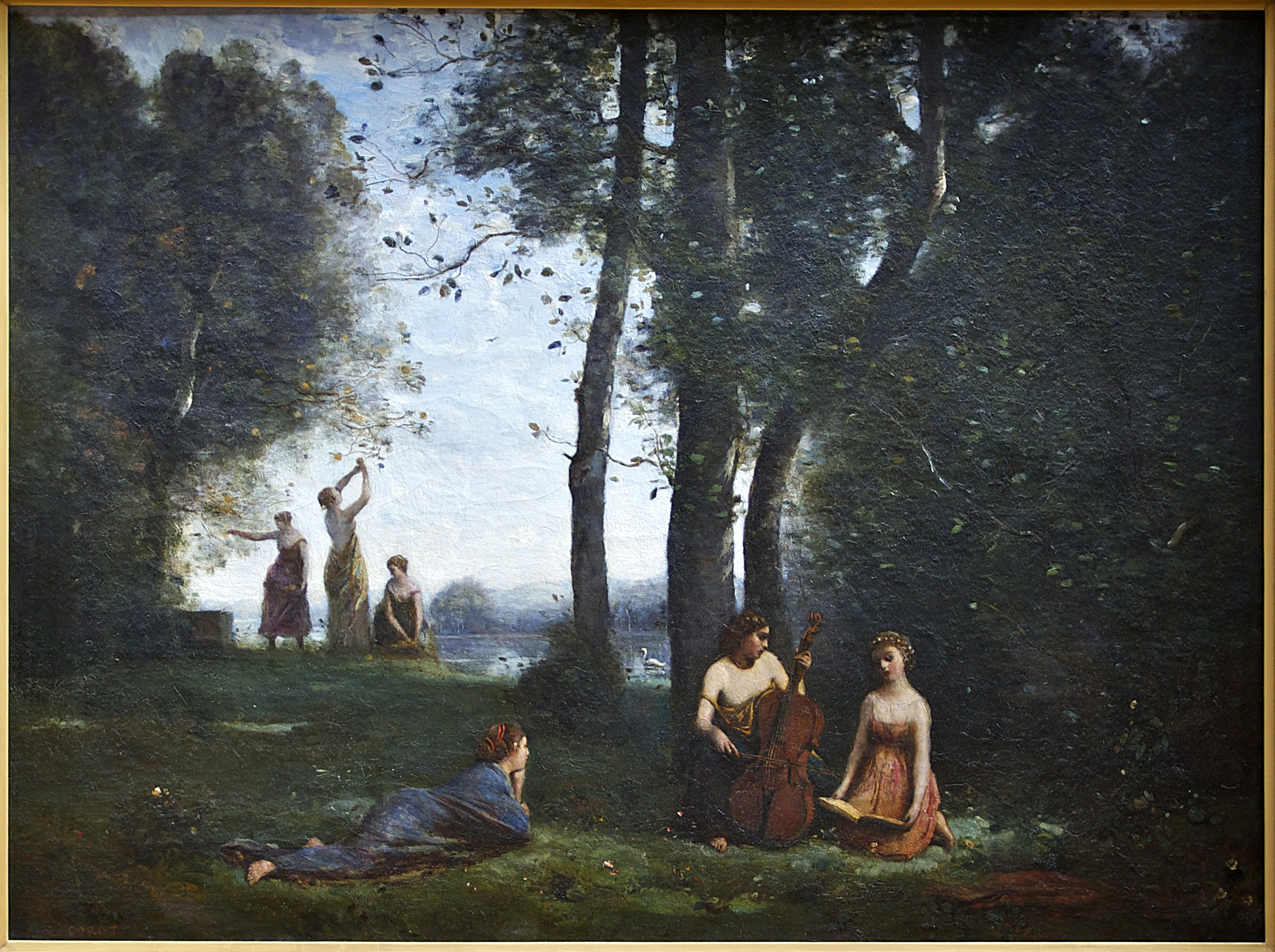
Le concert champêtre by Jean-Baptiste-Camille Corot

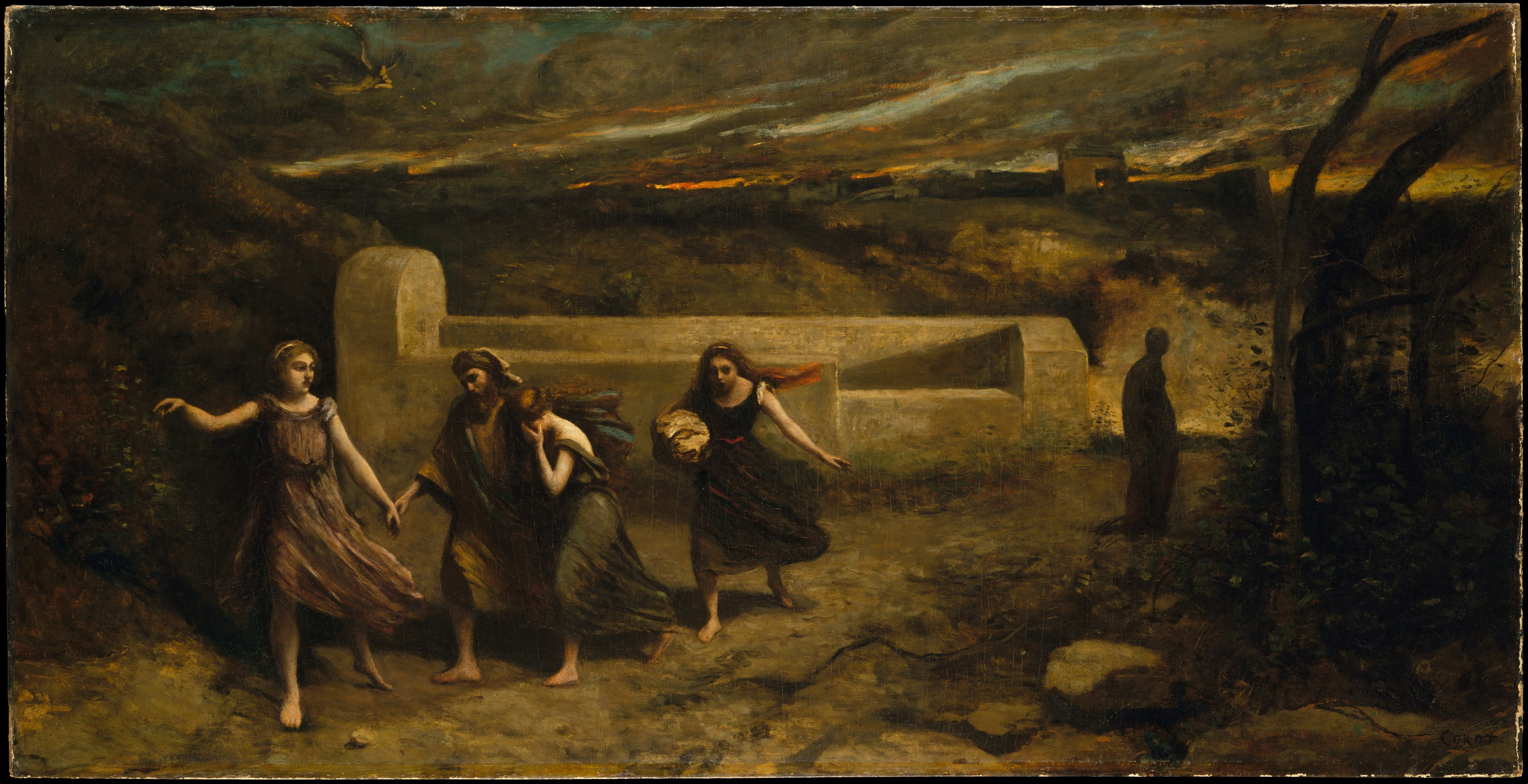
The Destruction of Sodom by Jean-Baptiste-Camille Corot

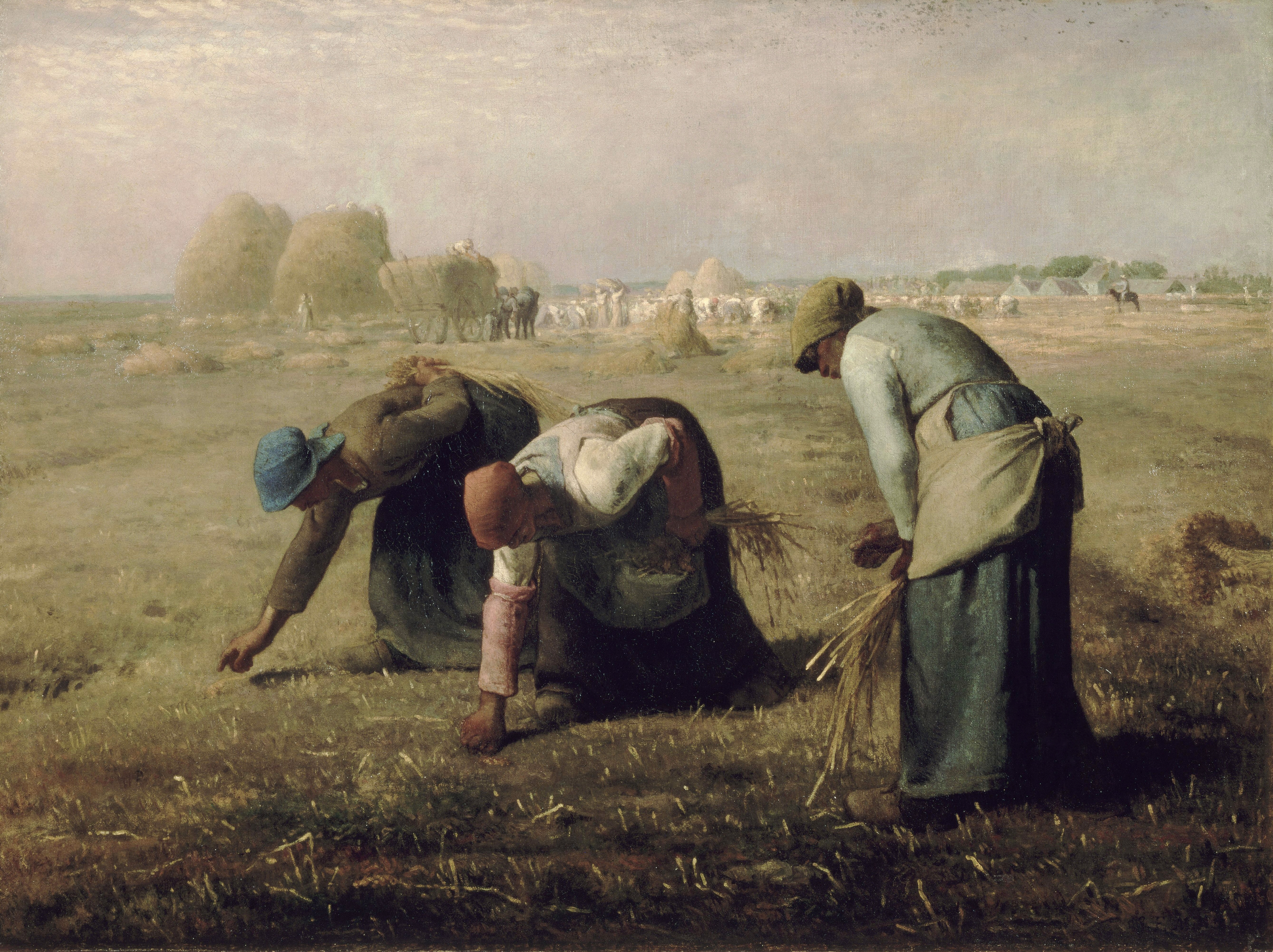
The Gleaners by Jean-François Millet

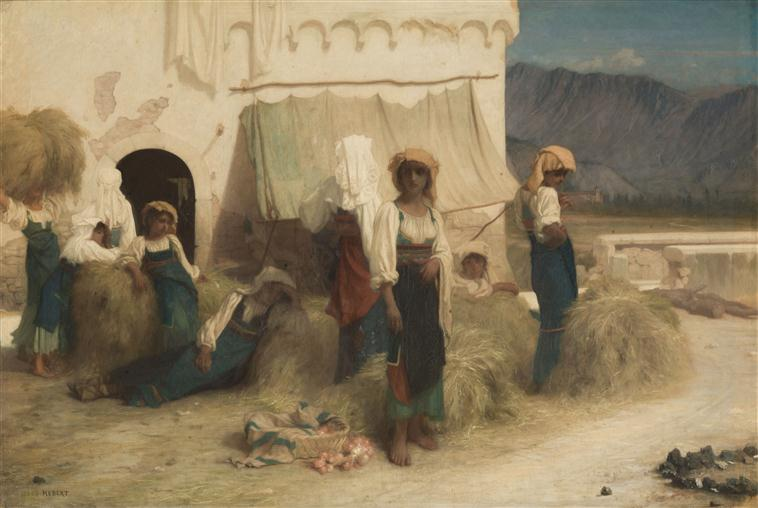
The Hay Harvesters of San Germano by Ernest Hébert

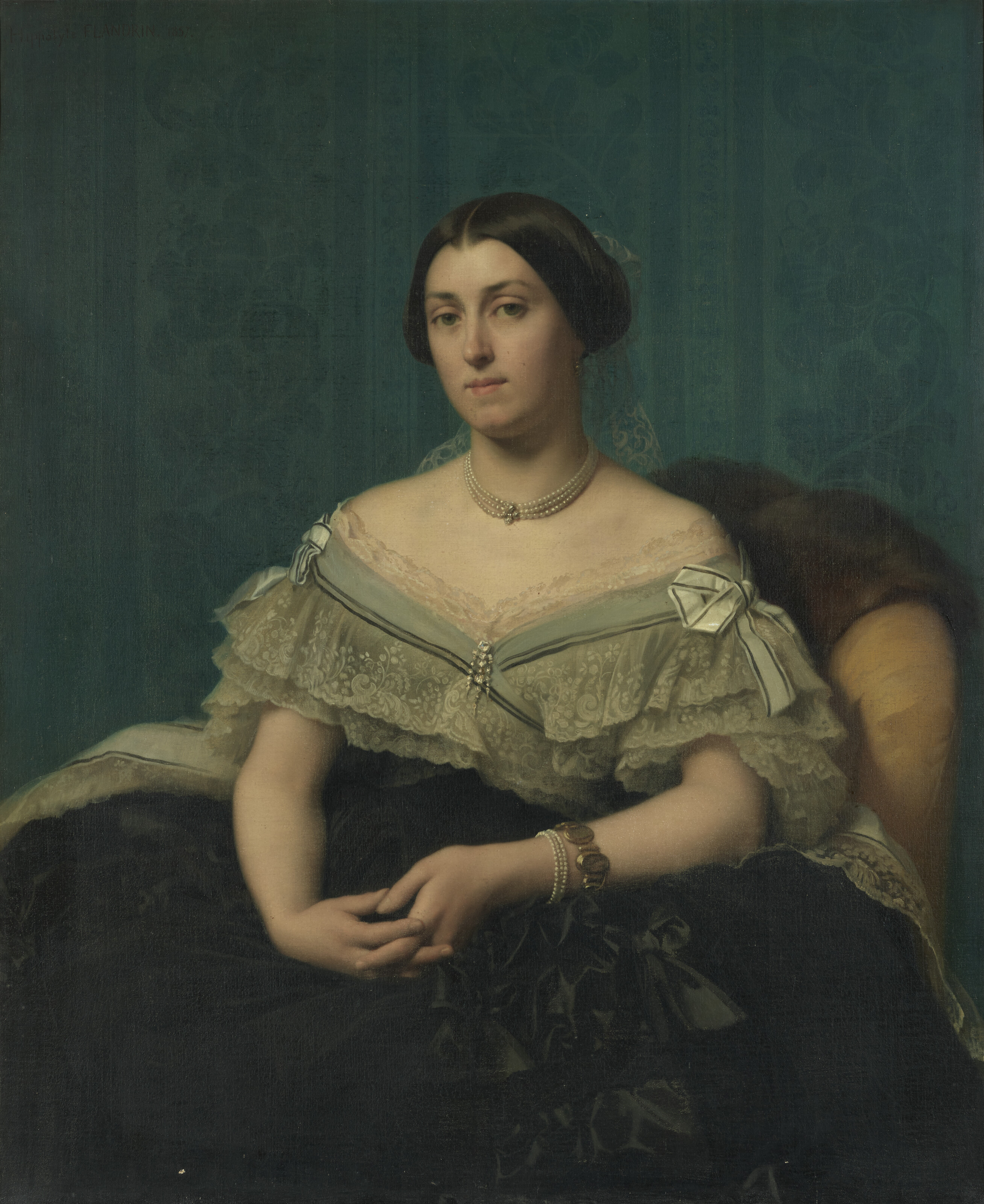
Portrait of Marie Legentil by Hippolyte Flandrin

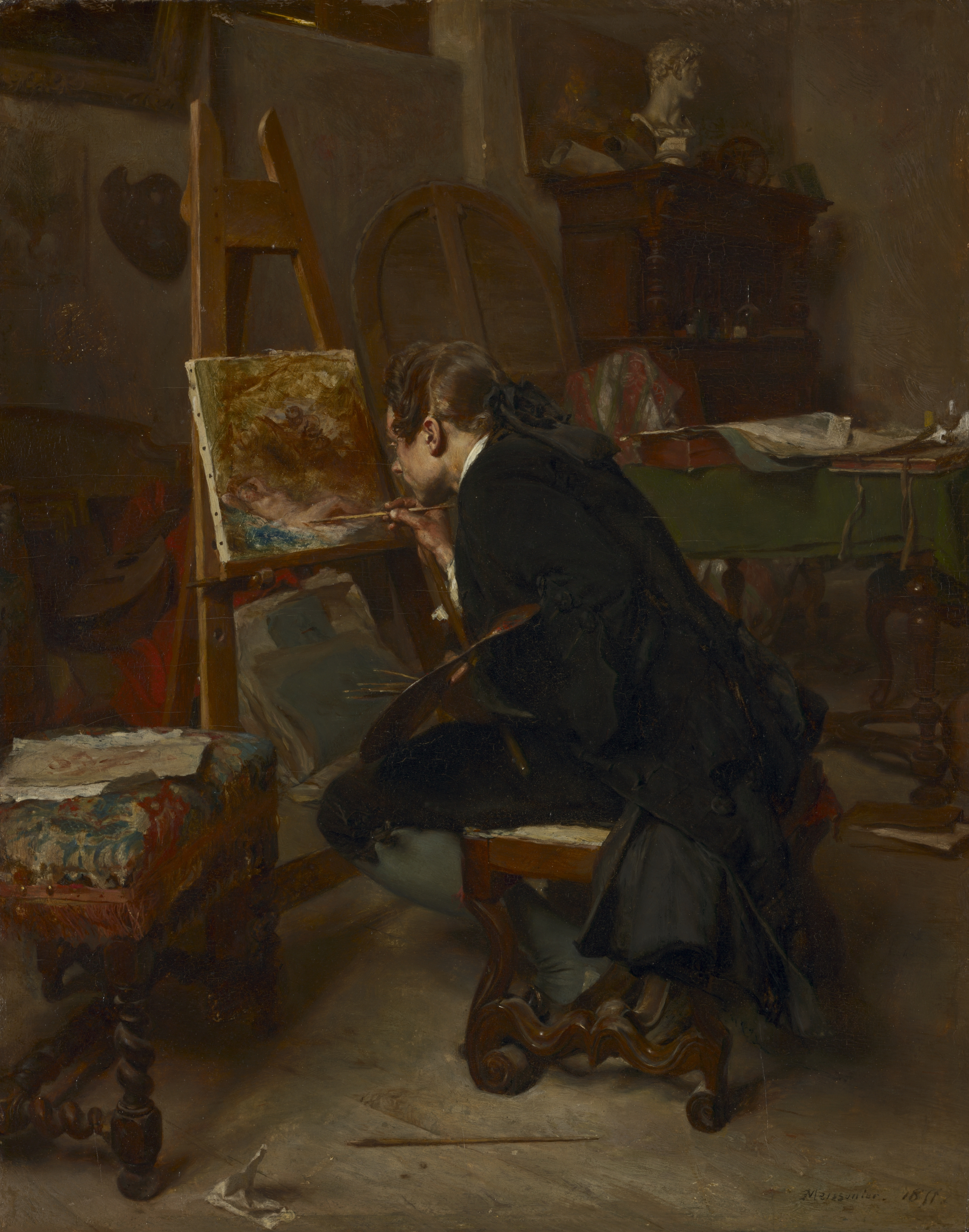
A Painter by Ernest Meissonier

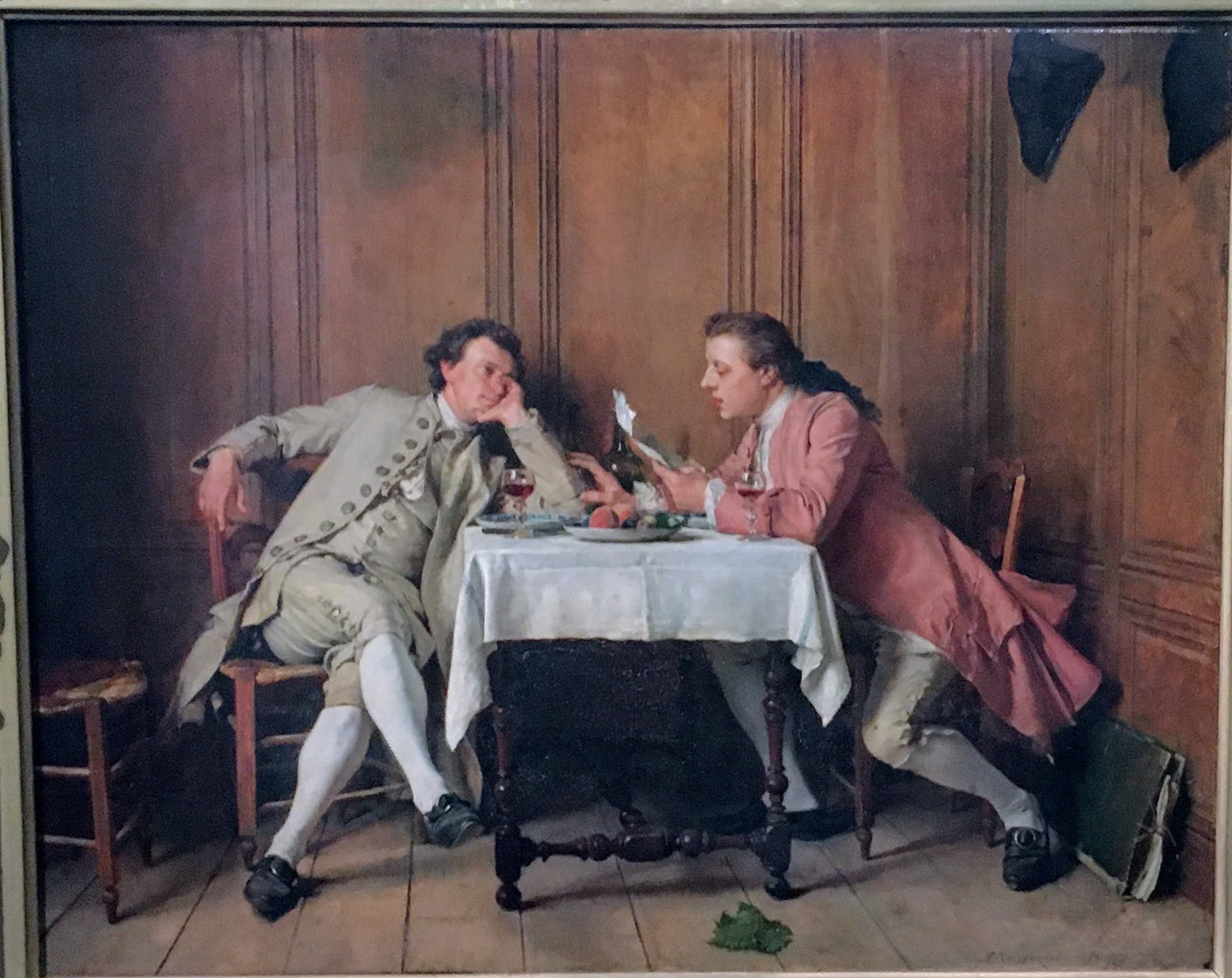
La Confidence by Ernest Meissonier

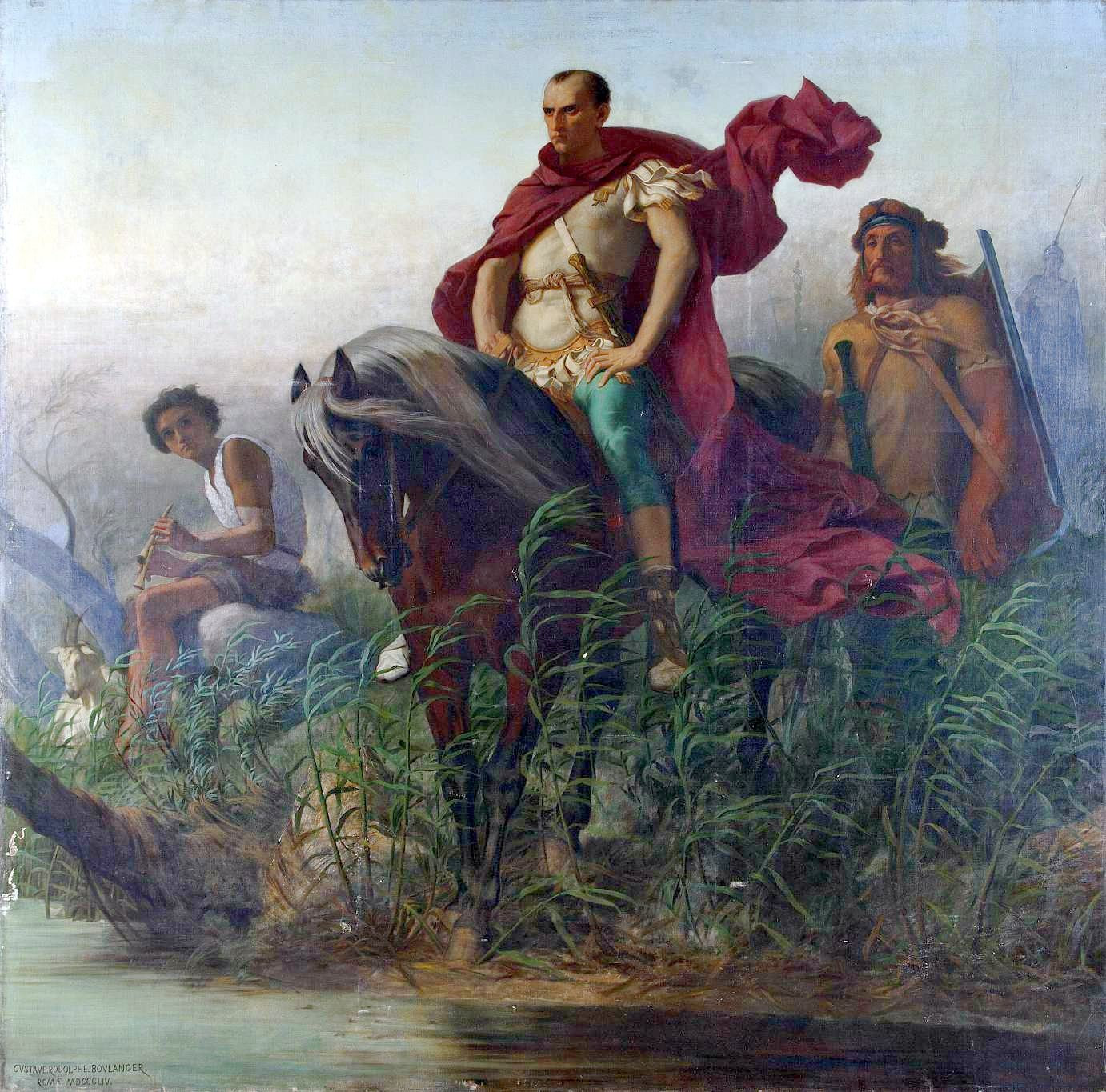
Julius Caesar Arriving at the Rubicon by Gustave Boulanger

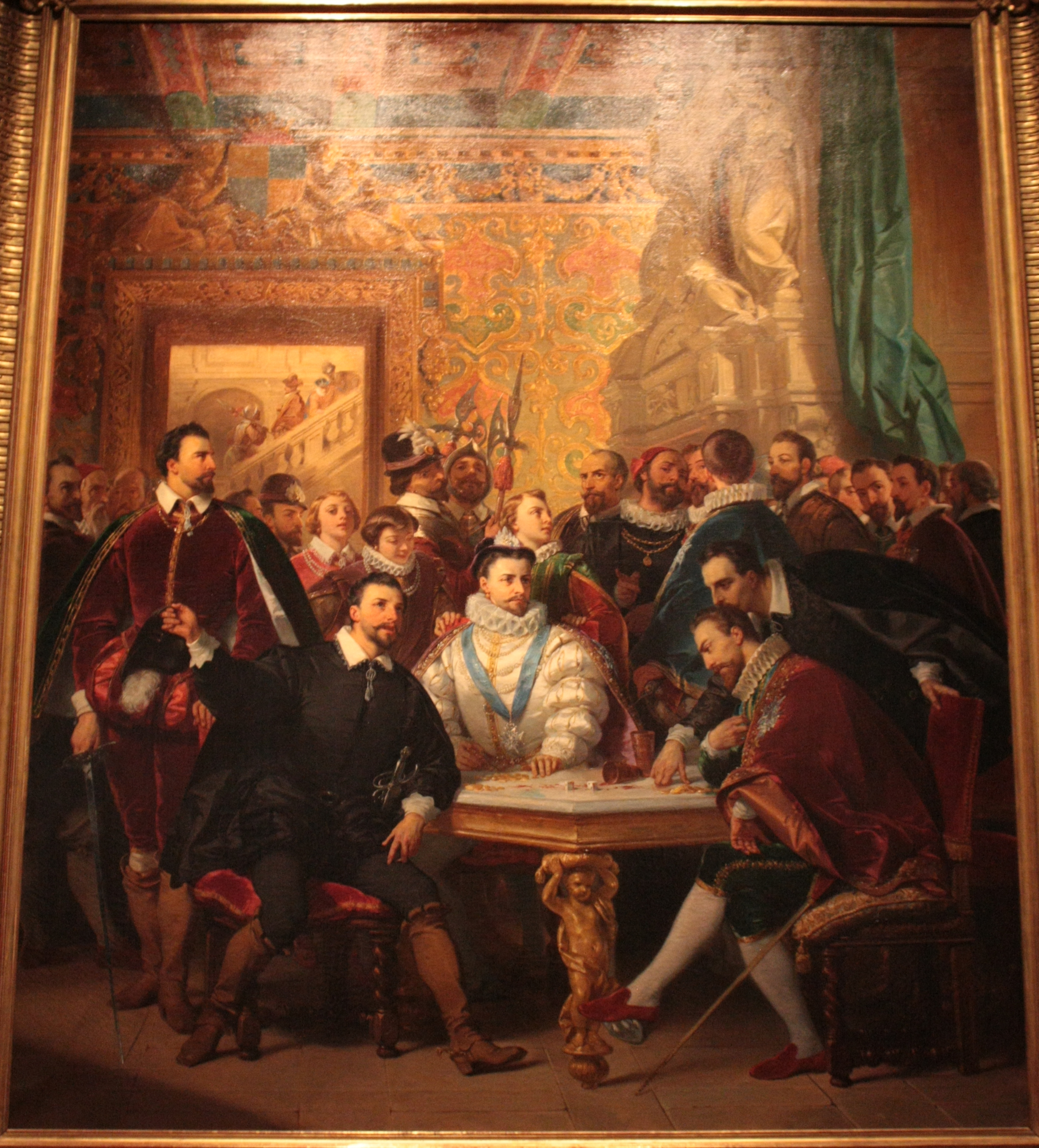
The Four Henris by Eugène Devéria

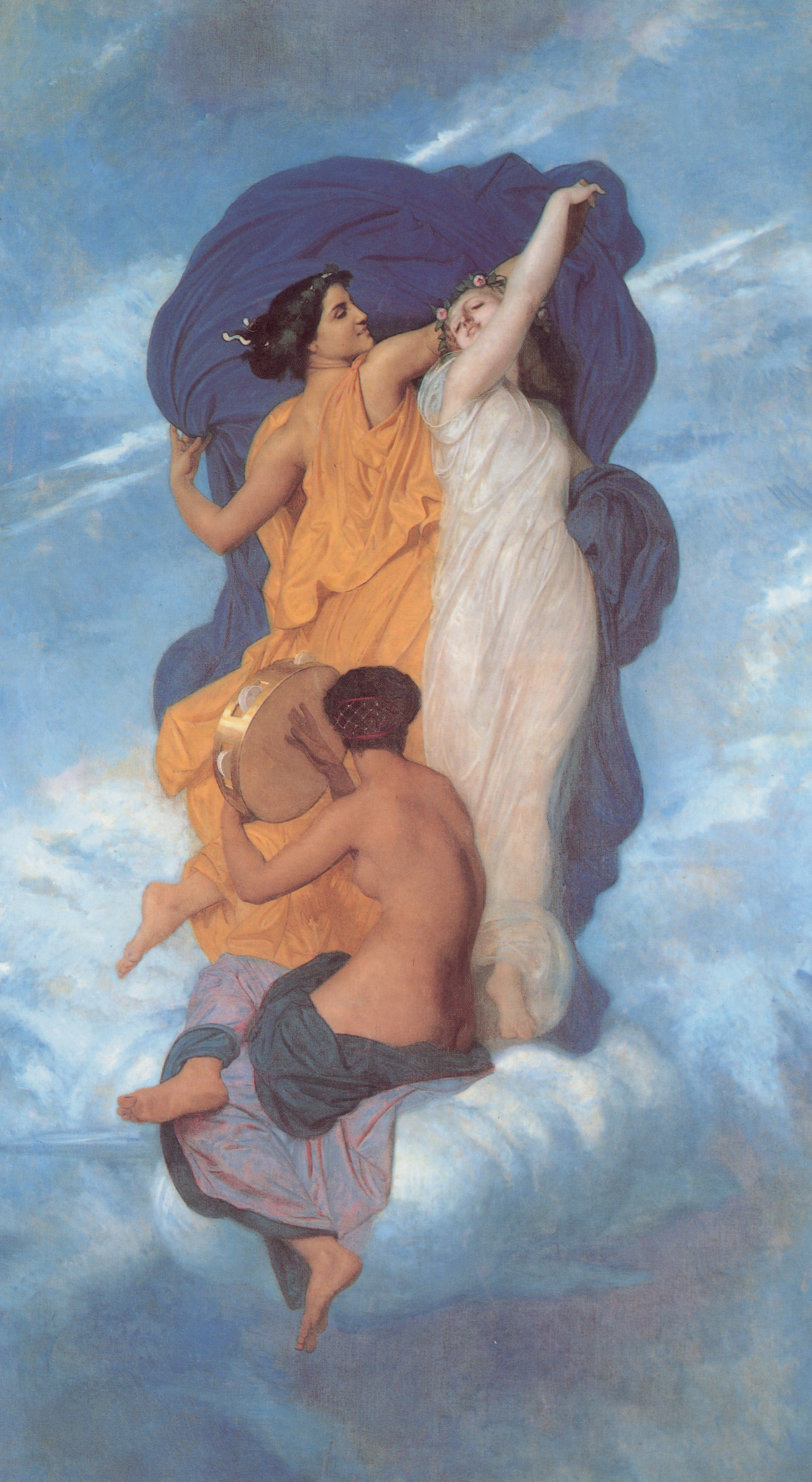
La Danse by William-Adolphe Bouguereau

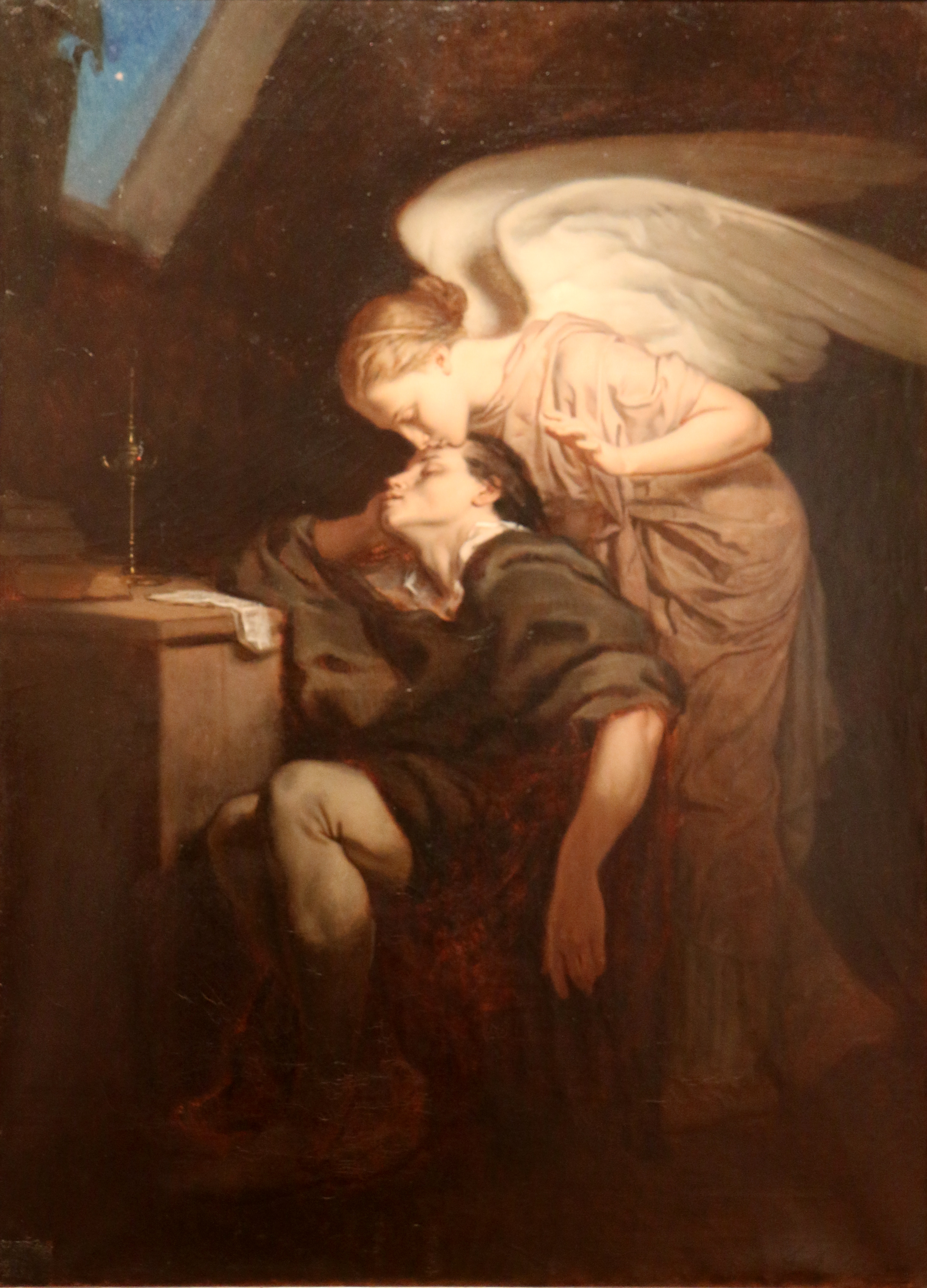
The Kiss of the Muse by Félix Nicolas Frillié

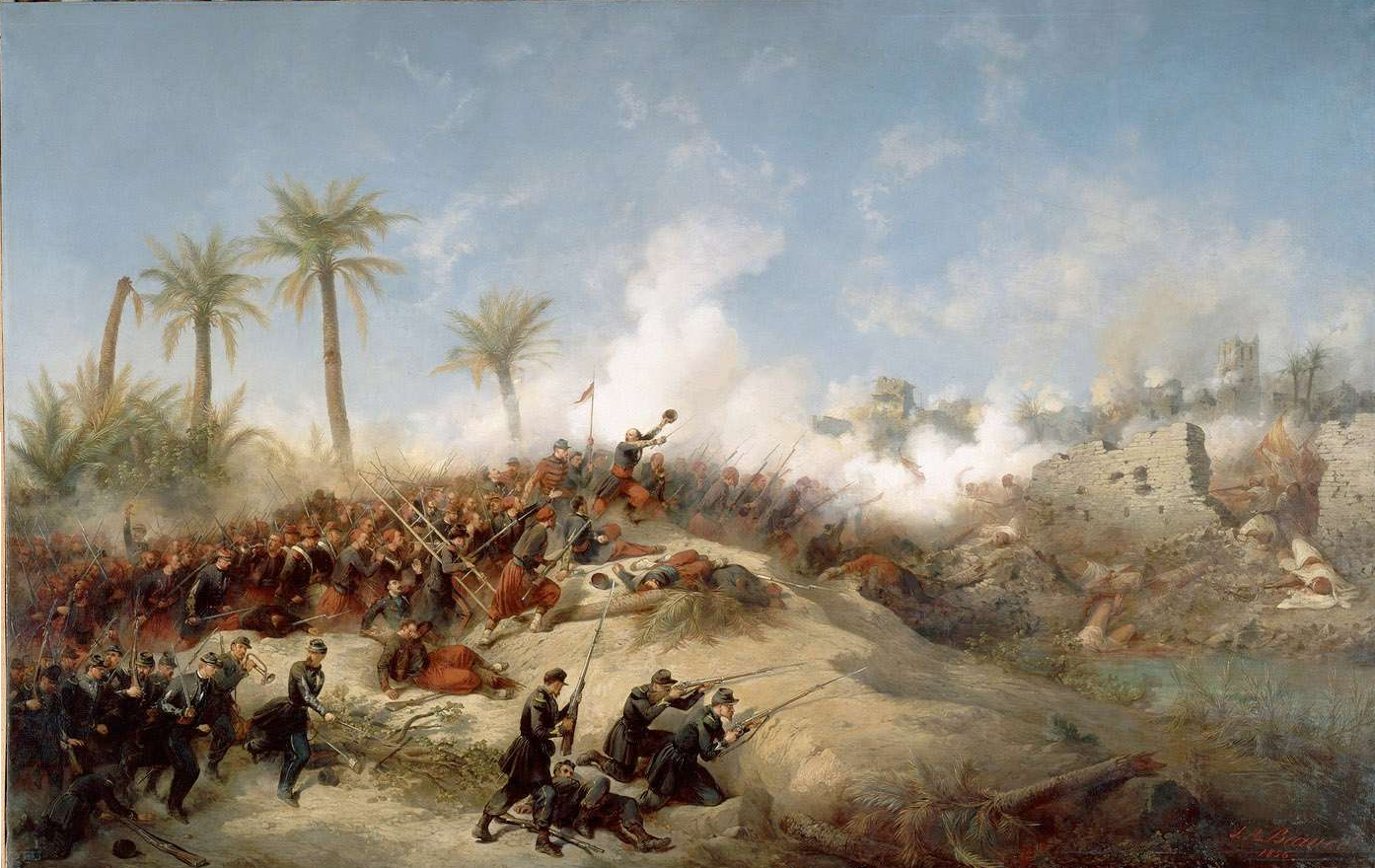
The Assault on Zaatcha by Jean-Adolphe Beaucé

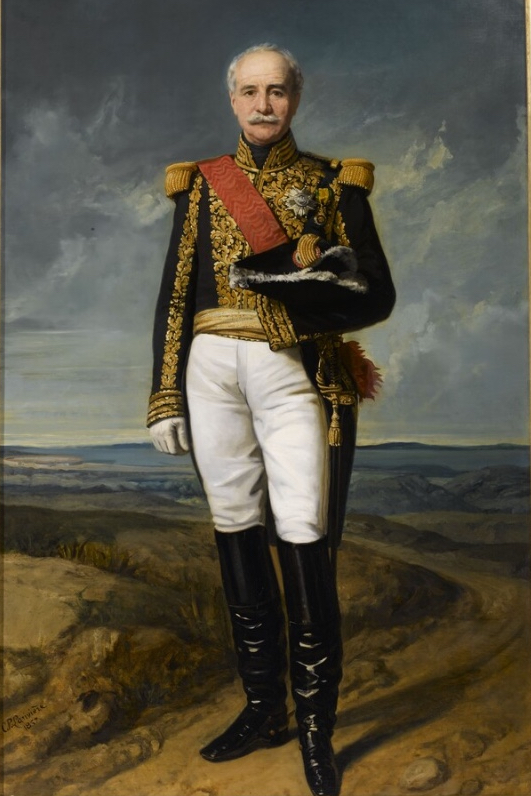
Portrait of Achille Baraguey d'Hilliers by Charles-Philippe Larivière

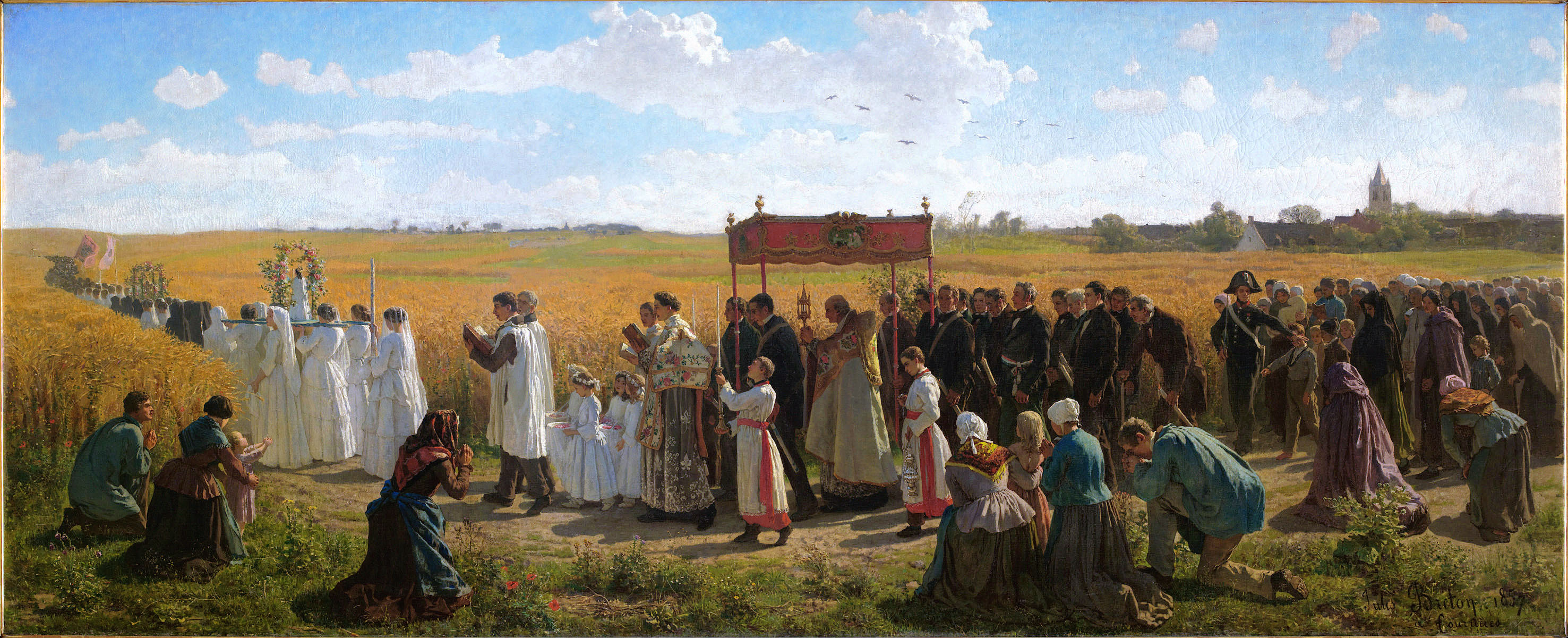
The Blessing of the Wheat in Artois by Jules Breton

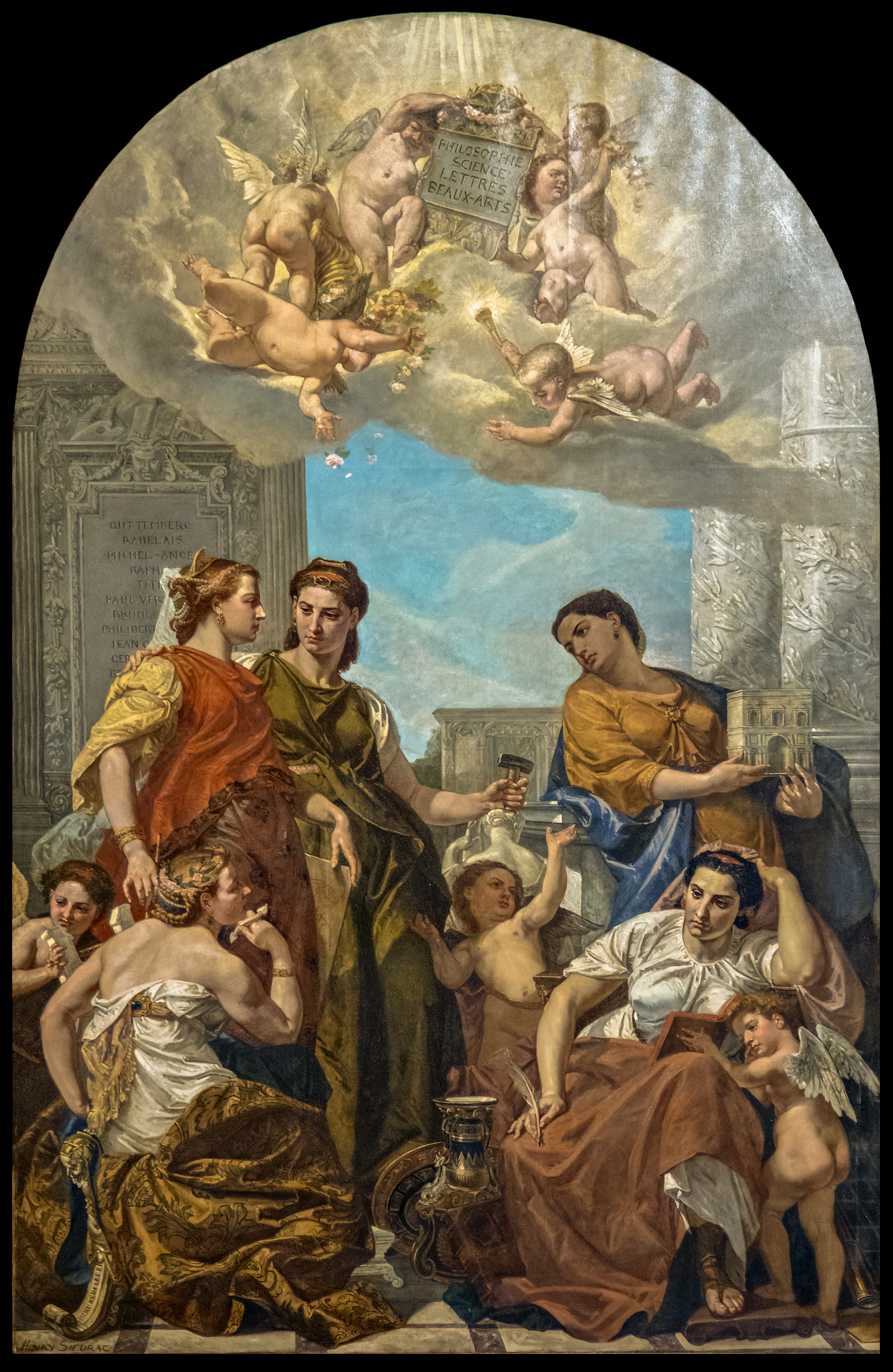
The Renaissance of Arts and Literature by Henri Sieurac

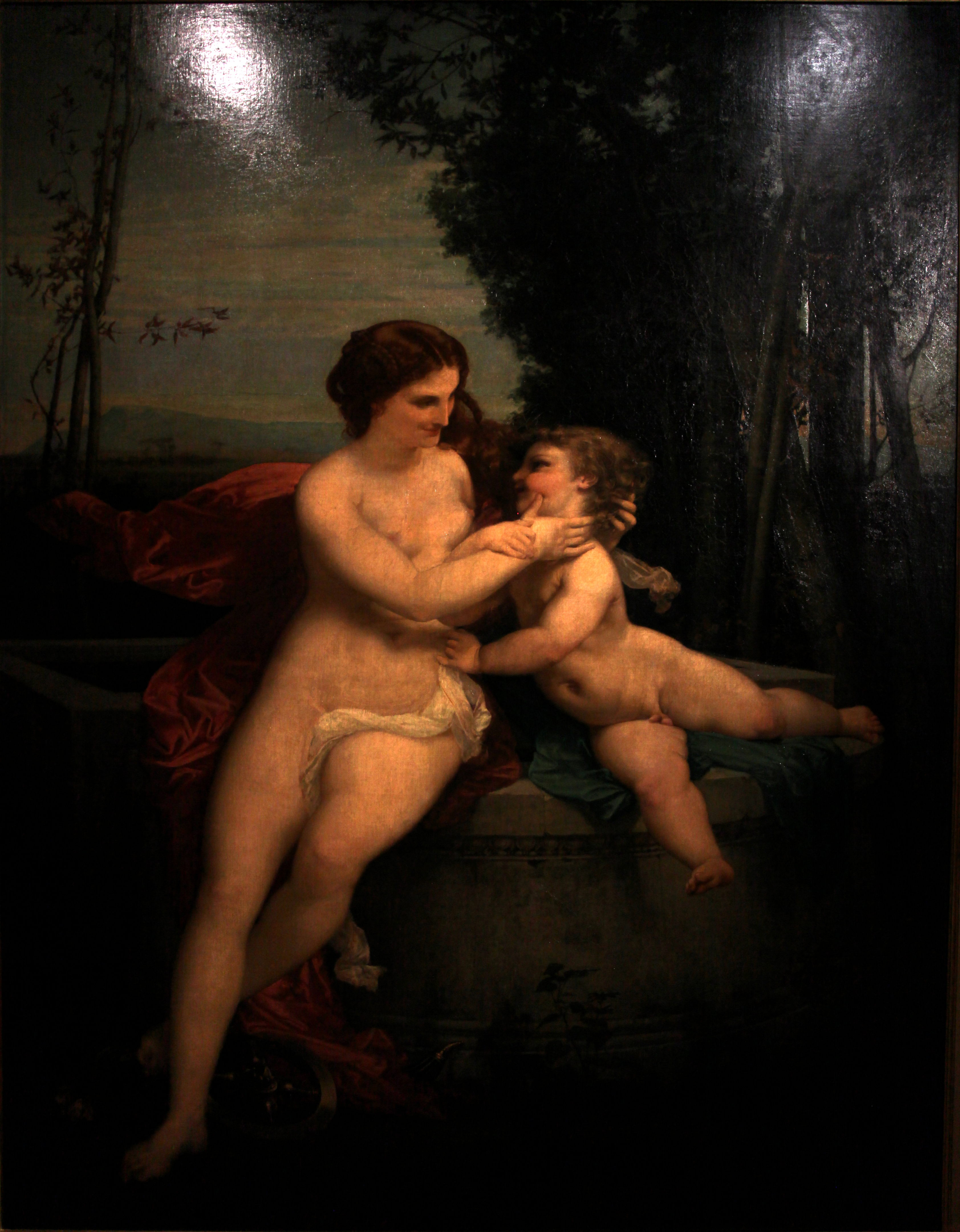
Fortune and the Young Child by Paul-Jacques-Aimé Baudry

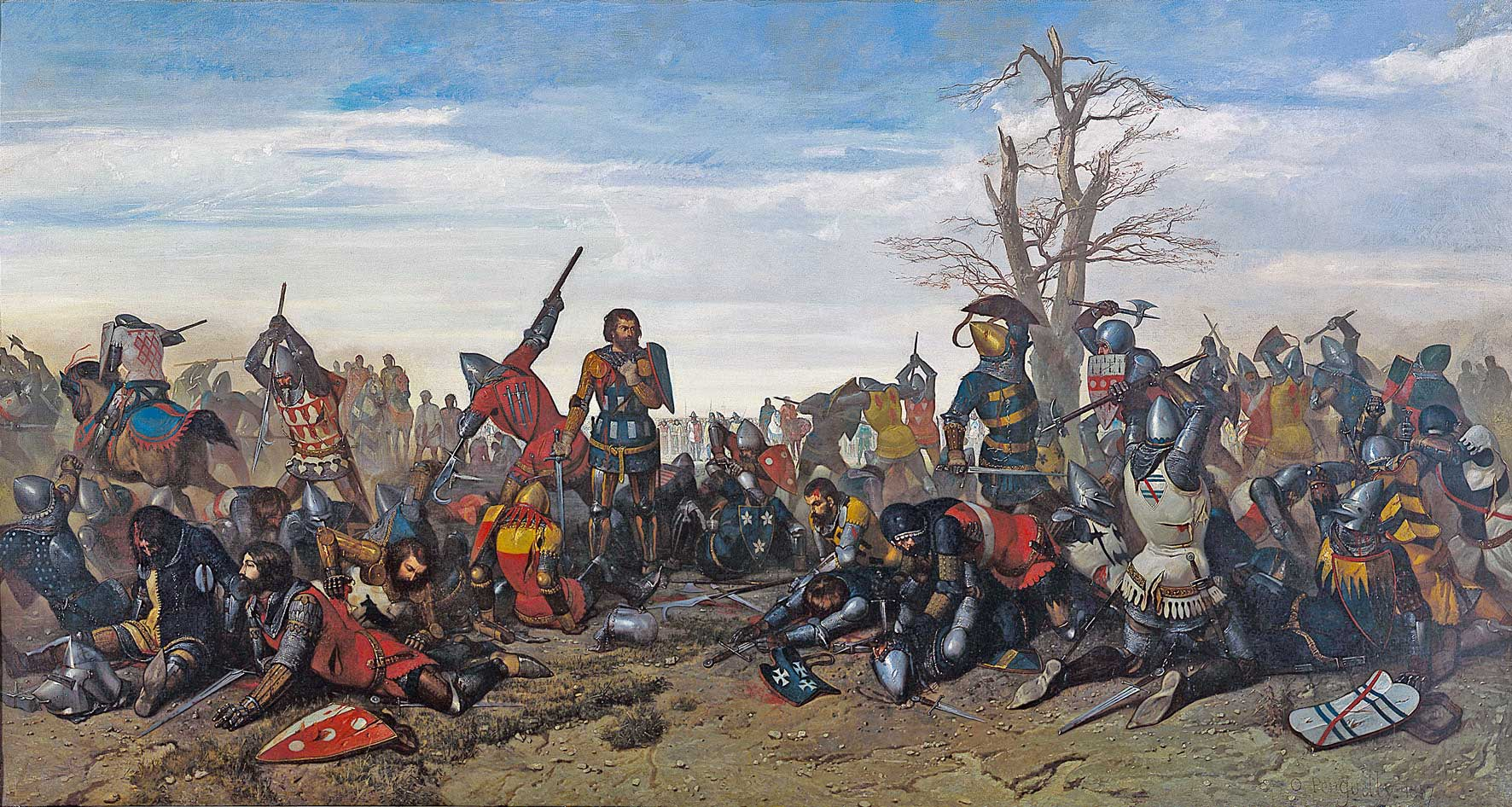
The Combat of the Thirty by Octave Penguilly L'Haridon

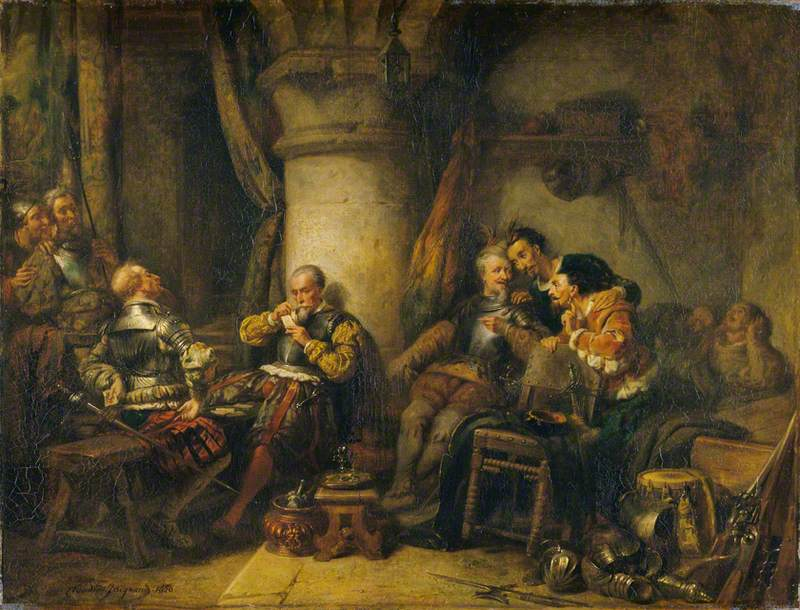
Guard Room Scene by Claude Jacquand

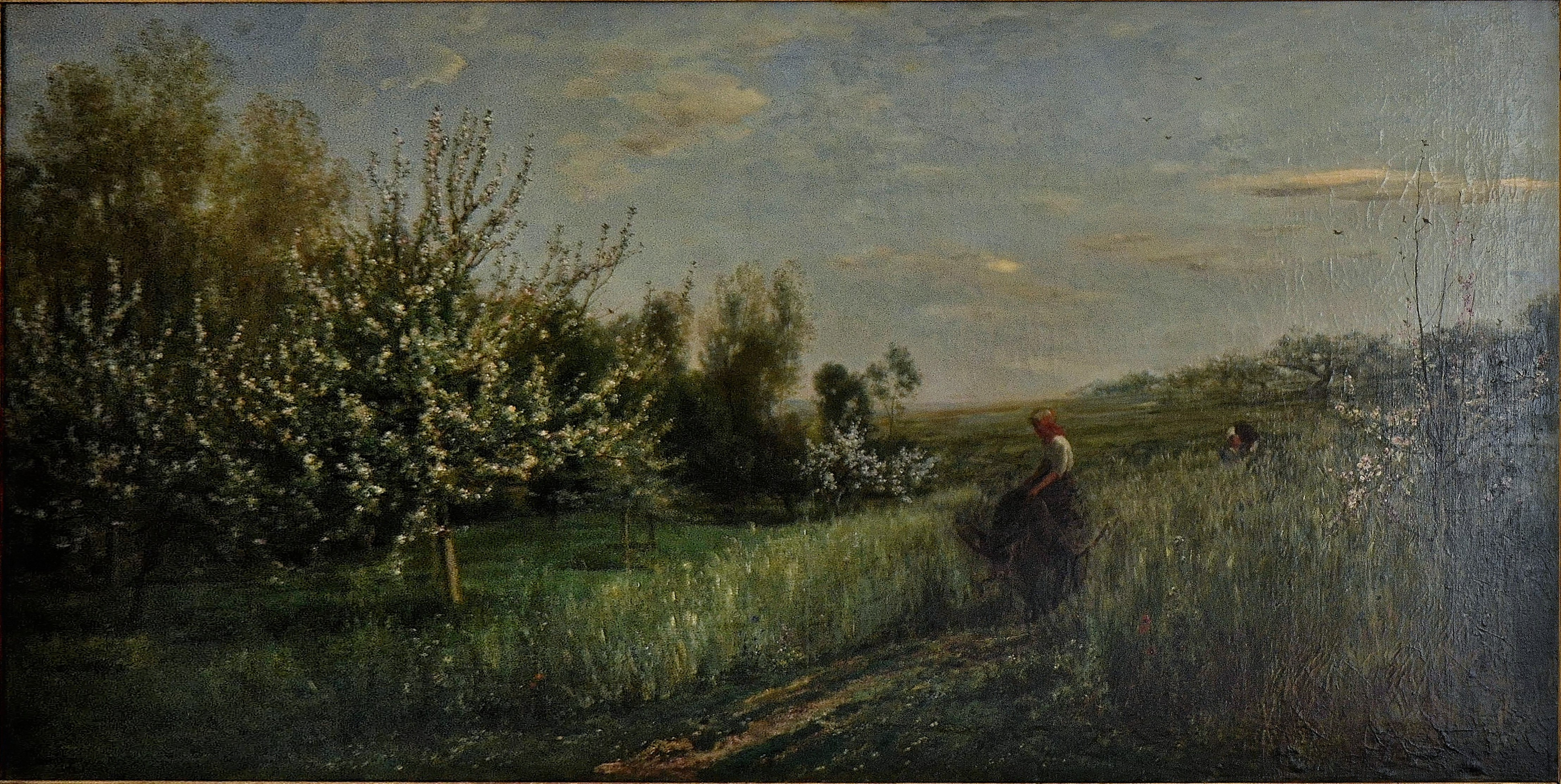
Spring by Charles-François Daubigny

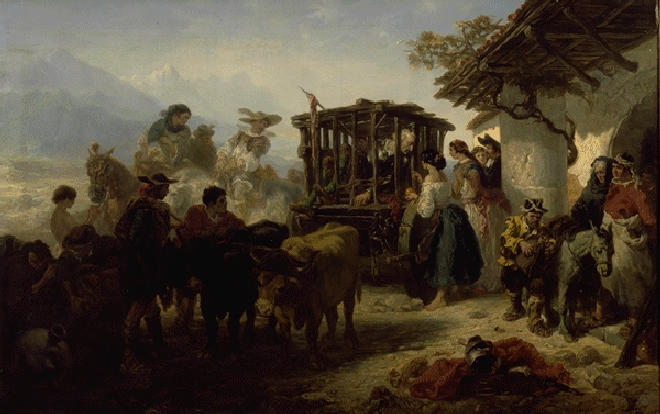
Don Quixote in a Cage by Celestin Nanteuil

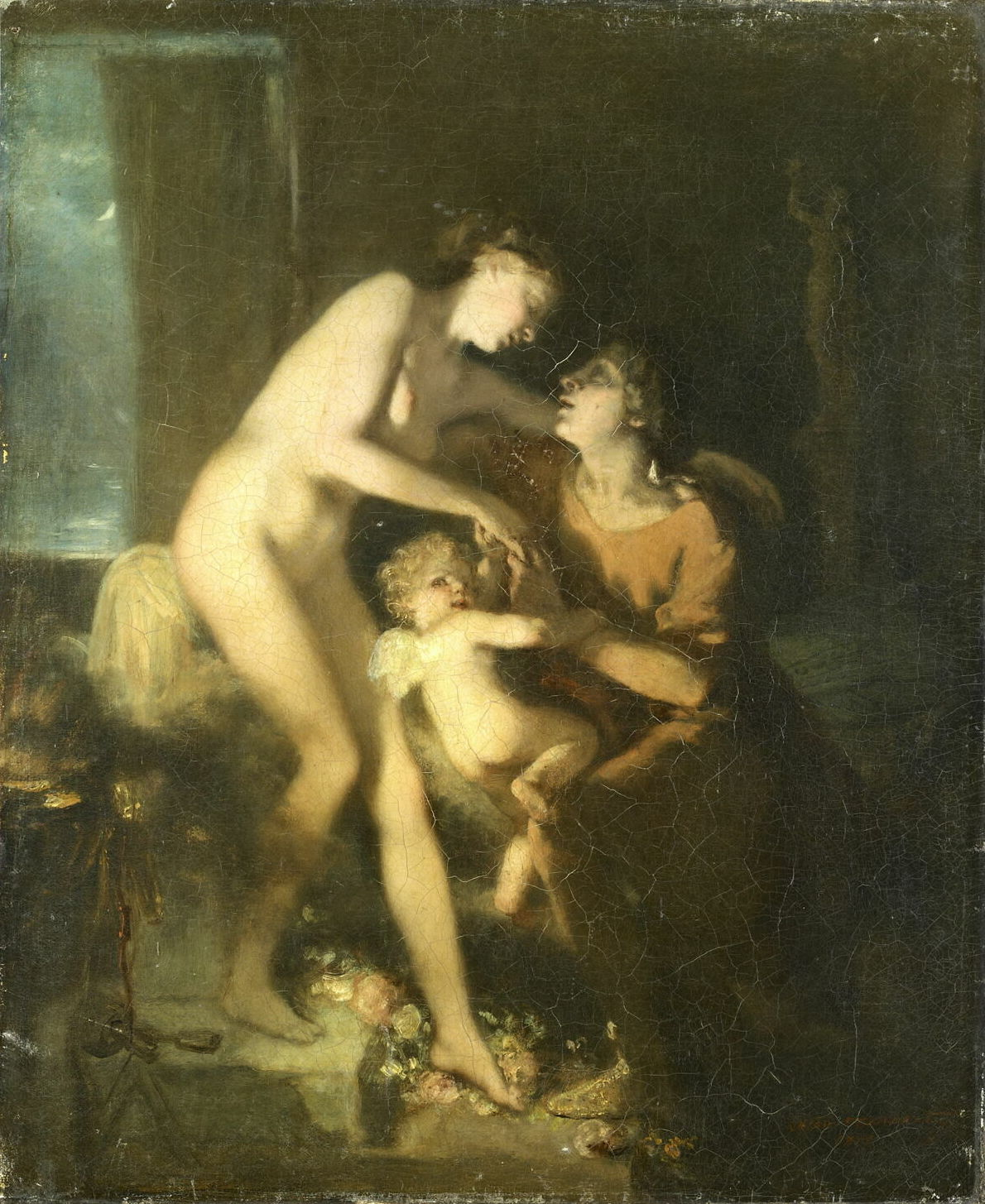
Pygmalion and Galatea by Octave Tassaert

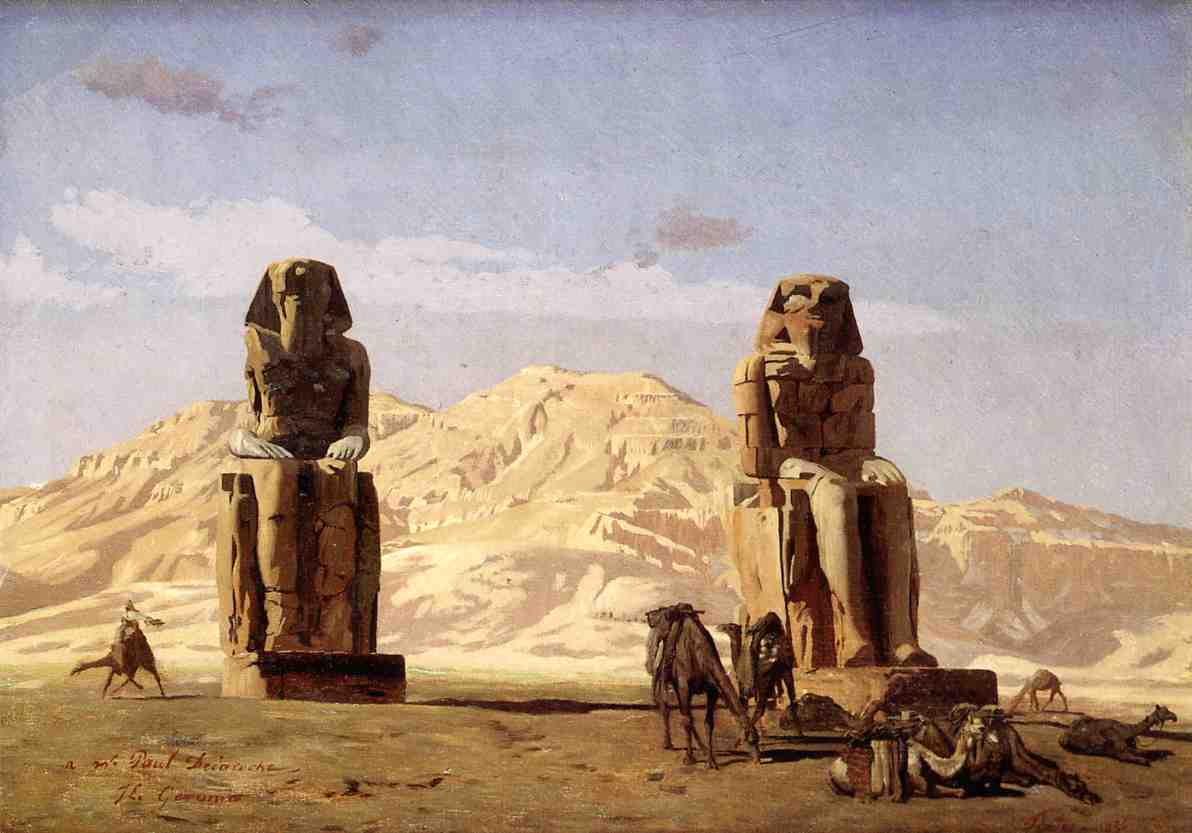
Memnon and Sesostris by Jean-Léon Gérôme

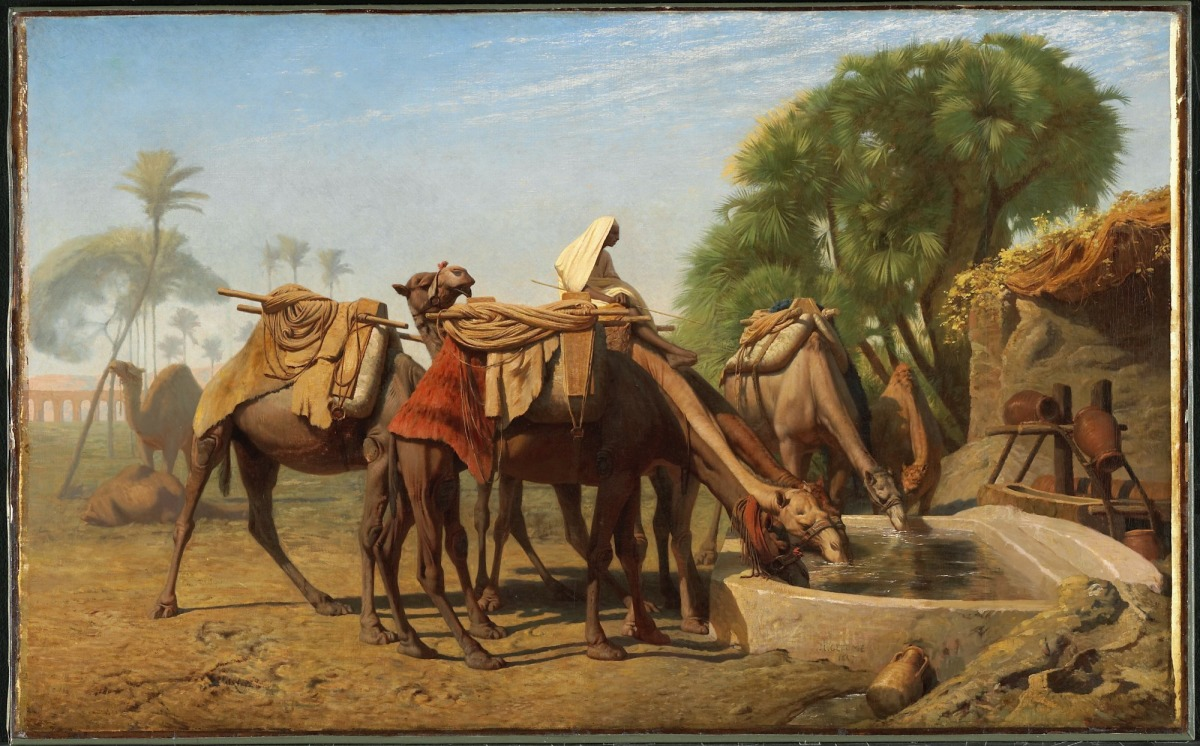
Camels Watering by Jean-Léon Gérôme

Louis XIV Receiving the Louis, Grand Condé after the Battle of Seneffe by Charles Doerr

== See also ==
- Royal Academy Exhibition of 1857, held at the National Gallery in London
- Category:Artworks exhibited at the Salon of 1857

== Bibliography ==
- Allan, Scott & Morton, Mary G. Reconsidering Gérôme. Getty Publications, 2010.
- Hornstein, Katie. Picturing War in France, 1792–1856. Yale University Press, 2018.
- Mainardi, Patricia. Art and Politics of the Second Empire: The Universal Expositions of 1855 and 1867. Yale University Press, 1987.
- Romberg, Marion. Empresses and Queens in the Courtly Public Sphere from the 17th to the 20th Century. BRILL, 2022.
- Thoma, Julia. The Final Spectacle: Military Painting under the Second Empire, 1855-1867. Walter de Gruyter, 2019.
- Tinterow, Gary. Corot. Metropolitan Museum of Art, 1996.
