= The Congress of Paris =

Painting by Édouard Dubufe

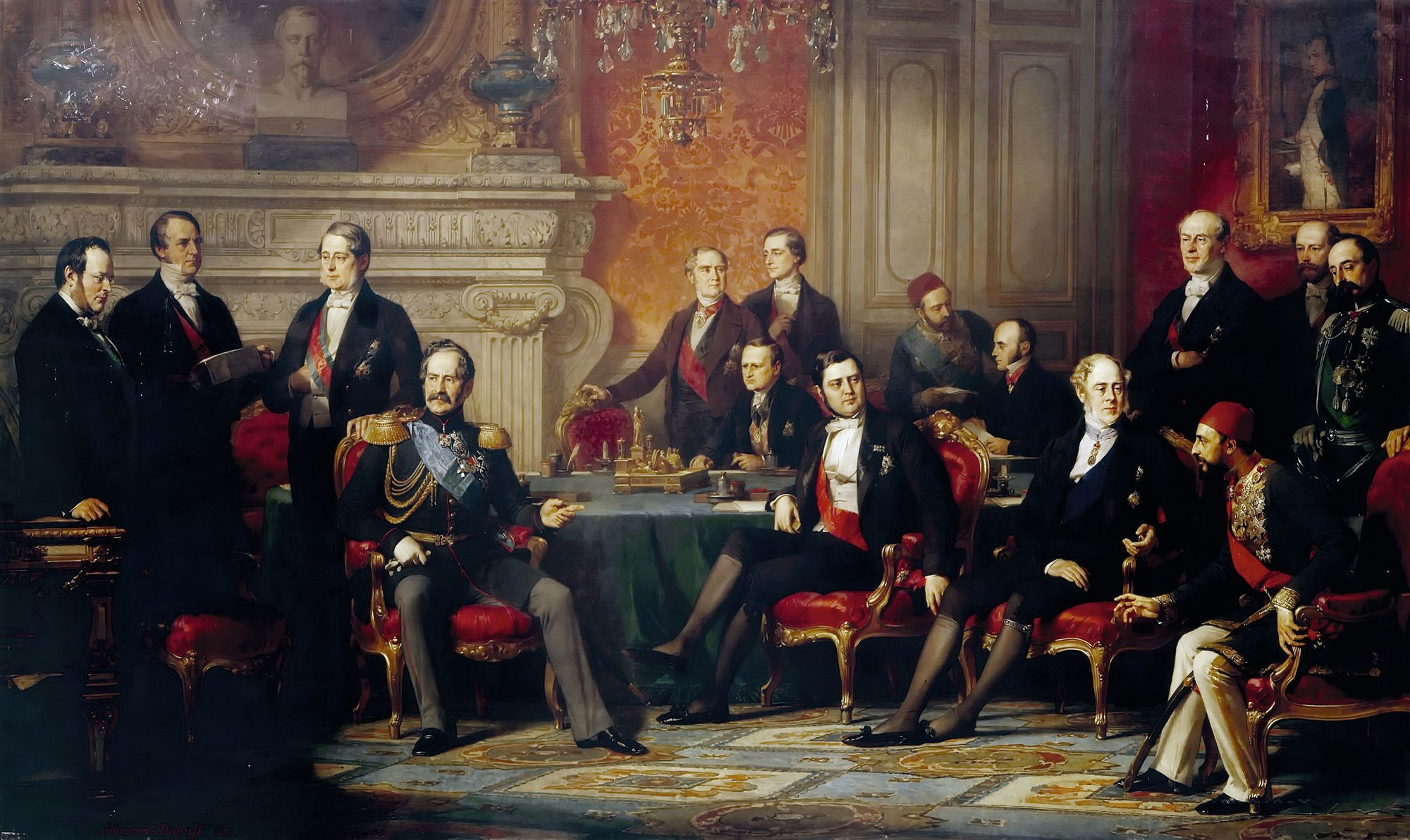
- Artist: Édouard Dubufe
- Year: 1856
- Type: Oil on canvas, history painting
- Dimensions: 311 cm × 511 cm (122 in × 201 in)
- Location: Palace of Versailles; Paris

The Congress of Paris (French: Le Congrès de Paris) is an 1856 history painting by the French artist Édouard Dubufe. It depicts the international diplomats who assembled for the Congress of Paris that ended the Crimean War. It was exhibited at the Salon of 1857. Today it is on display in the Palace of Versailles. An engraving of the painting is in the Royal Collection.

Amongst those depicted in the painting are the Count of Cavour, Lord Cowley, Alexey Fyodorovich Orlov, Mehmed Emin Âli Pasha, Count von Buol, Earl of Clarendon. Napoleon III is depicted by a bust on the left. Napoleon I, the uncle of the current French emperor, is portrayed in a painting on the right of the scene.

== Bibliography ==
- Starcky, Emmanuel. Napoléon III et les principautés roumaines: Musée d'art national de Roumanie, Bucarest, 24 octobre 2008-1er février 2009; Musée national du château de Compiègne, 21 mars-29 juin 2009. Musée national du château de Compiègne, 2008.
- Thoma, Julia. The Final Spectacle: Military Painting under the Second Empire, 1855-1867. Walter de Gruyter, 2019.
- Tucker, Judith E. The Making of the Modern Mediterranean: Views from the South. University of California Press, 2019.
