= Portrait of Pierre Bosquet =

Painting by Horace Vernet

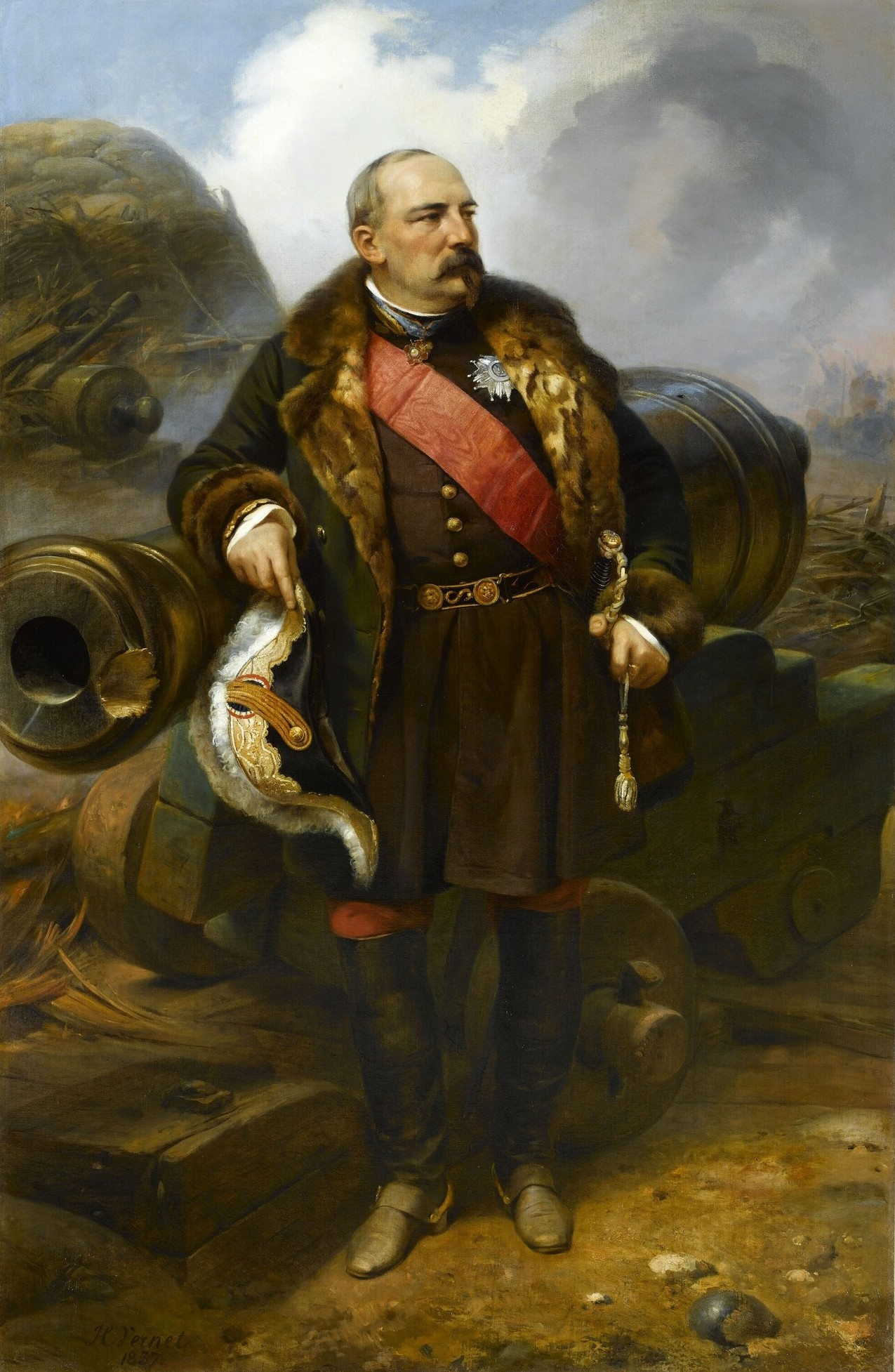
- Artist: Horace Vernet
- Year: 1857
- Type: Oil on canvas, portrait painting
- Dimensions: 215 cm × 140 cm (85 in × 55 in)
- Location: Palace of Versailles, Versailles

Portrait of Pierre Bosquet is an 1857 portrait painting by the French artist Horace Vernet. It depicts the general and politician Pierre Bosquet. A leading figure of the Second Empire, he was made a Marshal of France by Napoleon III in 1856. Bosquet was noted for his service during the French conquest of Algeria and later during the Crimean War. At the Battle of the Alma, his division was able to outflank the Russian Army. This large painting makes reference to his service in the Crimean showing him at full length, wearing the Legion of Honour and resting against a cannon. By the time the painting was produced, Bosquet had become a celebrated national hero.

Under Napoleon III, the French state commissioned a number of paintings featuring military scenes and figures, similar to those produced during the Napoleonic Wars under the reign of his uncle Napoleon. This work was displayed at the Salon of 1857, held at the Palace of Industry in Paris. Today it is in the collection of the Museum of French History at the Palace of Versailles.

== See also ==
- Portrait of Marshal MacMahon, an 1860 portrait by Vernet of Bosquet's fellow general

== Bibliography ==
- Harkett, Daniel & Hornstein, Katie (ed.) Horace Vernet and the Thresholds of Nineteenth-Century Visual Culture. Dartmouth College Press, 2017.
- Hornstein, Katie. Picturing War in France, 1792–1856. Yale University Press, 2018.
- Thoma, Julia. The Final Spectacle: Military Painting under the Second Empire, 1855-1867. Walter de Gruyter, 2019.
