= The Quarry (painting) =

Painting by Gustave Courbet

- La Curée (French)
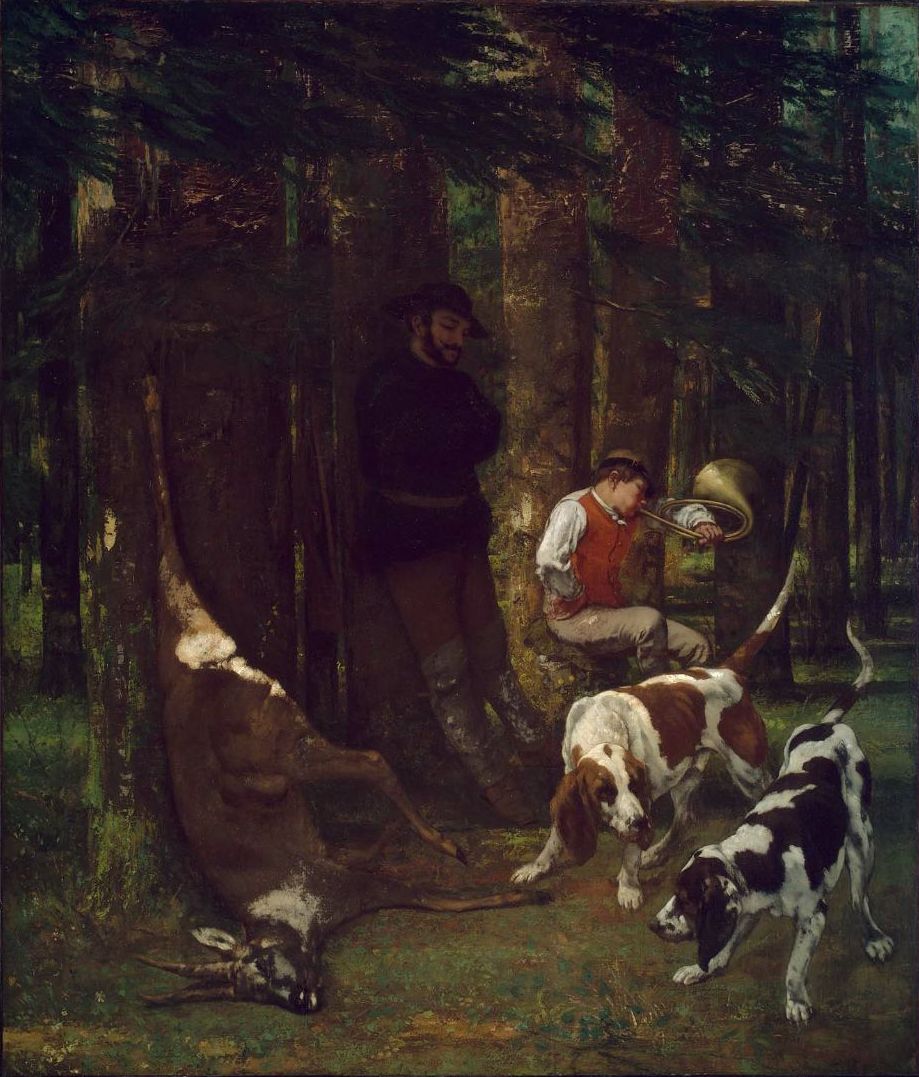
- Artist: Gustave Courbet
- Year: 1857
- Type: Oil on canvas
- Dimensions: 210.2 cm × 183.5 cm (82.8 in × 72.2 in)
- Location: Museum of Fine Arts, Boston, Boston

The Quarry: Deer Hunt in the Forests of the Grand Jura (French: La curée: Chasse au chevreuil dans les forêts du Grand Jura) is an 1857 oil painting by the French artist Gustave Courbet. It was his first work on a hunting theme and is now in the Museum of Fine Arts, Boston.

== Description ==
The painting depicts the aftermath of a hunt. On the left, two hunting dogs approach a dead roe deer that has been hung from a pine tree by its hind leg, about to eat its quarry as is tradition after a French venery hunt. One has already begun to lap up the deer's blood, and may be trying to keep the other away. Behind them, in the painting's middle, a bearded man in a hat (a self-portrait of Courbet) leans against a second tree alongside his rifle, his arms crossed, smoking a pipe. Behind him, on the painting's right, the young piqueur (master of hounds), dressed in red, sits on a treestump blowing his horn.

== History ==
Courbet was an avid hunter in his native Franche-Comté. The Quarry, set in that regions's Jura Mountains, was the first of many works in which he depicted hunting. He constructed the painting through a series of successive additions: first the deer and the hunter, then the young man and the dogs, and then background areas on additional pieces of canvas.

The painting, 2.1 meters tall by 1.8 meters wide, was first displayed at the Salon of 1857 in June 1857. Célestin Nanteuil's lithograph of the work, cropped of the area above the hunter's head, appeared in L'Artiste in July 1858.

Art dealers van Isachers and Jules Luquet bought the painting in Anvers in 1858 for 8,000 francs, and sold it in turn to the Allston Club in Boston in 1866, making it the first Courbet work to travel to the United States. After several more transactions, The Quarry became part of the collection of Boston's Museum of Fine Arts in 1918.

== Analysis and reception ==
Théophile Gautier wrote in L'Artiste about the painting's initial showing:

With no other master will you find a still-life of a more marvelous execution. The face, a humid and polished black; the eyes with deep tearpits; the frontal protuberances; the hair, thick, short, feltlike, speckled with cowlicks, shimmering with shadows; and the anatomy of the beast at once relaxed and stiffened with death are rendered with an incomparable realism, forcefulness, and size.

While The Quarry was better-received than Young Ladies Beside the Seine (Summer), which debuted at the same salon, critics questioned its darkness and the lack of action despite the setting. Armand Barthet wrote:

His figures disturb me. One is arched against a pine tree, smoking his pipe with his back turned to the scene that should interest him. He sleeps gently in an indifference that I hardly understand at the moment of a curie chaude. The other, his cheeks puffed out in an effort to play an impossible fanfare, sleeps like his master, to whom he also turns his back.

Shao-Chien Tseng, writing in The Art Bulletin in 2008, interprets the inertness differently from Barthet and other contemporaries of Courbet's:

The hornsman, who ought to blow a fanfare to announce the desired conclusion and increase the excitement, seems instead to sound a dirge for the repose of the dead. The hounds, having received no signal to proceed with their anticipated devouring of the entrails, appear strangely hesitant and restrained.

Fried categorizes The Quarry, alongside The Wheat Sifters and The Painter's Studio, as a "real allegory", part of "a remarkable sustained meditation on the nature of pictorial realism" despite not itself being about painting. The hunter, being a self-portrait of Courbet, represents the painter or "beholder" to Fried, while the piqueur represents the activity of painting and the effort involved in it. Fried notes that the latter's posture is similar to that of a painter and that his red vest is the same color as Courbet's signature on The Quarry and most other paintings.
