= Portrait of Marshal Canrobert =

Painting by Horace Vernet

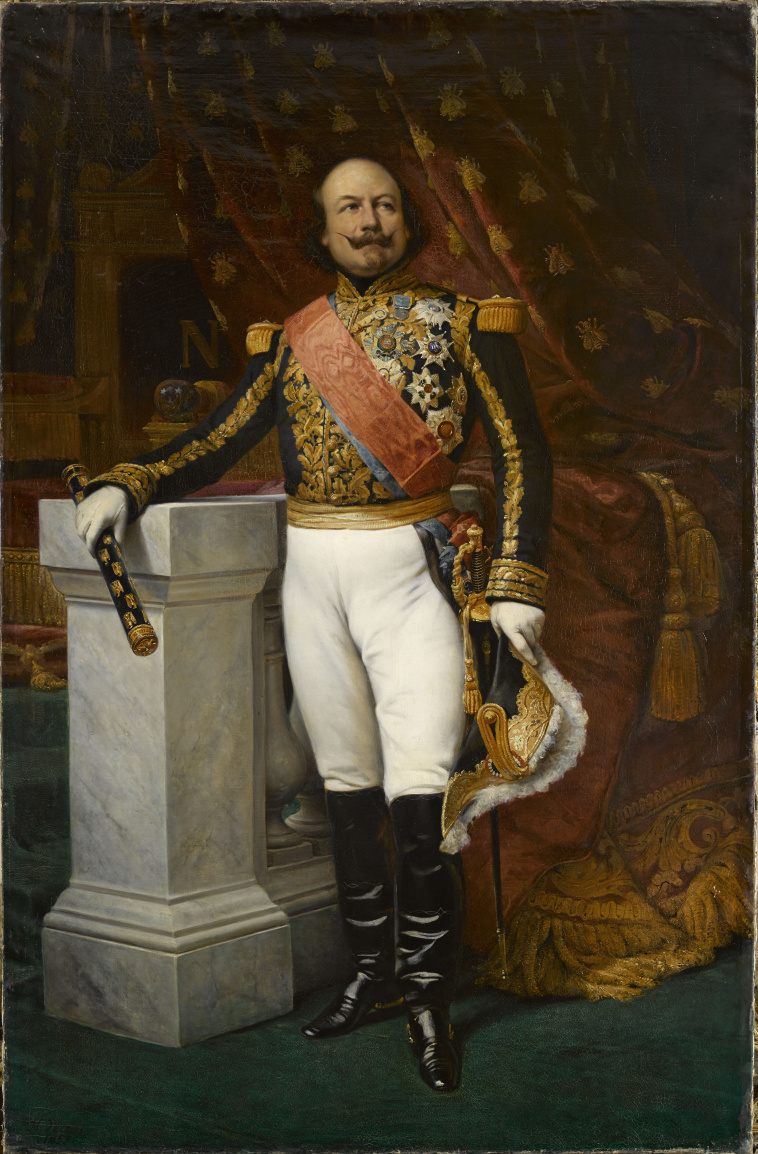
- Artist: Horace Vernet
- Year: 1857
- Type: Oil on canvas, portrait painting
- Dimensions: 219 cm × 143 cm (86 in × 56 in)
- Location: Palace of Versailles; Versailles

Portrait of Marshal Canrobert is an 1857 portrait painting by the French artist Horace Vernet. It features the French general François Certain de Canrobert. A noted commander during the Crimean War, he later fought at the Battle of Magenta and was raised to the rank of Marshal of France by Napoleon III.

It was one of a series of paintings commissioned during the Second French Empire by Napoleon III which attempt to emulate the glory of the reign of his uncle Napoleon I and his Marshals of the Empire. It was displayed at the Salon of 1857 in Paris and is now in the Museum of French History at the Palace of Versailles.

== Bibliography ==
- Bianco, Odile. Napoléon: La collection napoléonienne de la Cité Impériale. Musée Fesch, 2005.
- Harkett, Daniel & Hornstein, Katie (ed.) Horace Vernet and the Thresholds of Nineteenth-Century Visual Culture. Dartmouth College Press, 2017.
- Hornstein, Katie. Picturing War in France, 1792–1856. Yale University Press, 2018.
- Thoma, Julia. The Final Spectacle: Military Painting under the Second Empire, 1855-1867. Walter de Gruyter, 2019.
