= Egyptian Recruits Crossing the Desert =

Painting by Jean-Léon Gérôme

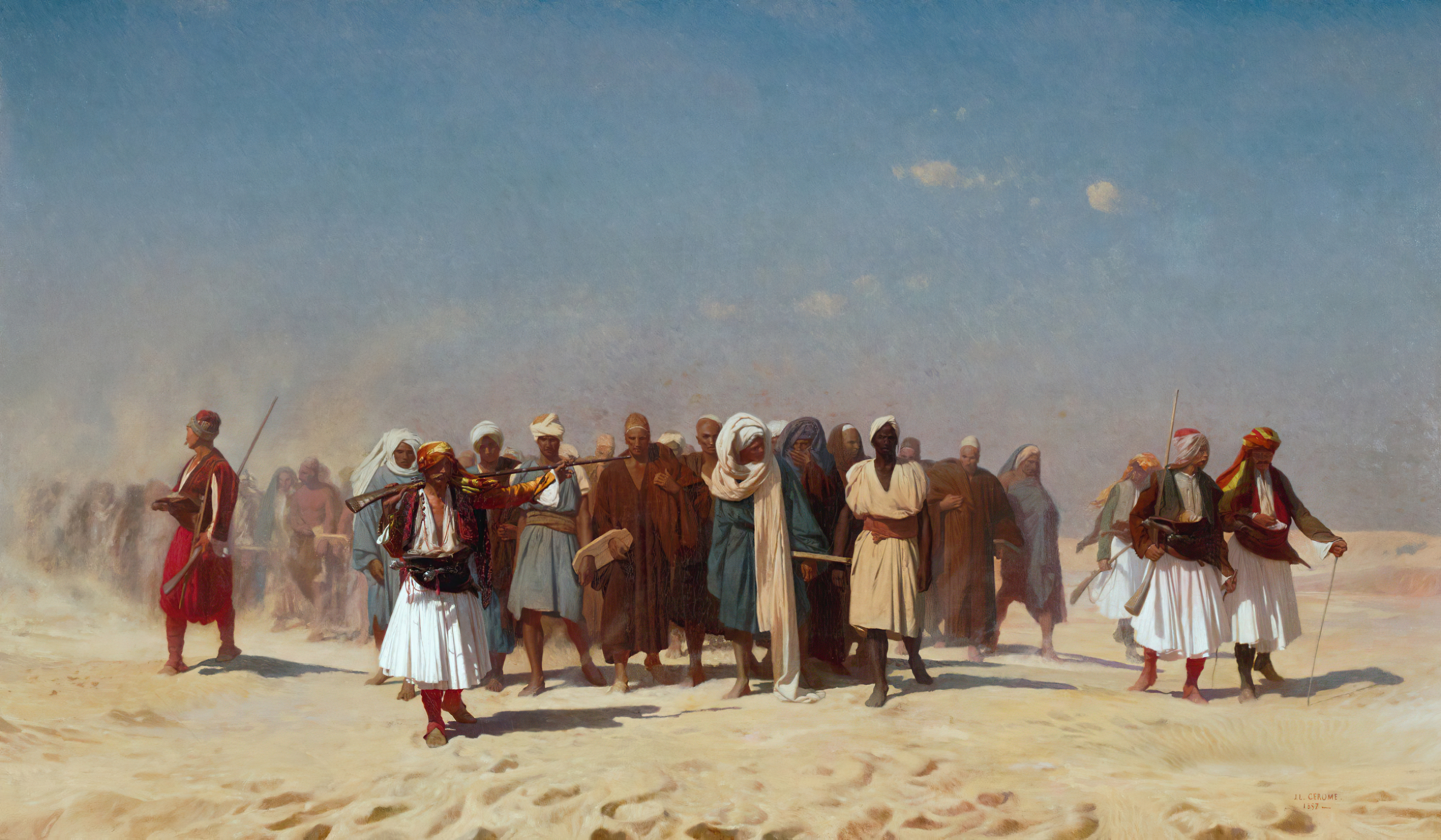
- Artist: Jean-Léon Gérôme
- Year: 1857
- Type: Oil on panel, genre painting
- Dimensions: 62 cm × 106 cm (24 in × 42 in)
- Location: Private collection

Egyptian Recruits Crossing the Desert (French: Recrues égyptiennes traversant le désert) is an 1857 oil painting by the French artist Jean-Léon Gérôme. A genre painting of the fashionable Orientalist style, it depicts a group of recruits of the Egyptian Army being escorted through the desert. Drawn from conscripted fellaheen, they are shown as a sandstorm approaches.

Gérôme had visited Egypt the previous year. The painting was displayed at the Salon of 1857 held in the Palace of Industry in Paris. It was auctioned at Sotheby's in 2021.

== Bibliography ==
- Allan, Scott & Morton, Mary G. Reconsidering Gérôme. Getty Publications, 2010.
- Lafont-Couturier, Hélène. Gérôme and Goupil. Réunion des musées nationaux, 2000.
- Weinberg, Helene Barbara. The American Pupils of Jean-Léon Gérôme. Amon Carter Museum, 1984.
