= La Danse (Bouguereau) =

1856 painting by William-Adolphe Bouguereau

- The Dance (English)
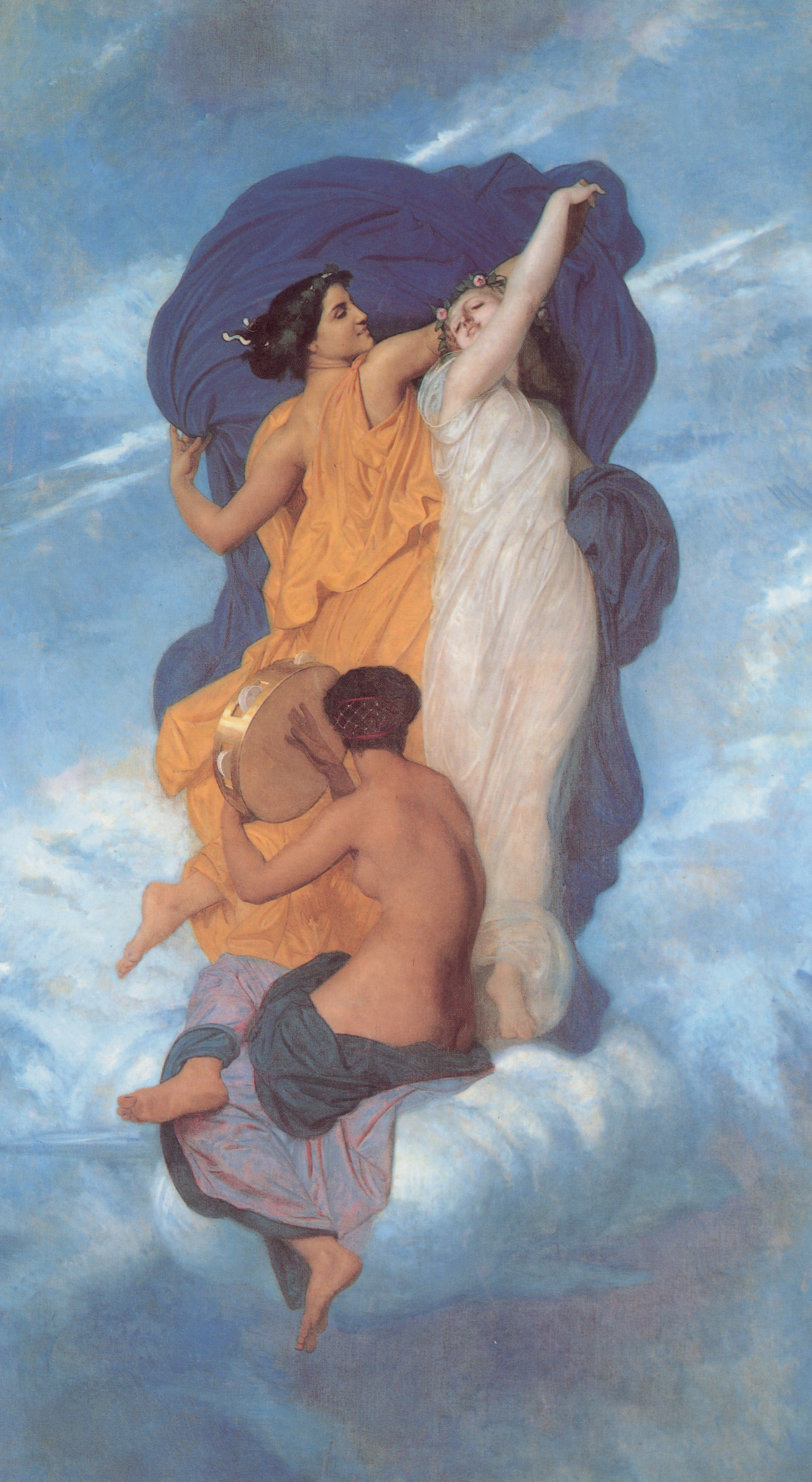
- La Danse (1856)
- Artist: William-Adolphe Bouguereau
- Year: 1856
- Medium: Oil on canvas
- Dimensions: 367 cm × 180 cm (144 in × 71 in)
- Location: Musée d'Orsay; Paris

La Danse (English: The Dance) is an oil-on-canvas painting created by the French artist William-Adolphe Bouguereau in 1856. The painting is currently held in the Musée d'Orsay in Paris.

The work, commissioned in 1855 by Anatole Bartholoni to decorate a living room at his Paris hotel, represents dance in an allegorical manner. Other canvases in the set are held at the United States Embassy in Paris. It was exhibited at the Salon of 1857.

The canvas was donated by Captain Peter Moore to the National Museums for the Musée d'Orsay in 1981. It was then attributed to the Musée du Louvre, which finally assigned it to the Musée d'Orsay the same year.

== See also ==
- William-Adolphe Bouguereau gallery
