= A Painter (Meissonier) =

Painting by Ernest Meissonier

- Artist: Ernest Meissonier
- Year: 1855
- Medium: Oil on mahogany
- Dimensions: 27 cm × 21.1 cm (11 in × 8.3 in)
- Location: Cleveland Museum of Art, Cleveland

A Painter (French: Le Peintre) is an oil on mahogany painting by the French painter Ernest Meissonier, created in 1855. It is held in the collection of the Cleveland Museum of Art.

== History and description ==
Meissonier was fond of creating paintings representing artists and musicians of the 17th and 18th centuries. To ensure the authenticity of his paintings, Meissonier often purchased accessories at local costume fairs.

The work depicts an 18th-century painter sitting on a low chair in his studio. He appears deeply focused on painting a small canvas on an easel, depicting a mythological scene containing a nymph and a satyr. The artist holds a brush in his right hand and the remaining brushes and a palette are held in his left hand.

The artist's 18th-century clothing transforms the scene into a typical historical genre painting. The mandolin behind the easel and the bust on the wardrobe indicate that the fictional artist has an interest in music and sculpture.

Meissonier exhibited the current painting at the Salon of 1857 in Paris.

== Provenance ==
The painting was first bought by a private collector in 1861. It went through several owners until being acquired by the Cleveland Museum of Art, in 1982.
