= Congress of Paris (1856) =

Series of diplomatic meetings, 1856, to negotiate peace in the Crimean War

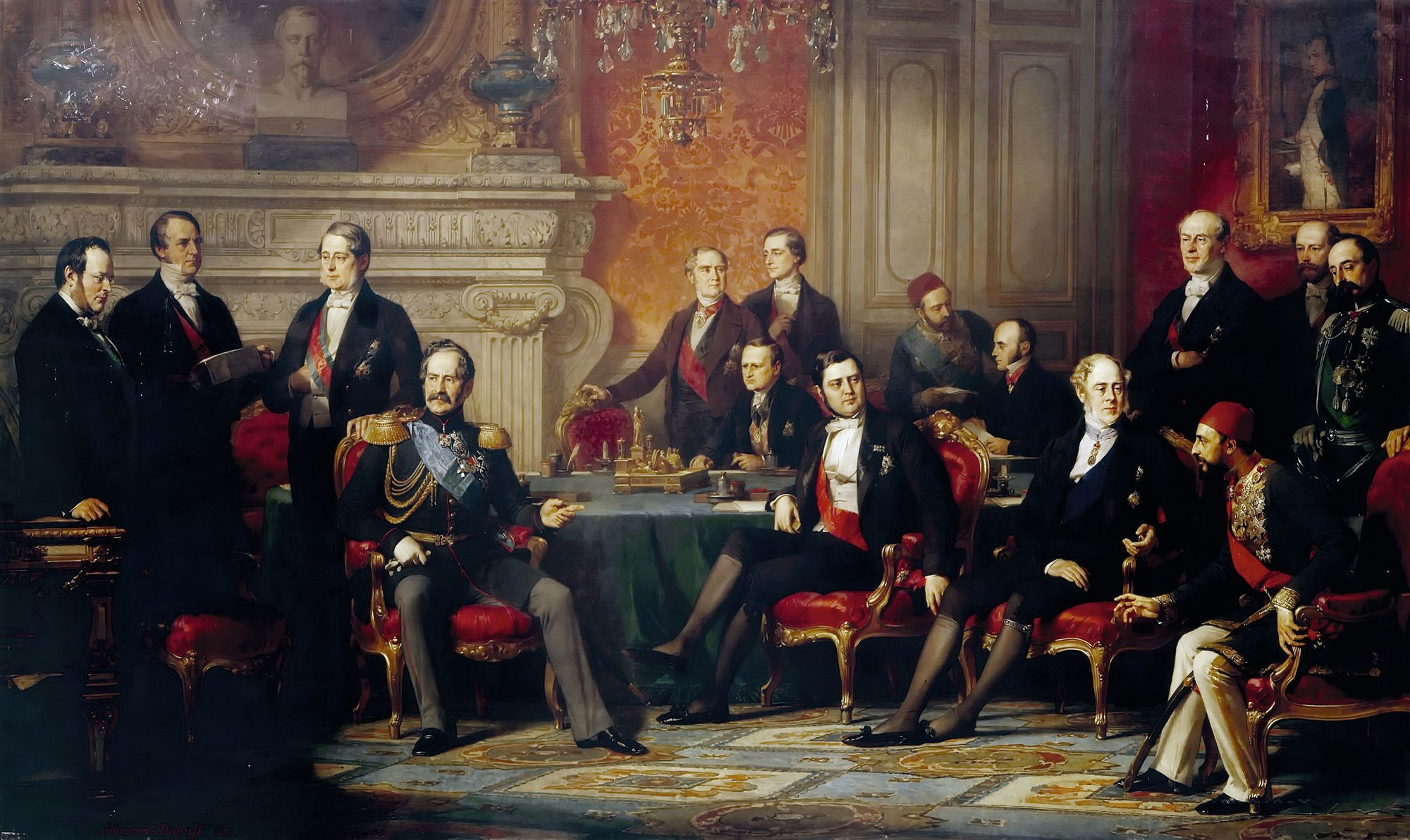
Diplomats assembled at Congress of Paris. The Congress of Paris by Edouard Dubufe

The Congress of Paris was a series of diplomatic meetings held in 1856 in Paris, France, to negotiate peace between the warring powers in the Crimean War that had started almost three years earlier.

The Congress was attended by diplomatic representatives from the nations of France, Great Britain, Russia, Austria, and Prussia, as well as from the Ottoman Empire and Piedmont-Sardinia and was presided by the French Minister of Foreign Affairs Alexandre Colonna-Walewski. The agreement resulted in continued recognition of the Ottoman Empire and the return to pre-war territorial borders for Russia and the Empire.

== Background ==
The Crimean War was fought mainly on the Crimean Peninsula by Russia on one side and Great Britain, France, the Ottoman Empire and Piedmont-Sardinia on the other side for two main official reasons.

One reason often communicated was the Russians' demand for both better treatment of and their right to protect the Ottoman Empire's Orthodox subjects. That would be promised by the sultan at the Congress of Paris.

Another reason was a dispute between the Russians and the French about the privileges of the Russian Orthodox and the Roman Catholic Churches in Palestine.

The reasons and interests playing a role in the background can be read from the following agreements negotiated in the peace treaty: the Black Sea became neutral, meaning its waters were closed to all warships and the building of fortresses was forbidden, the Danube was opened to the shipping of all nations.

Also important appeared to be a multilateral agreement on some basic legal principles of maritime warfare, resulting in the separate Paris Declaration Respecting Maritime Law, that was acceded by altogether 55 nations.

Backed by Britain and France, the sultan declared war against Russia on 4 October 1853. On 28 March 1854, both of the other powers declared war against Russia. On 26 January 1855, Piedmont-Sardinia also entered the war by sending 10,000 troops to aid Britain and France against Russia.

Throughout the war, the Russian Army's main concern was to make sure that the Austrian Empire stayed out of the war. Its threats to enter the war did put an end to military actions on the side of Russia.

== Congress ==
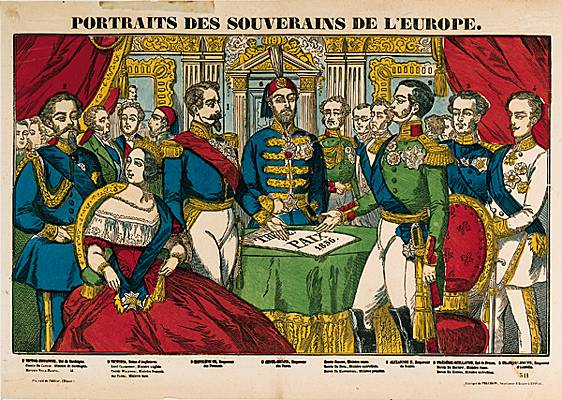
Épinal print of the sovereigns of Europe during the Congress of Paris, 1856

France, Great Britain, Russia, Austria, Prussia and the Ottoman Empire were at that time considered as the great powers in Europe, they were all represented at the congress as was Piedmont-Sardinia as warring party. They assembled soon after 1 February 1856, when Russia accepted the first set of peace terms after Austria threatened to enter the war. It is also notable that the meeting took place in Paris, after the 1855 Exposition Universelle.

The Congress of Paris worked out the final terms from 25 February to 30 March 1856, the Treaty of Paris was signed on 30 March 1856 with Russia on one side and France, Great Britain, Turkey and Piedmont-Sardinia on the other. at the Quai d'Orsay.

One of the representatives who attended the Congress of Paris on behalf of the Ottoman Empire was Mehmed Emin Âli Pasha, who was the Ottoman Empire's grand vizier. Russia was represented by Prince Orlov and Baron Brunnov. Britain sent Lord Cowley, its ambassador to France.

The Congress of Vienna (1814) with over 200 nations participating, spread questions and issues for different committees to resolve. The Congress of Paris could resolved everything in a relatively short period of time.

A significant diplomatic victory was scored by Piedmont-Sardinia although it was not considered a European great power by being granted a seat by French Emperor Napoleon III, mostly for having sent an expeditionary corps of 18,000 men to fight against Russia, but also possibly because of the influence of the attractive minded Countess of Castiglione, who had caught Napoleon's attention. Prime minister Camillo Benso di Cavour seized the opportunity to denounce Austrian political and military interference in the Italian Peninsula, which he said was stifling the wish of Italians to choose their government.

== Multilateral agreement restoring peace ==
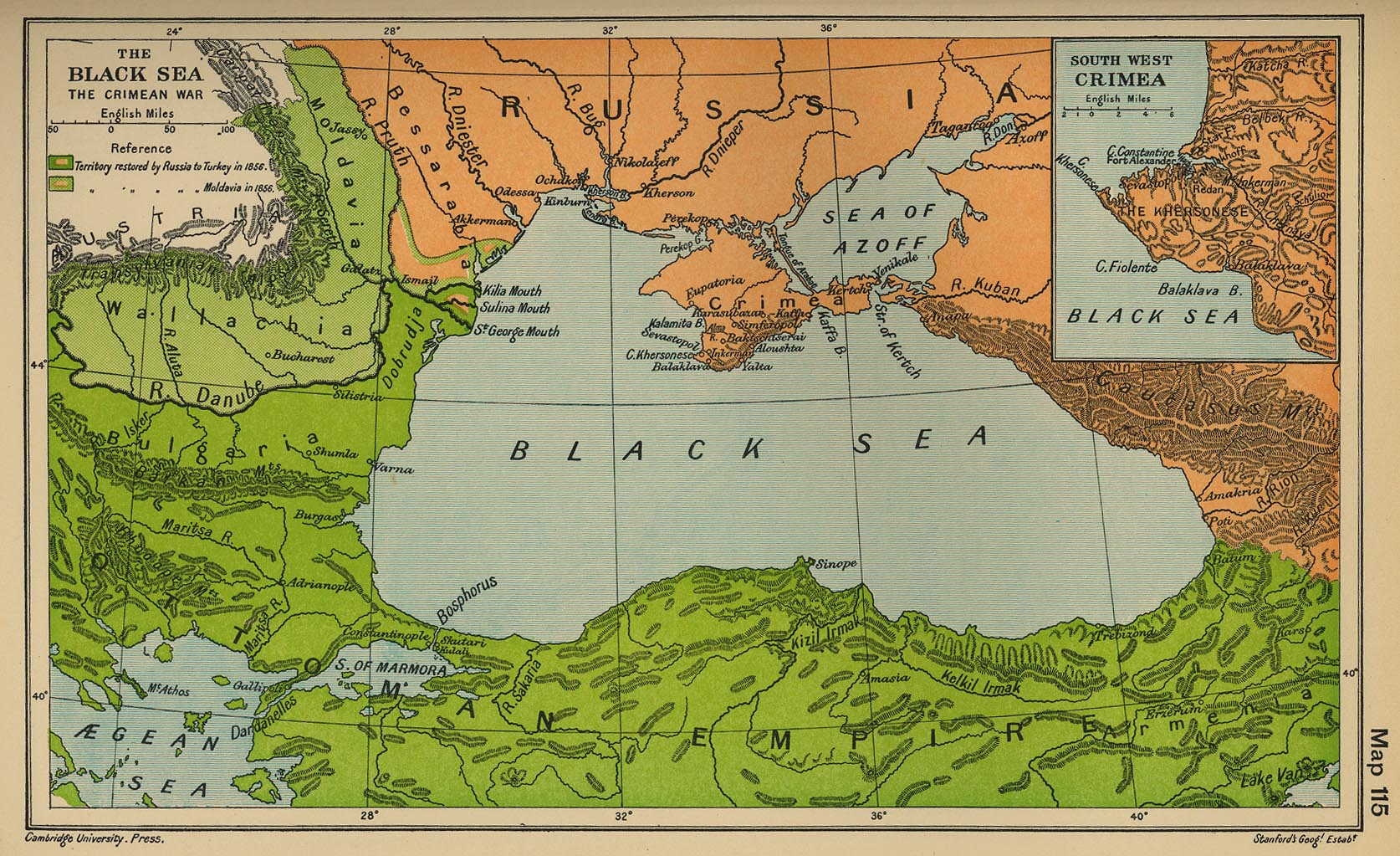
Picture of the territory affected by the Congress. In light green, to the left, is the area of the Danubian Principalities (Wallachia and Moldavia). In light green is the border of southern Bessarabia, which was transferred from Russia to Moldavia between the Danube River and Moldavia.

The Congress resulted in a pledge by all powers to jointly maintain "the integrity of the Ottoman Empire", thus guaranteeing its independence.

Also, Russia gave up the left bank of the mouth of the Danube River, including part of Bessarabia, to Moldavia, as well as its claim to the special protection of Christians in the Ottoman Empire. Moldavia and Wallachia, which together would become Romania in 1858, along with Serbia, were recognized as quasi-independent self-governing principalities under protection of the other European powers. The Ottoman sultan agreed, in return, to help to improve the status of the Christian subjects in his empire.

The territories of Russia and the Ottoman Empire were restored to their prewar boundaries. The Black Sea was neutralized and so that no warships were allowed to enter, but it was open to all other nations. It also opened the Danube River for shipping from all nations.

== Multilateral agreement on naval warfare, open for accession ==
After signing the peace treaty, the plenipotentiaries assembled in the conference also agreed on a declaration respecting maritime law during wartime. This was mainly the outcome of a modus vivendi signed between France and Britain at the dawn of the Crimean War in 1854. Both large naval powers had different opinions on certain issues in maritime warfare and being allies for the first time, they had to find a common line. They agreed they would not seize enemy goods on neutral vessels nor neutral goods on enemy vessels and they would not issue letters of marque. The Declaration all warring parties agreed upon at the Congress of Paris regulated four issues:

- Privateering is and remains abolished;
- The neutral flag covers enemy's goods, with the exception of contraband of war;
- Neutral goods, with the exception of contraband of war, are not liable to capture under the enemy's flag;
- Blockades, in order to be binding, must be effective-that is to say, maintained by a force sufficient to prevent access to the coast of the enemy.

The Declaration has been signed by Great Britain, Austria, France, Prussia, Russia, Sardinia and Turkey.

As an important juridical novelty in international law the treaty for the first time in history created the possibility for nations that were not involved in the establishment of the agreement and did not sign, to become a party by acceding the declaration afterwards. Within a short period after signing, 55 states, royal houses and free cities ratified the Declaration, which meant a big step in the globalisation of international (maritime) law.

== Aftermath ==
Turkish historians still express dissatisfaction: "Although [the] Ottoman Empire was on the side of victors, the Porte also lost the right to have a navy in the Black Sea together with Russia. Put differently, the Empire had become a part of the European Concert, but not an actor in the European balance of power. Thus it was not recognized as a great power that could claim compensation in case of territorial gain by another member of the system".

The conditions of the Paris Congress collapsed after the defeat of France in the 1870-1871 Franco-Prussian War. After the surrender of the fortress of Metz, when France lost hope of winning the war, Russia announced its refusal to comply with the terms of the treaty. Russian Foreign Minister Alexander Gorchakov denounced the treaty's Black Sea clauses on 31 October 1870, which was documented by the Treaty of London (1871).

Some of the rules and agreements would be changed by the Congress of Berlin.
