= 1848 in art =

Events from the year 1848 in art.

== Events ==
- April 10 – John Ruskin marries Effie Gray in Perth, Scotland.
- September – John Everett Millais, William Holman Hunt and Dante Gabriel Rossetti found the pre-Raphaelite Brotherhood in the former's family home in Gower Street (London).
- c. October – The first frescoes of scenes from English literature in the Poets' Hall of the Palace of Westminster are completed: Charles West Cope's Griselda's first Trial of Patience and John Callcott Horsley's Satan touched by Ithuriel's Spear while whispering evil dreams to Eve.
- December 10 – The Leipzig Art Association opens the Städtische Museum.
- In Cambridge, England, the Fitzwilliam Museum's Founder's Building (designed by George Basevi and completed by C. R. Cockerell) is opened.
- In Copenhagen, Denmark, the Thorvaldsen Museum of sculpture (designed by Michael Gottlieb Bindesbøll) is opened.
- In England, John Webb Singer establishes the Frome Art Metal Works, a foundry that becomes Morris Singer.

== Works ==
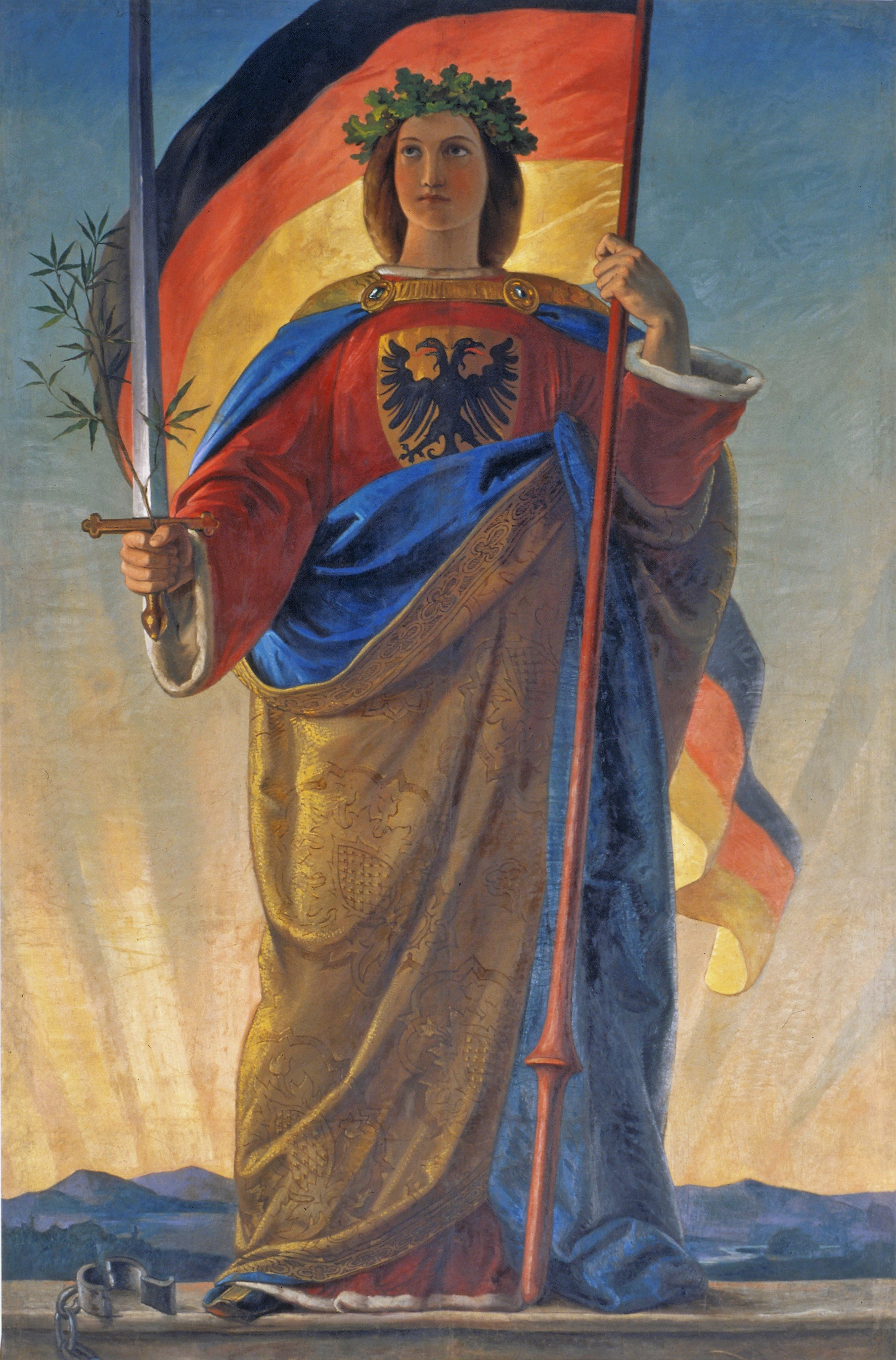
Germania, exhibited in the Frankfurt Parliament

- Ivan Aivazovsky – Battle of Chesma
- Richard Ansdell – The Fight for the Standard
- Herman Wilhelm Bissen – Den Danske Landsoldat
- William Boxall – Portrait of James McNeill Whistler
- Karl Bryullov – Self-portrait
- Edward William Cooke – Dutch Yachting on the Zuider Zee
- Auguste Couder – The Tennis Court Oath
- David Cox – Crossing the Sands
- Thomas Crawford - Mexican Girl Dying
- William Dyce – Omnia Vanitas
- Edward Hicks – The Cornell Farm
- Holman Hunt – The Flight of Madeline and Porphyro during the Drunkenness attending the Revelry, Eve of Saint Agnes
- Jean Auguste Dominique Ingres – Baronne de Rothschild
- August Kopisch – The Pontine Marshes at Sunset
- Henri Félix Emmanuel Philippoteaux – Lamartine Rejecting the Red Flag in Front of the City Hall.
- Edwin Landseer – A Random Shot
- Emanuel Leutze - The Storming of Teocalli by Cortez and his Troops
- John Everett Millais – Cymon and Iphigenia
- Jean-François Millet
  - The Winnower
  - The Captivity of the Jews in Babylon (later covered by The Young Shepherdess in 1870 due to a scarcity of materials during the Franco-Prussian War; rediscovered in 1984 by x-ray at Boston's Museum of Fine Arts)
- Samuel Palmer – The Water Mill
- Ferdinand Richardt
  - Frederiksborg Castle
  - Kronborg Castle
- David Roberts – Mont Saint Michel
- Théophile Schuler – The Chariot of Death (painting, completed in 1851)
- Clarkson Stanfield – In the Gulf of Venice
- John Evan Thomas – Death of Tewdric Mawr, King of Gwent (sculpture)
- Philipp Veit – Germania
- George Frederic Watts – Orlando Pursuing the Fata Morgana
- Richard Caton Woodville – Politics in an Oyster House

== Births ==
- January 13 – Lilla Cabot Perry, American painter (died 1933)
- February 18 – Louis Comfort Tiffany, American stained glass artist (died 1933)
- March 1 – Augustus Saint-Gaudens, American sculptor (died 1907)
- March 14 – Lise Tréhot, French art model died 1922)
- March 18 – Princess Louise, member of the British royal family and sculptor (died 1939)
- March 22 – Sarah Purser, Irish painter and stained-glass maker (died 1943)
- April 29 – Raja Ravi Varma, Indian painter (born 1906)
- June 8 – Paul Gauguin, French post-Impressionist painter (died 1903)
- August 10 – William Harnett, Irish American trompe l'oeil painter (died 1892)
- August 19 – Gustave Caillebotte, French painter and arts patron (died 1894)
- September 26 – Helen Allingham, English painter and illustrator (died 1926)
- October 3 – Henry Lerolle, French painter and arts patron (died 1929)
- date unknown
  - Giovanni Battista Amendola, Italian-born sculptor (died 1887)
  - Helen Thornycroft, English painter (died 1937)

== Deaths ==
- January 14 – Robert Adamson, Scottish pioneer photographer (born 1821)
- February 7 – Christen Købke, Danish painter (born 1810)
- February 11 – Thomas Cole, American landscape painter (born 1801)
- February 29 – Louis-François, Baron Lejeune, French general, painter and lithographer (born 1775)
- March 23 – Julien-Joseph Ducorron, Belgian landscape painter (born 1770)
- March 29 – Martinus Rørbye, Danish genre painter (born 1803)
- May 17 – Jan Frans Eliaerts, Flemish painter of animals, flowers and fruit (born 1761)
- May 30 – Antonio Basoli, Italian painter, interior designer, engraver and professor (born 1774)
- June 28 – Jean-Baptiste Debret, French painter of lithographs depicting the people of Brazil (born 1768)
- August 15 – Pyotr Sokolov, Russian aquarelle portraitist (born 1791)
- August 20 – Keisai Eisen, Japanese ukiyo-e artist (born 1790)
- November 14 – Ludwig Michael Schwanthaler, German sculptor (born 1802)
- December 13 – John Ternouth, English sculptor (born 1796)
