= Mont Saint Michel, Normandy =

Painting by Edward William Cooke

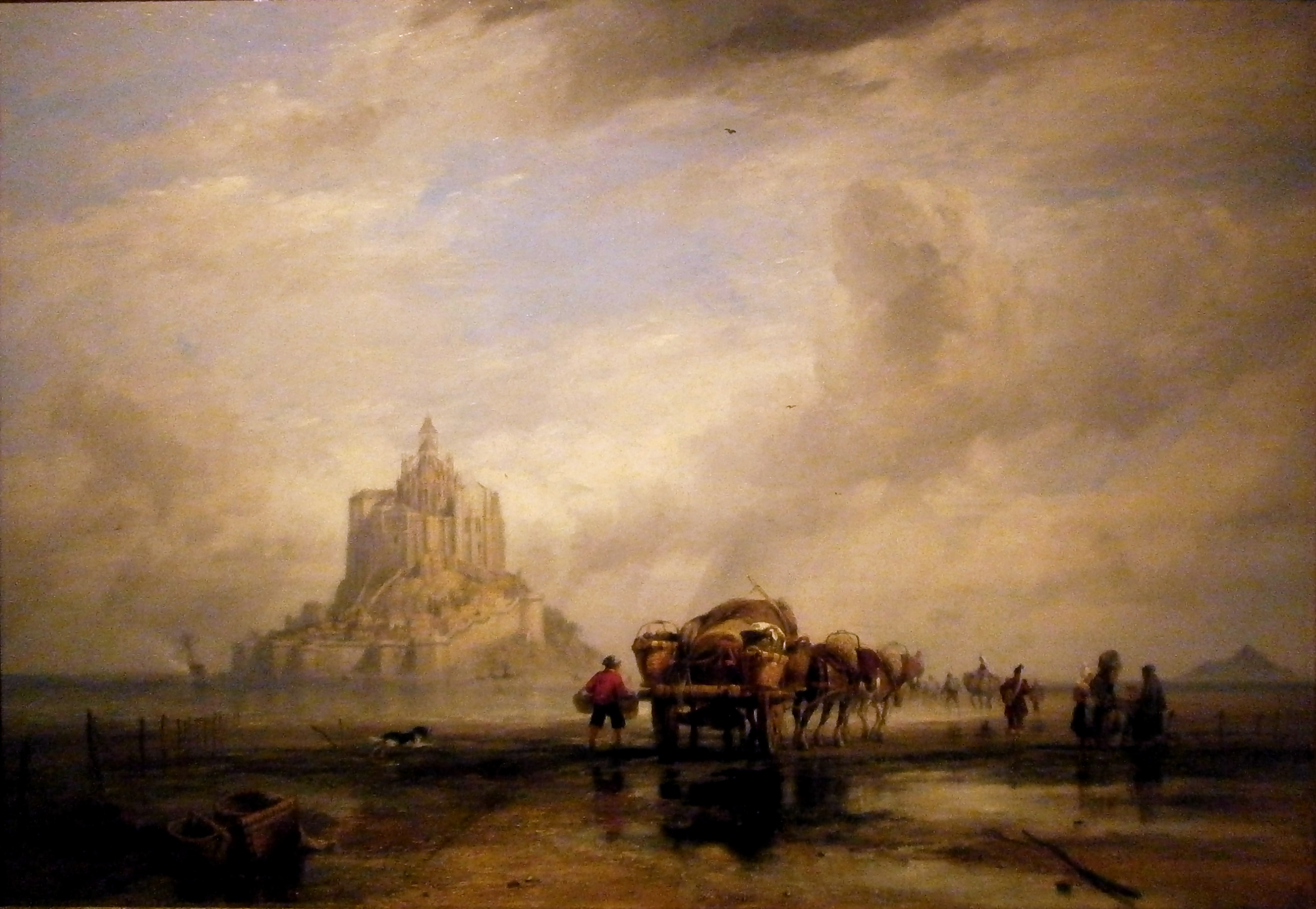
- Artist: Edward William Cooke
- Year: 1838
- Type: Oil on canvas, landscape painting
- Dimensions: 54.6 cm × 80 cm (21.5 in × 31 in)
- Location: Victoria and Albert Museum, London

Mont Saint Michel, Normandy is an oil on canvas landscape painting by the English artist Edward William Cooke, from 1838. It is held at the Victoria and Albert Museum, in London.

== History and description ==
It depicts a view of Mont-Saint-Michel, in Normandy. The towering Mount Saint-Michel is seen at the background, in the left, in the mist. Large part of canvas is occupies by the cloudy sky, near the sea. A wagon, driven by horses, and with several peasants present, occupies the foreground of the painting.

Inspired by a visit Cooke had made in 1836, this is one of as many as eight paintings that he produced depicting the view. The painting was displayed at the 1838 exhibition held by the British Institution, in Pall Mall. It was acquired by the art collector John Sheepshanks. Today it is in the collection of the Victoria and Albert Museum, having been part of the large gift of paintings he donated in 1857.

== See also ==
- Mont Saint Michel, an 1848 painting by David Roberts

== Bibliography ==
- Munday, John. Edward William Cooke: A Man of His Time. Antique Collectors' Club, 1996.
- Roe, Sonia. Oil Paintings in Public Ownership in the Victoria and Albert Museum. Public Catalogue Foundation, 2008.
