= Portrait of Isambard Kingdom Brunel =

Painting by John Callcott Horsley

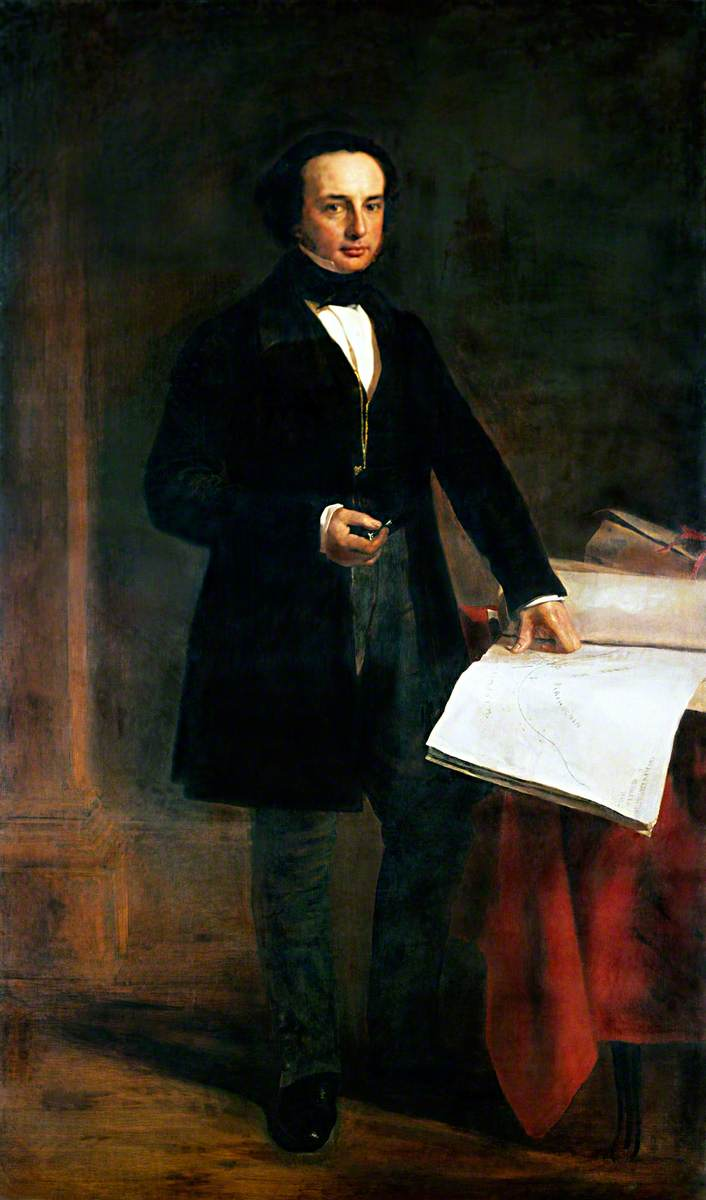
- Artist: John Callcott Horsley
- Year: 1848
- Type: Oil on canvas, portrait painting
- Dimensions: 247.5 cm × 156.2 cm (97.4 in × 61.5 in)
- Location: National Railway Museum, York

Portrait of Isambard Kingdom Brunel is an 1848 portrait painting by the British artist John Calcott Horsley. It depicts the pioneering British engineer Isambard Kingdom Brunel at full-length, his hand resting on a set of plans.

Horsley was a noted painter of the Victorian era. Through Brunel's marriage to his sister Mary Elizabeth, Horsley was brother-in-law to the engineer. The two men were close and that same year travelled together to witness the French Revolution that had broken out in Paris. Horsley also became known for developing an early Christmas Card and was later associated with the Cranbrook Group of artists. The painting was displayed at the Royal Academy Exhibition of 1848 held at the National Gallery in London. Today the picture is part of the collection of the National Railway Museum in York.

== 1857 painting ==
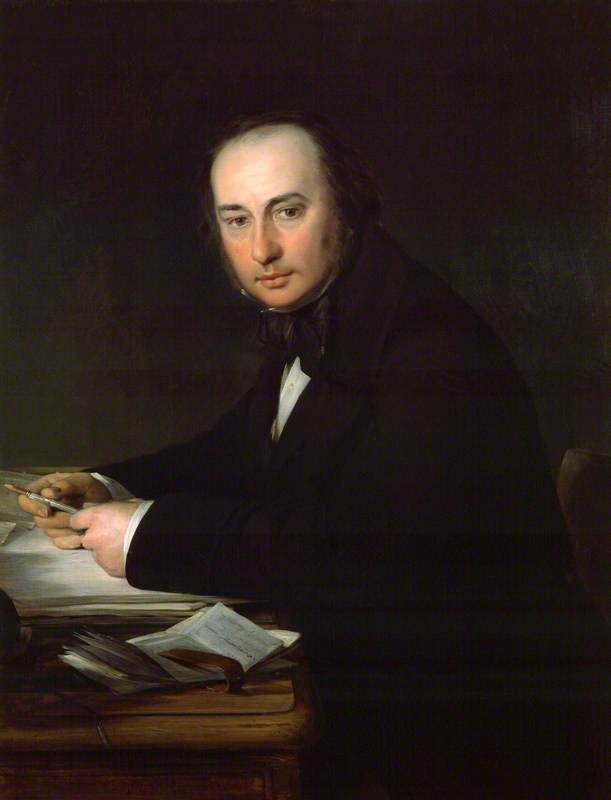
Portrait of Brunel by Horsley, 1857

Horsley also produced a separate 1857 portrait of Brunel which he displayed at the Royal Academy Exhibition of 1857 and which is now in the National Portrait Gallery.

== Bibliography ==
- Buchanan, Angus. Brunel: The Life and Times of Isambard Kingdom Brunel. Bloomsbury Publishing, 2006.
- Thompson, Carol (ed.) The Cranbrook Colony: Fresh Perspectives. Wolverhampton Art Gallery, 2010.
