= Portrait of Catherine Dickens =

1847 painting by Daniel Maclise

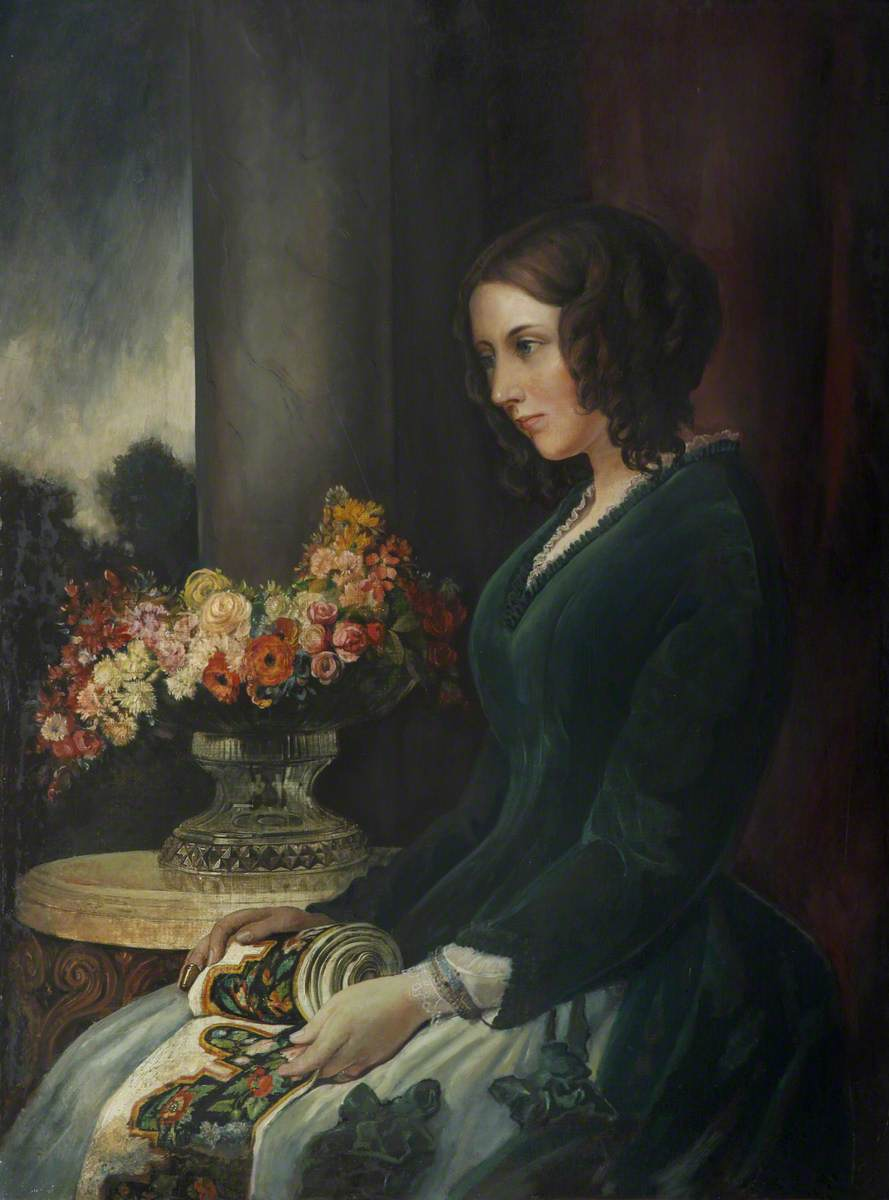
- Artist: Daniel Maclise
- Year: 1847
- Type: Oil on canvas, portrait painting
- Dimensions: 91.4 cm × 70.5 cm (36.0 in × 27.8 in)
- Location: Charles Dickens Museum; London

Portrait of Catherine Dickens is an 1847 portrait painting by the Irish artist Daniel Maclise. It depicts the author Catherine Dickens, best known for her marriage to Charles Dickens.

Known for his history paintings and genre sceness, Maclise was a friend of Catherine and her husband. The painting was displayed at the Royal Academy Exhibition of 1848 at the National Gallery. After some years in the United States the painting was acquired by the Charles Dickens Museum. After doubts were raised about the authenticity, expert analysis revealed if was a genuine painting by Maclise but has been subjected to significant overpainting likely when it was in America.

== Bibliography ==
- Douglas-Fairhurst, Robert. The Turning Point: A Year that Changed Dickens and the World. Random House, 2021.
- Nayder, Lillian. The Other Dickens: A Life of Catherine Hogarth. Cornell University Press, 2012.
- Weston, Nancy. Daniel Maclise: Irish Artist in Victorian London. Four Courts Press, 2001.
