= Portrait of Lady Holland =

Painting by George Frederic Watts

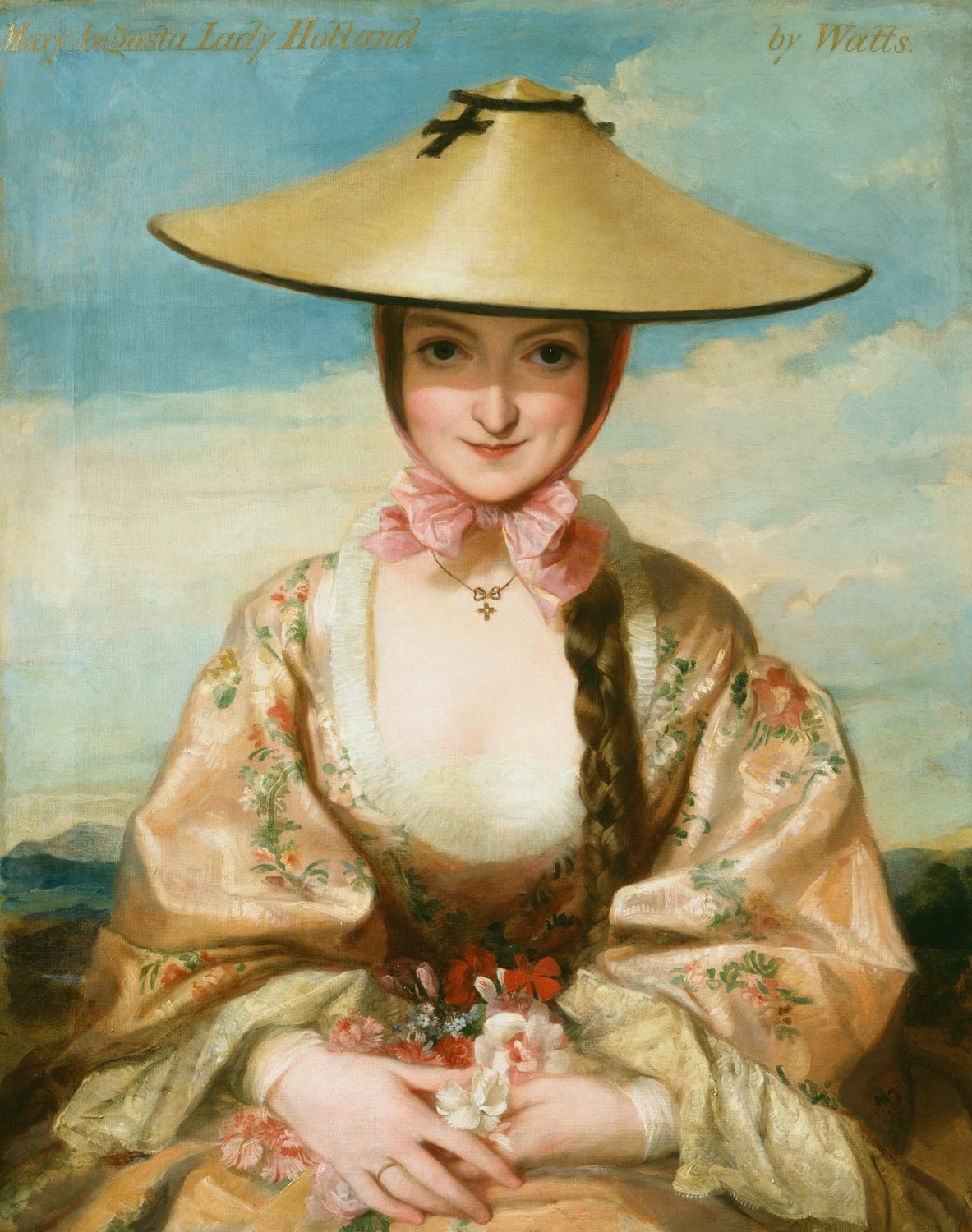
- Artist: George Frederic Watts
- Year: 1843-44
- Type: Oil on canvas, portrait painting
- Dimensions: 80.7 cm × 63.7 cm (31.8 in × 25.1 in)
- Location: Osborne House, Isle of Wight

Portrait of Lady Holland is an 1844 portrait painting by the British artist George Frederic Watts. It depicts the English aristocrat Augusta Fox, Baroness Holland. She was the wife of the Henry Fox, 4th Baron Holland, a former Whigs politician and diplomat who was the serving as British Ambassador to Tuscany.

Lady Holland is shown seated at half-length in a salmon-coloured dress with and a wide-brimmed straw hat. It was painted while Watts was staying with the couple in Florence at the Casa Feroni, the British Legation in the city. He began work in October 1843. The painting draws inspiration from the The Straw Hat by Peter Paul Rubens. The picture was displayed at the Royal Academy Exhibition of 1848 held at the National Gallery in London. It hung for a several decades at the family's residence Holland House in Kensington. It was bequeathed by Lady Holland to Edward, Prince of Wales in 1889 and entered the Royal Collection. It hangs at Osborne House on the Isle of Wight.

A different painting without the hat and her hair falling from her shoulders, painted around the same time, is now in the Watts Gallery in Surrey.

== Bibliography ==
- Bills, Mark & Bryant, Barbara. G.F. Watts: Victorian Visionary : Highlights from the Watts Gallery Collection. Yale University Press, 2008.
- Dakers, Caroline. The Holland Park Circle: Artists and Victorian Society. Yale University Press, 1999.
- Gaja, Katerine. G. F. Watts in Italy: A Portrait of the Artist as a Young Man. Olschki, 1995.
