= Cardinal Wolsey at the Gate of Leicester Abbey =

Charles West Cope

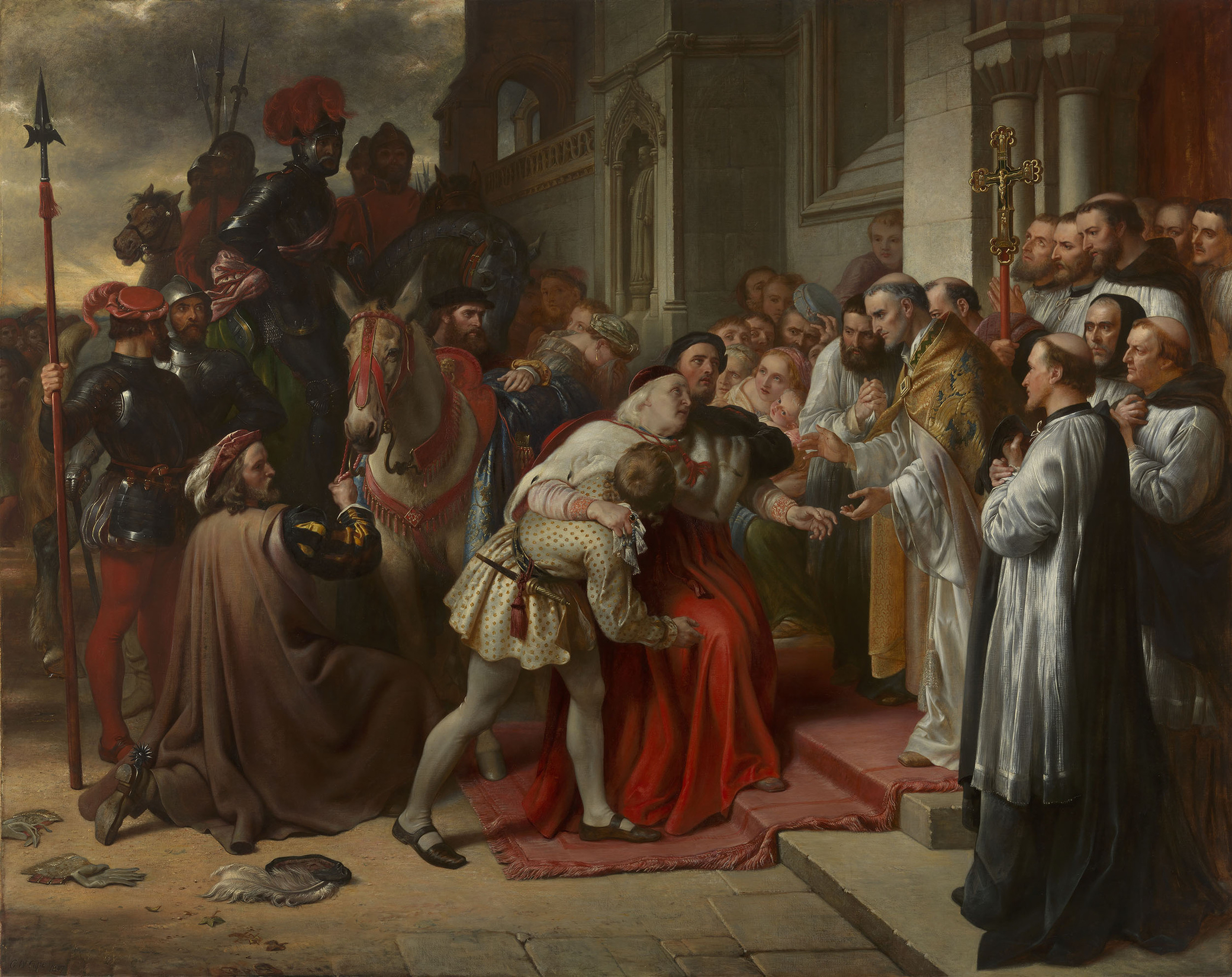
- Artist: Charles West Cope
- Year: 1847
- Type: Oil on canvas, history painting
- Dimensions: 235.5 cm × 298.4 cm (92.7 in × 117.5 in)
- Location: Osborne House; Isle of Wight

Cardinal Wolsey at the Gate of Leicester Abbey is an 1847 history painting by the British artist Charles West Cope.

== Description ==
It depicts the English statesman Cardinal Wolsey arriving at Leicester Abbey in 1529 following his rapid fall from Henry VIII's favour. He had been summoned south to face the king's judgment but too ill to continue he stopped at Leicester where he died. The painting depicts him being assisted by the canons regular of the pre-Dissolution abbey. Cope had assistance from the animal painter Edwin Landseer with the head of the mule.

The painting was displayed at the Royal Academy's Summer Exhibition of 1848 at the National Gallery. Today it is in the Royal Collection at Osborne House on the Isle of Wight.

== Bibliography ==
- Lloyd, Christopher & Thurley, Simon. Henry VIII: Images of a Tudor King. Phaidon Press, 1995.
- Millar, Oliver. The Victorian Pictures in the Collection of Her Majesty the Queen: Volume 1. Cambridge University Press, 1992.
