= Royal Academy Exhibition of 1848 =

1848 art exhibition in London

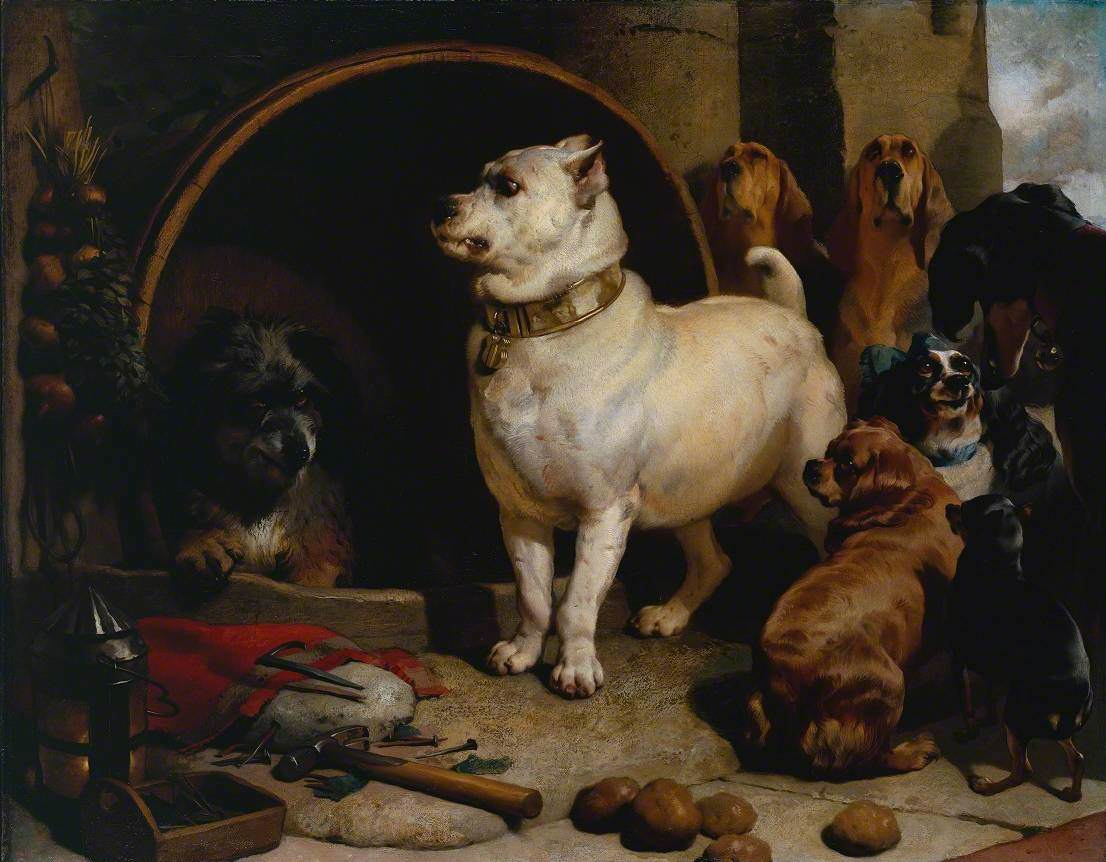
Alexander and Diogenes by Edwin Landseer

The Royal Academy Exhibition of 1848 was the eightieth annual Summer Exhibition held by the British Royal Academy of Arts. It took place in the National Gallery in London's Trafalgar Square between 1 May and 22 July 1848 and featured submissions from leading artist and architects of the early Victorian era. It coincided with the Revolutions of 1848 across much of Europe.

Paintings attracting particular attention were Edwin Landseer's A Random Shot and Charles West Cope's Cardinal Wolsey at the Gate of Leicester Abbey. Notable sculptures were Aurora by John Gibson and William Calder Marshall's Dancing Girl Reposing For the first time since the 1824 exhibition J.M.W. Turner did not submit any works, likely due to illness. The marine painter Edward William Cooke displayed Dutch Yachting on the Zuider Zee.

Edward Matthew Ward displayed his history painting Highgate Fields during the Great Fire of London, 1666. In portraiture Daniel Maclise showed a Portrait of Catherine Dickens, the wife of the novelist. John Everett Millais, shortly before joining the Pre-Raphaelite Brotherhood, submitted Cymon and Iphigenia, but this was rejected by the hanging committee.

== Gallery ==
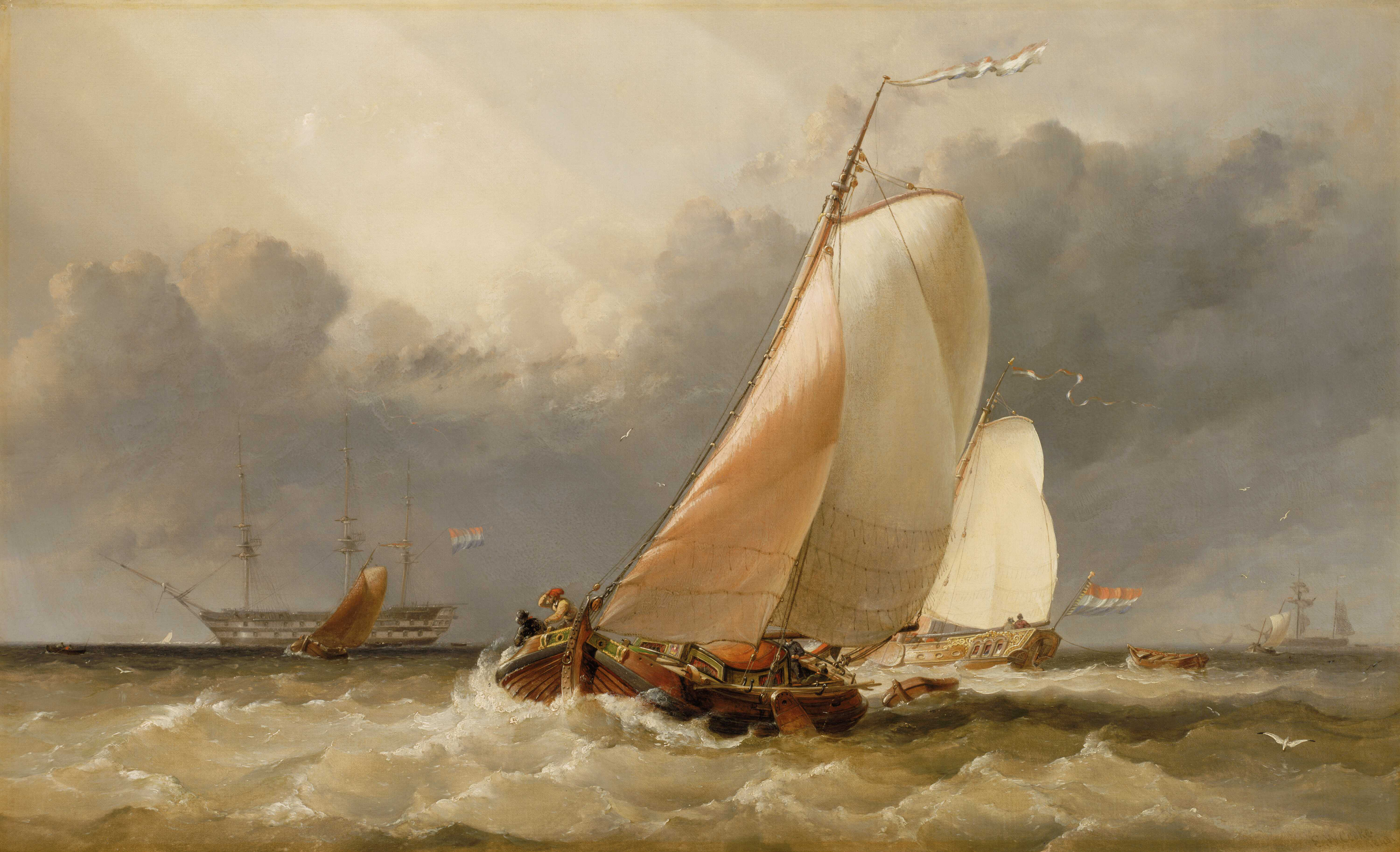
Dutch Yachting on the Zuider Zee by Edward William Cooke

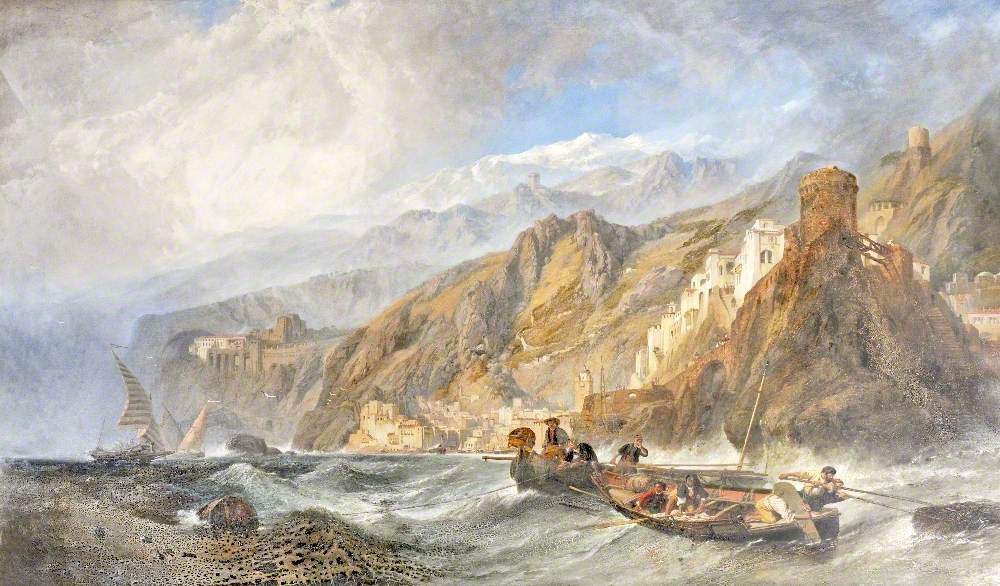
Amalfi, Birthplace of the Mariner's Compass by Clarkson Stanfield

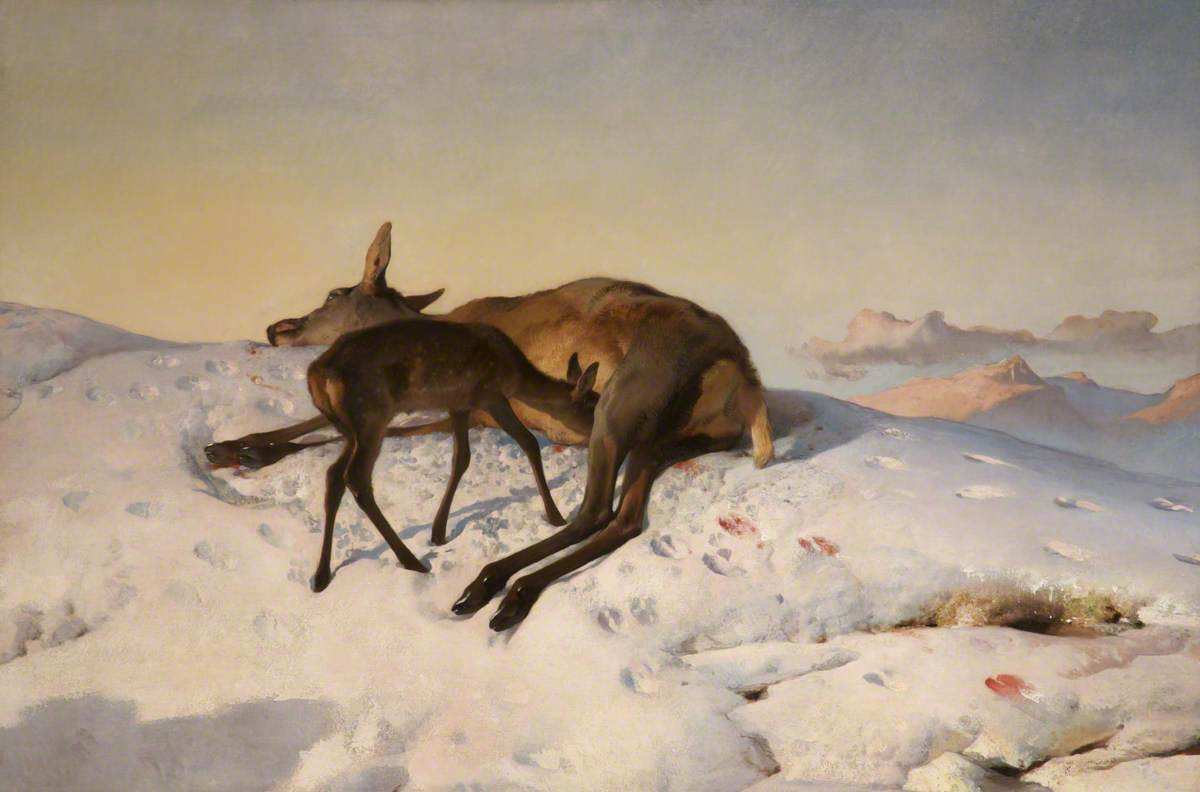
A Random Shot by Edwin Landseer

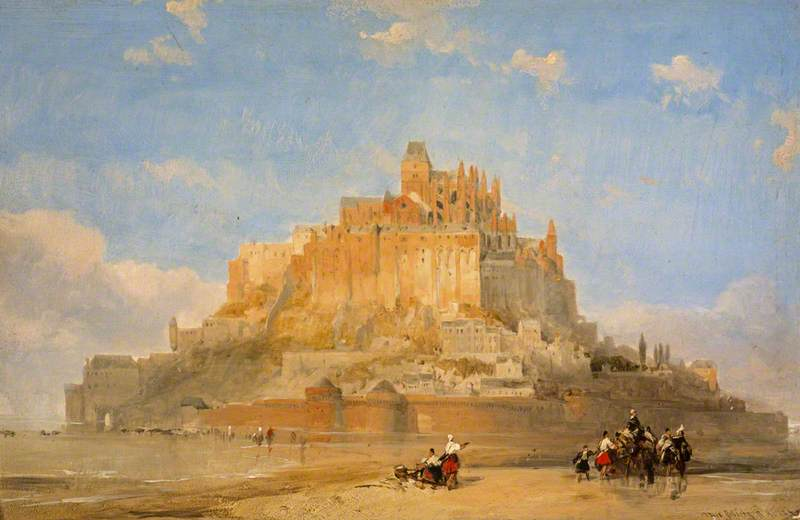
Mont Saint Nichel by David Roberts

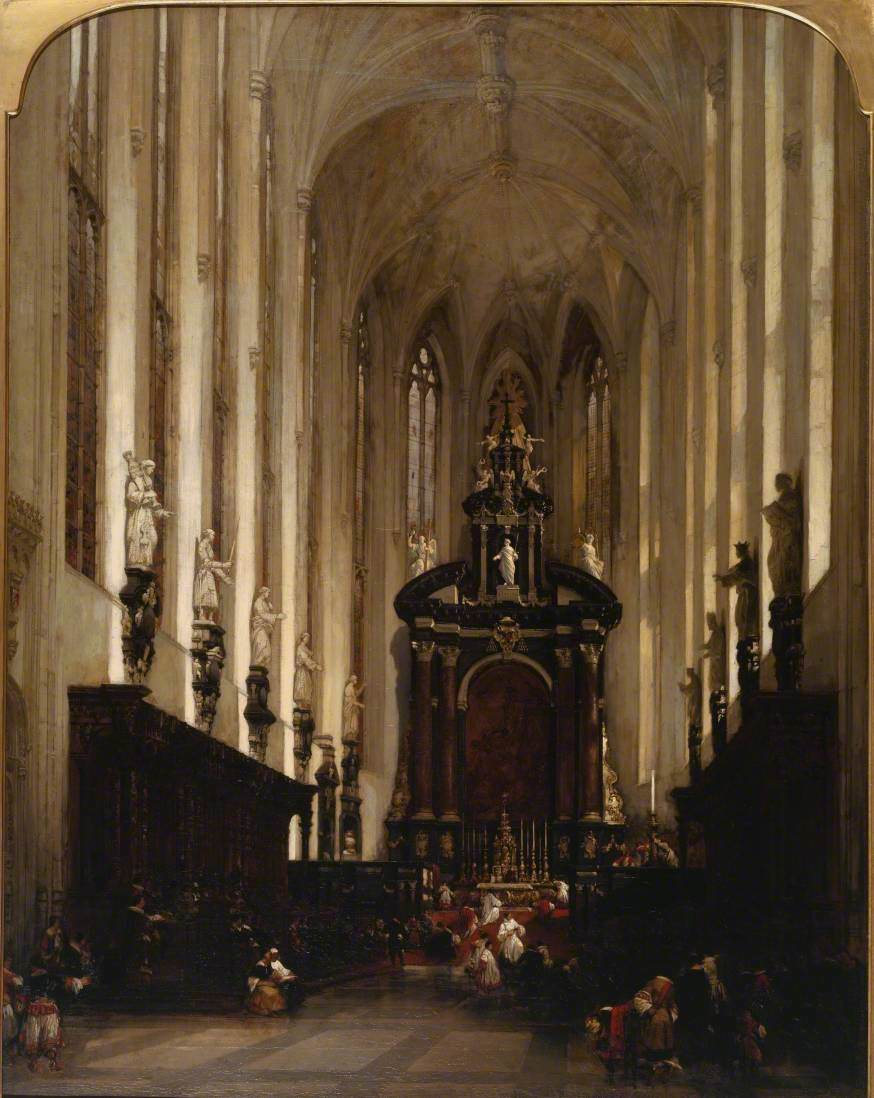
Chancel of the Collegiate Church of St Paul, at Antwerp by David Roberts

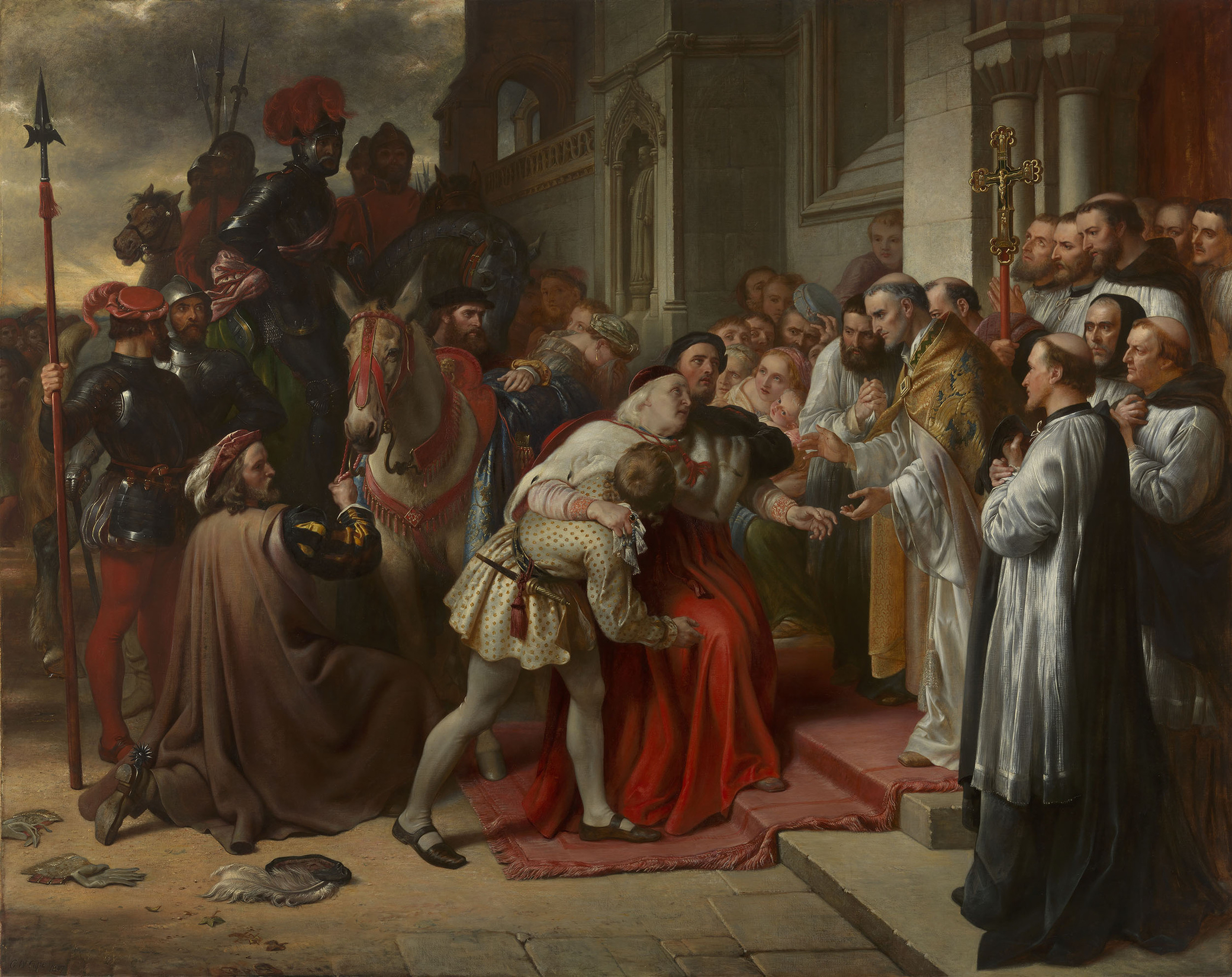
Cardinal Wolsey at the Gate of Leicester Abbey by Charles West Cope

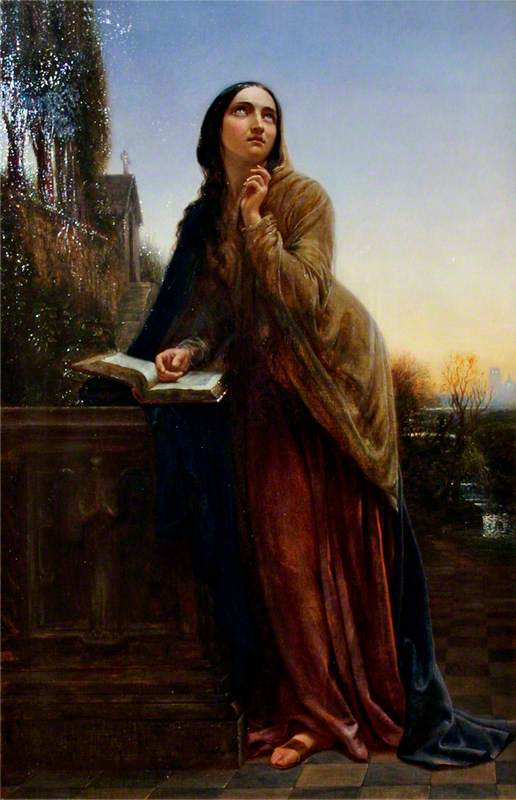
Il Penseroso by Charles West Cope

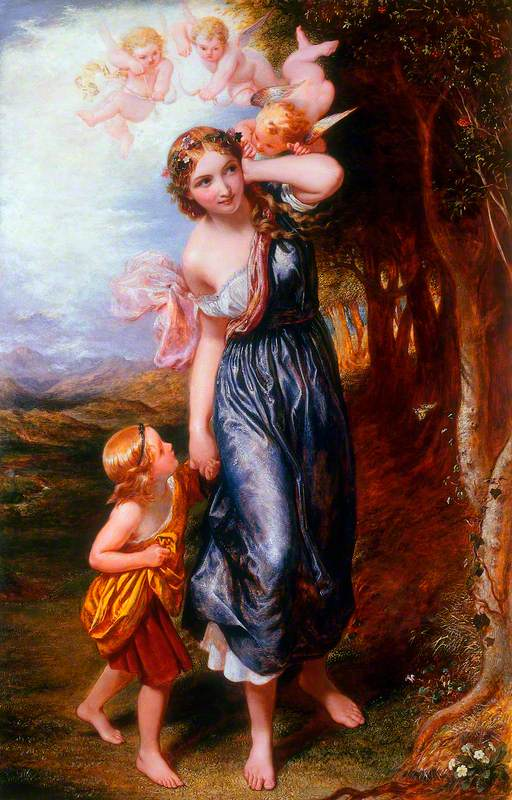
L'Allegro by Charles West Cope

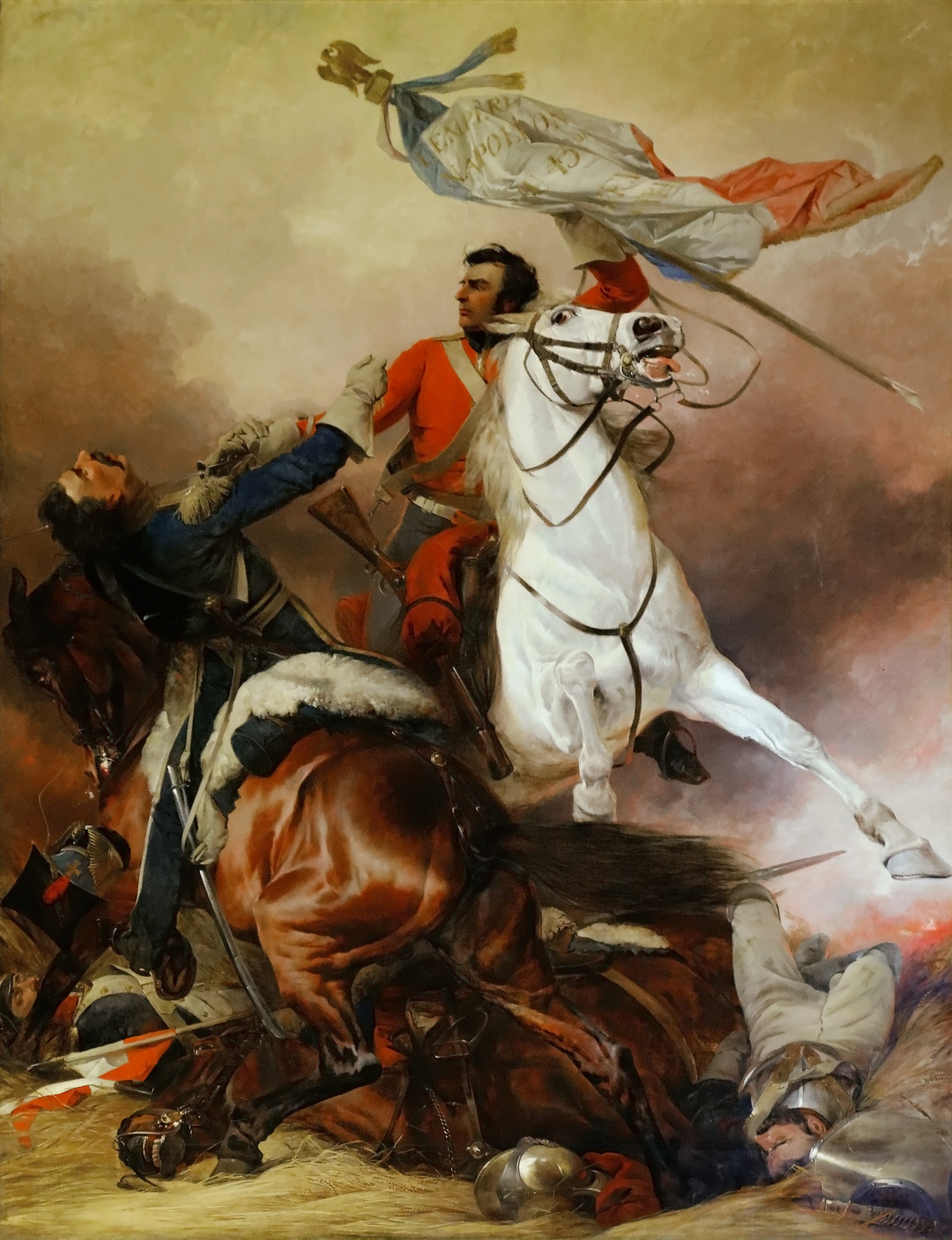
The Fight for the Standard by Richard Ansdell

A Stagecoach Adventure, 1750 by William Powell Frith

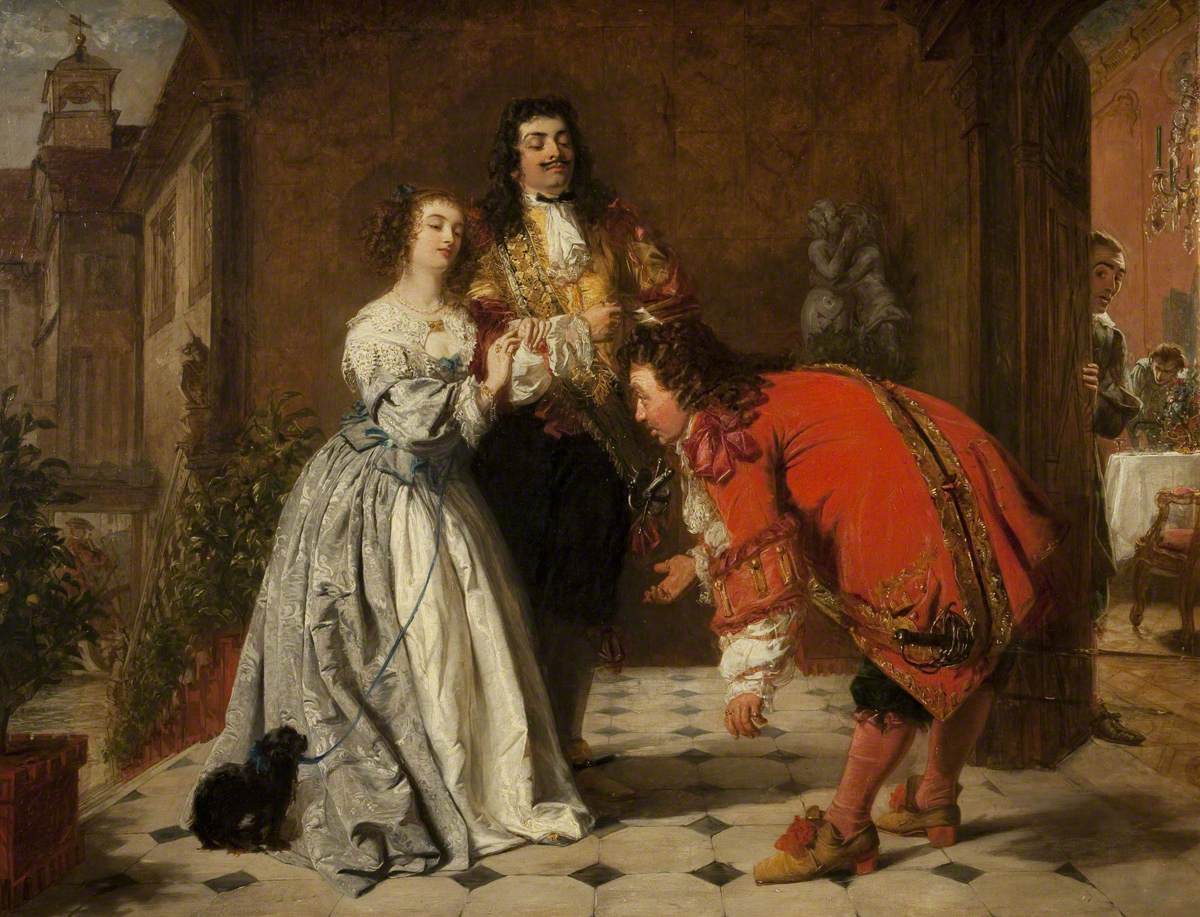
A Scene from 'Le Bourgeois Gentilhomme by William Powell Frith

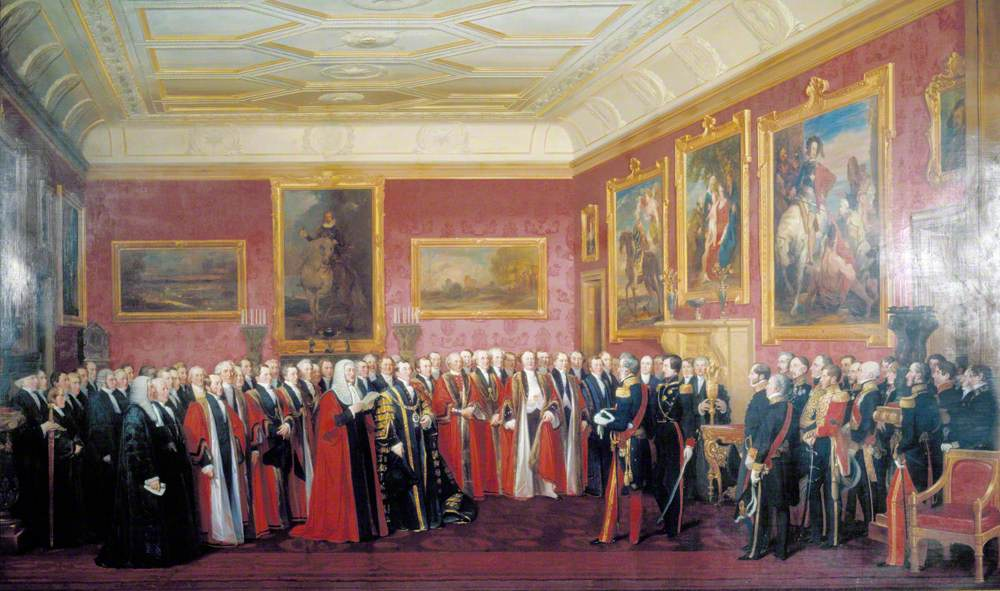
The Lord Mayor of London Presenting an Address of Congratulation to Louis-Philippe at Windsor Castle by Jean Alaux

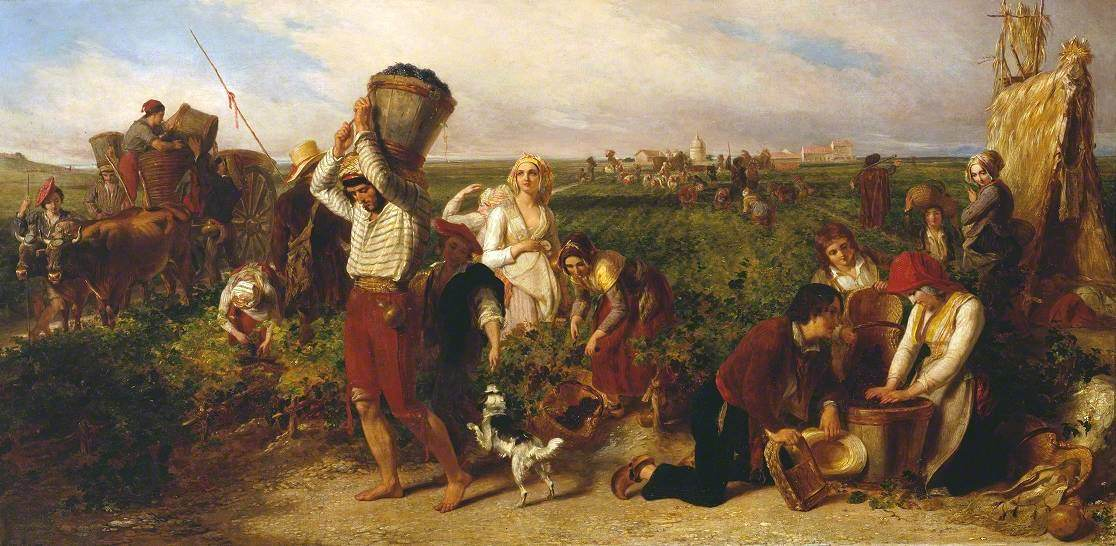
The Vintage in the Claret Vineyards of the South of France by Thomas Uwins

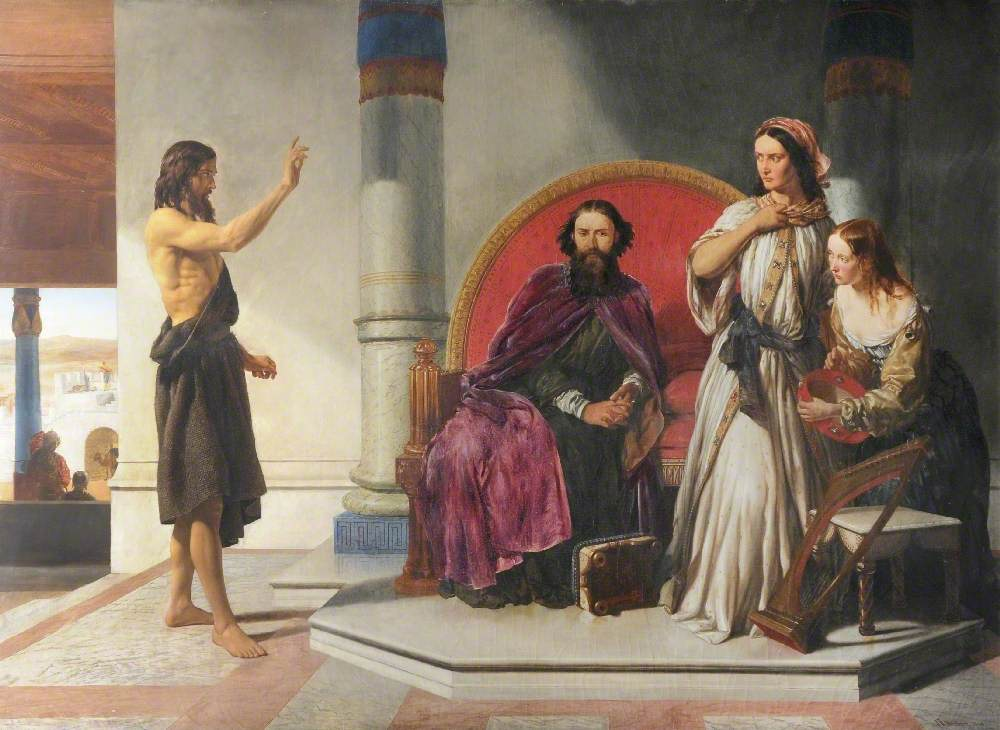
John the Baptist Reproving Herod by John Rogers Herbert

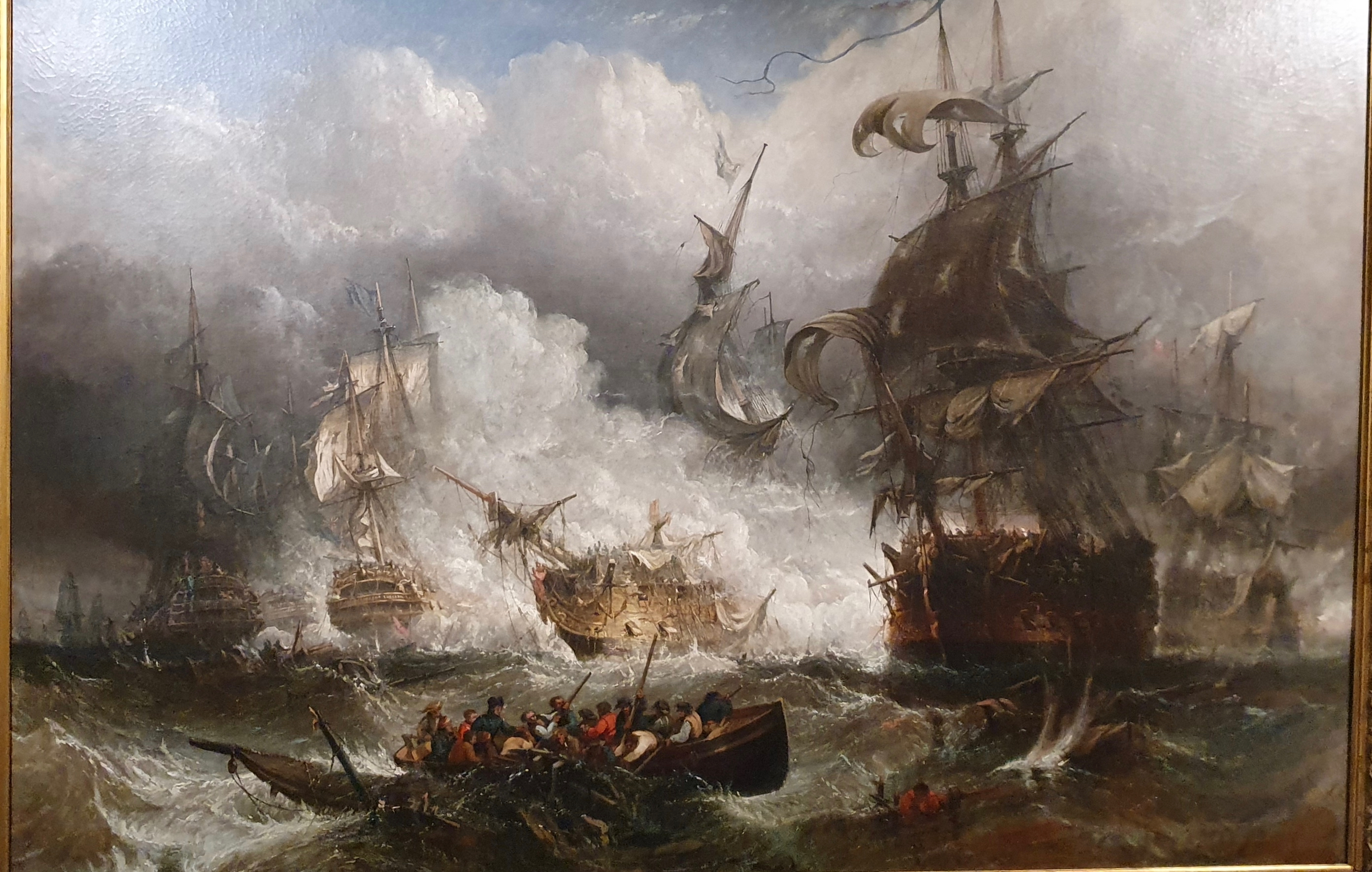
The Battle of Camperdown by William Adolphus Knell

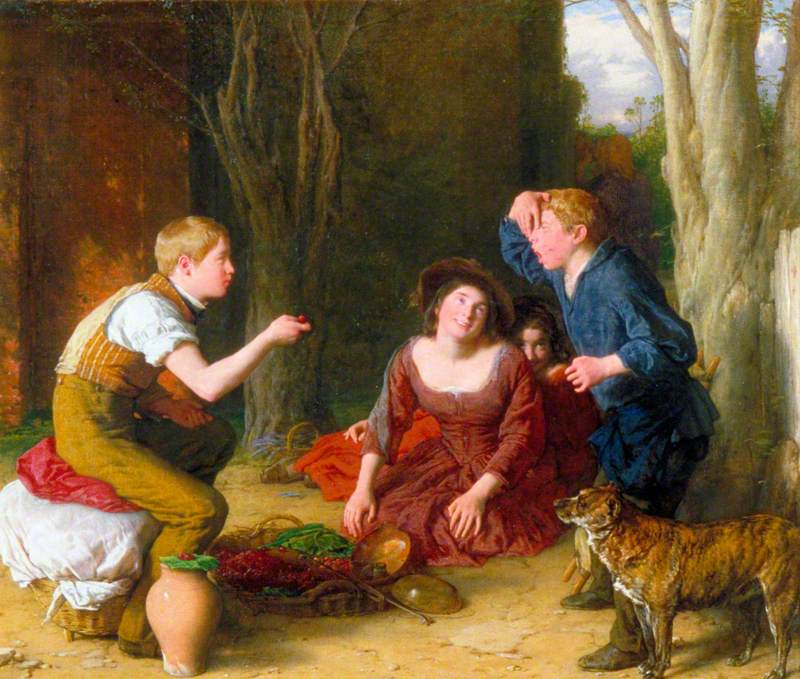
Shooting a Cherry by William Mulready

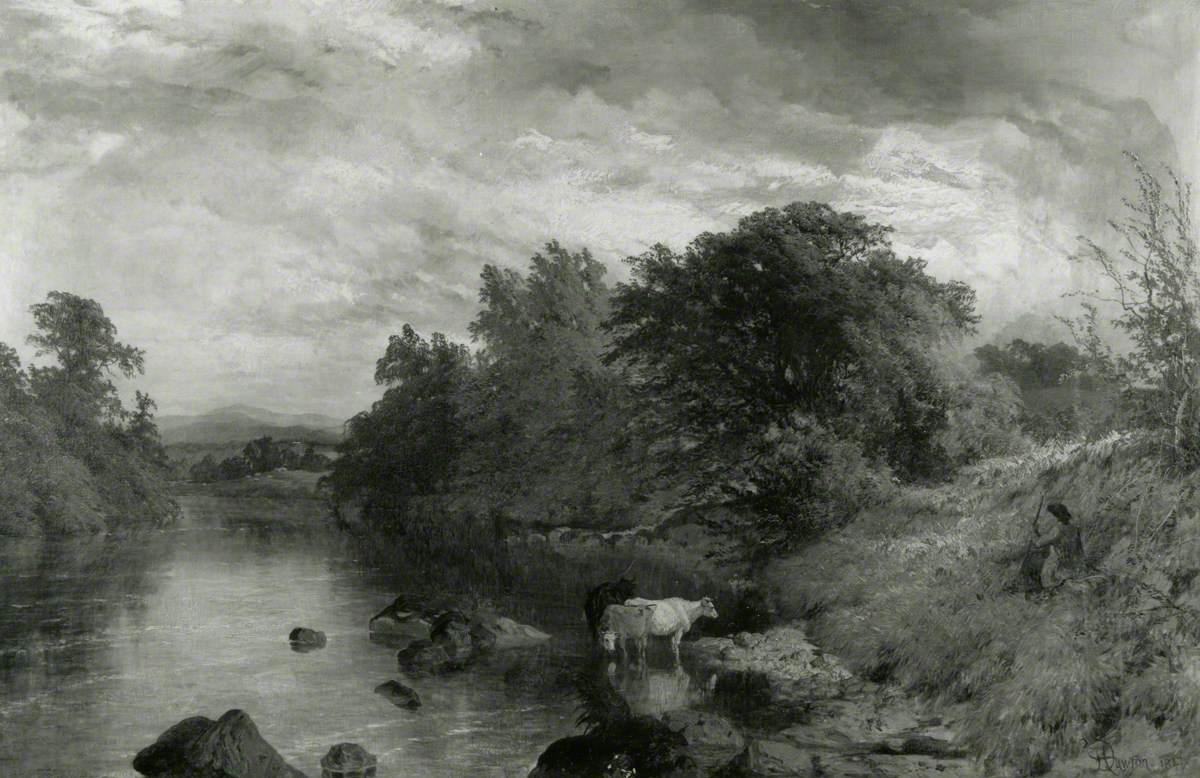
On the Ribble by Henry Dawson

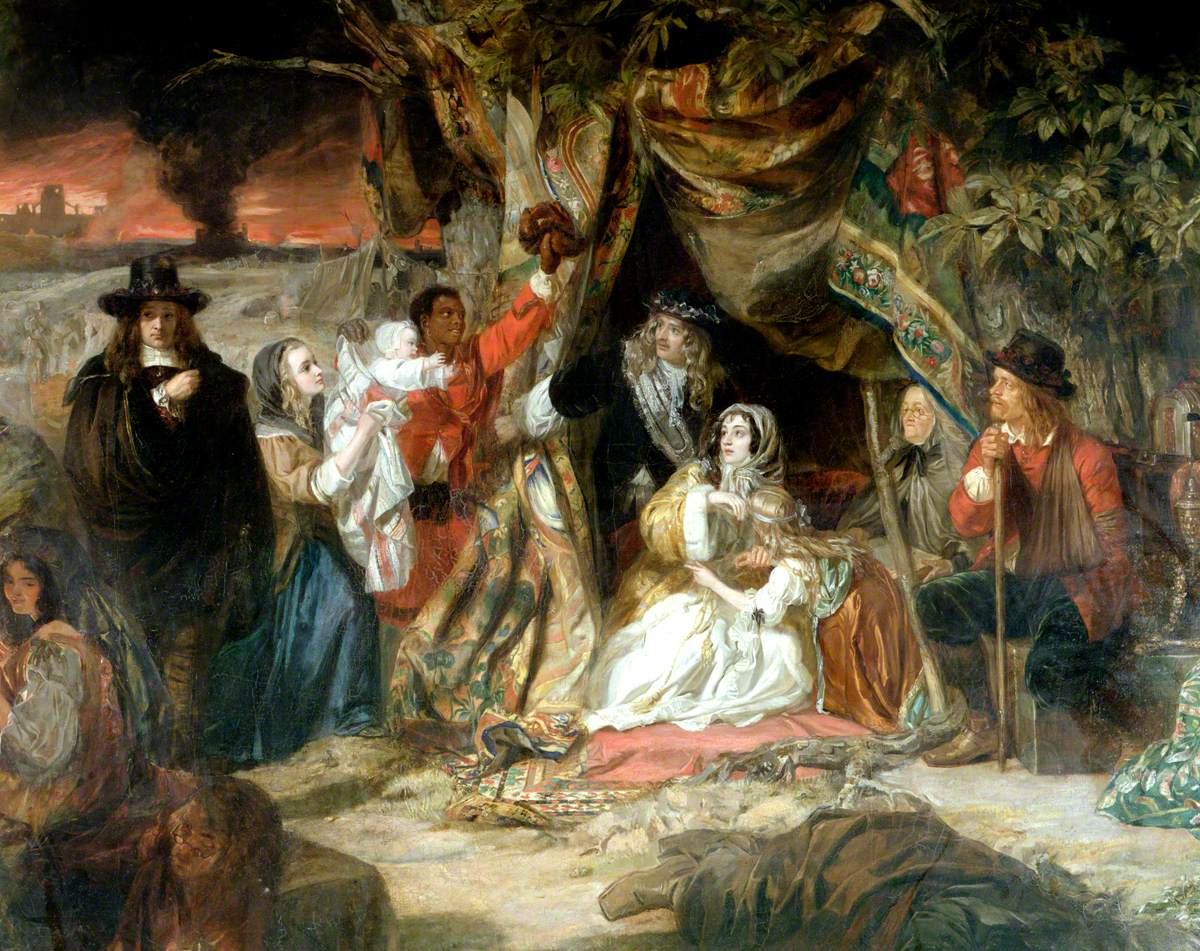
Highgate Fields during the Great Fire of London by Edward Matthew Ward

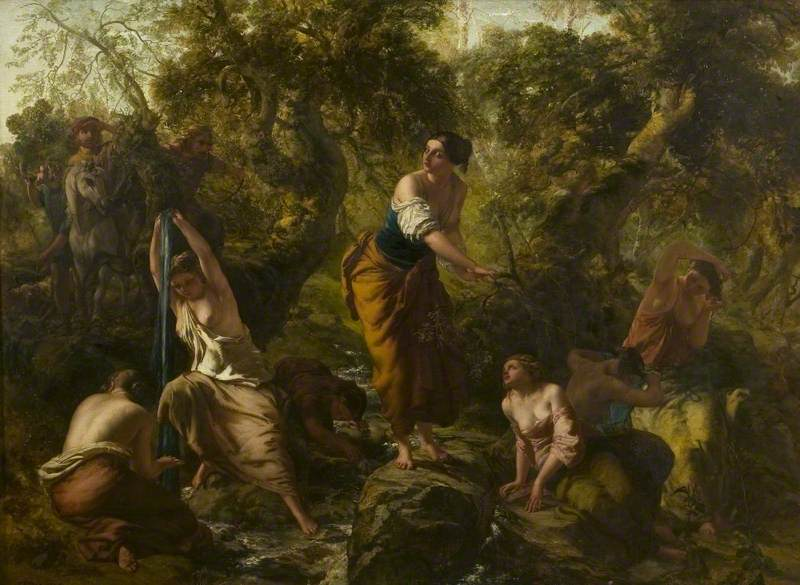
Arlète, a Peasant Girl of Falaise in Normandy, First Discovered by Duke Robert le Diable by Paul Falconer Poole

The Eve of the Deluge by John Linnell

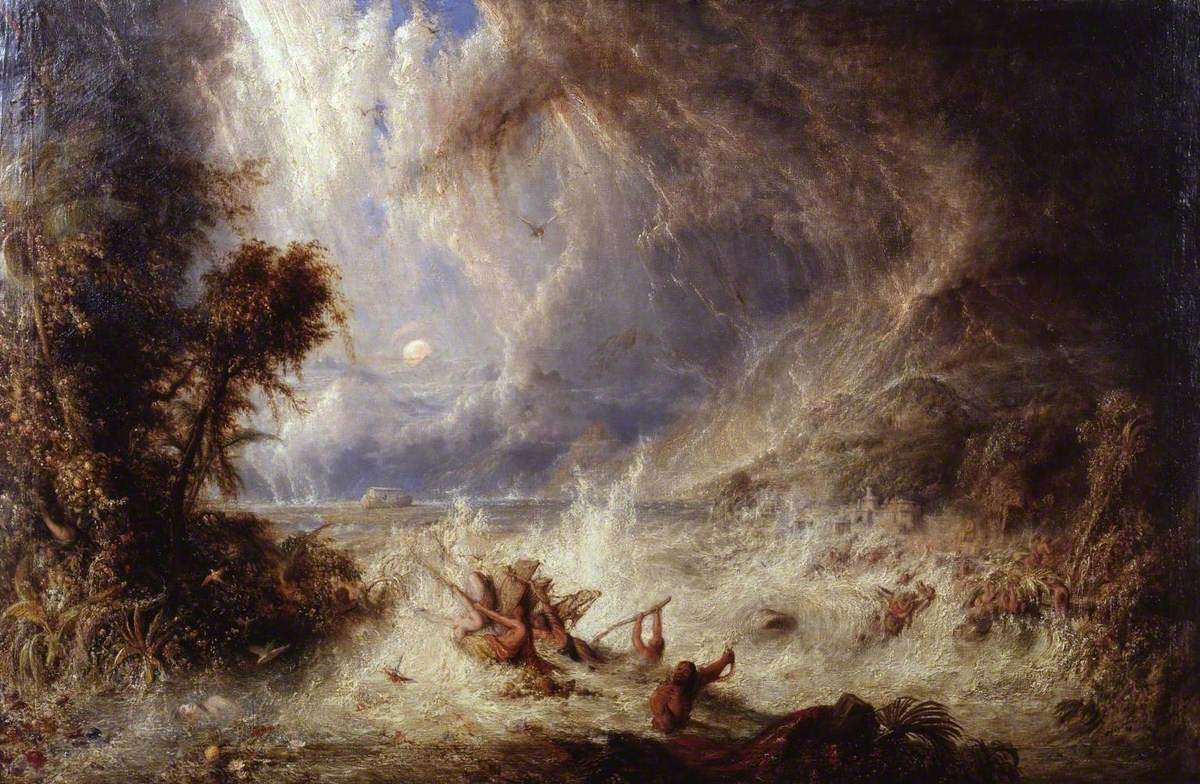
The Commencement of the Deluge by William Westall

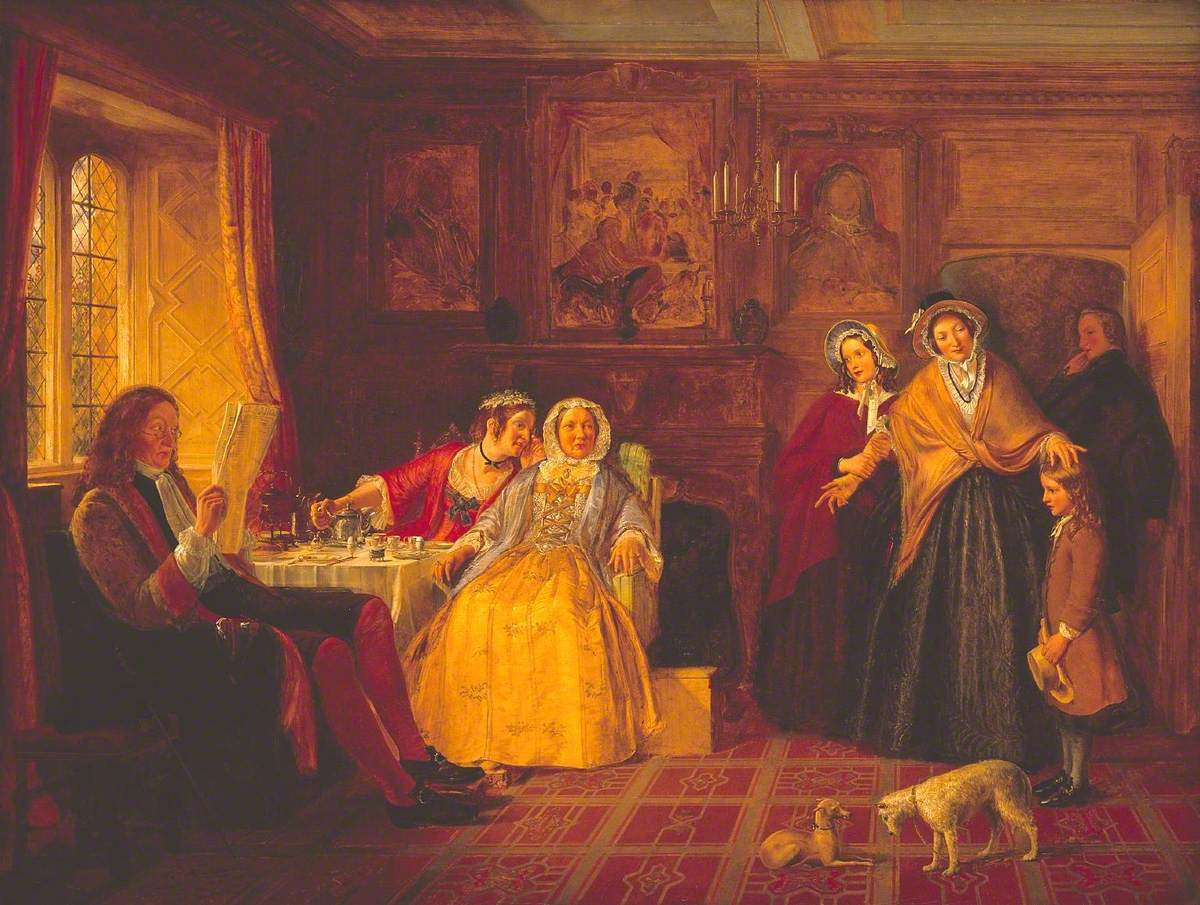
Country Cousins by Richard Redgrave

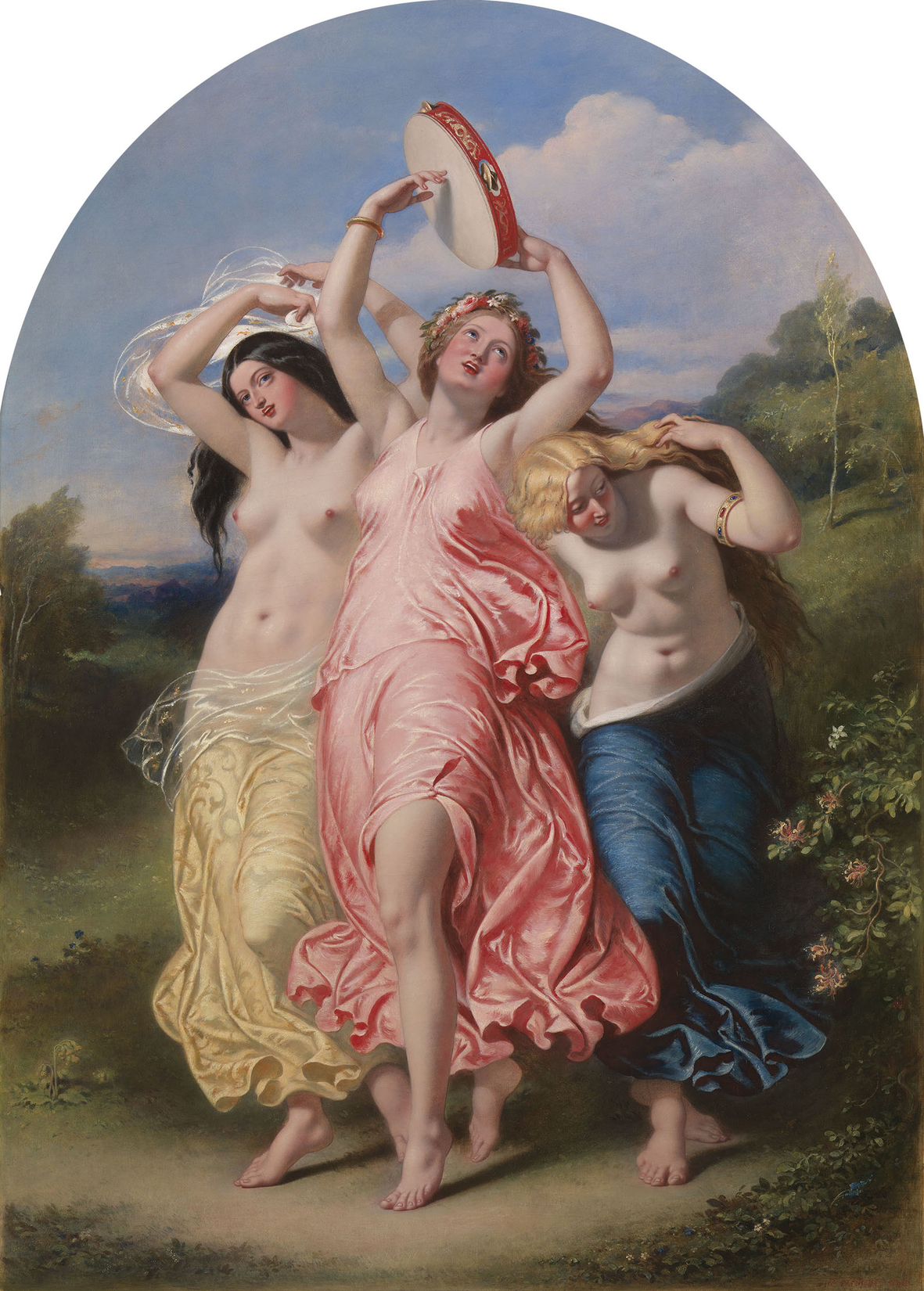
Euphrosyne by William Edward Frost

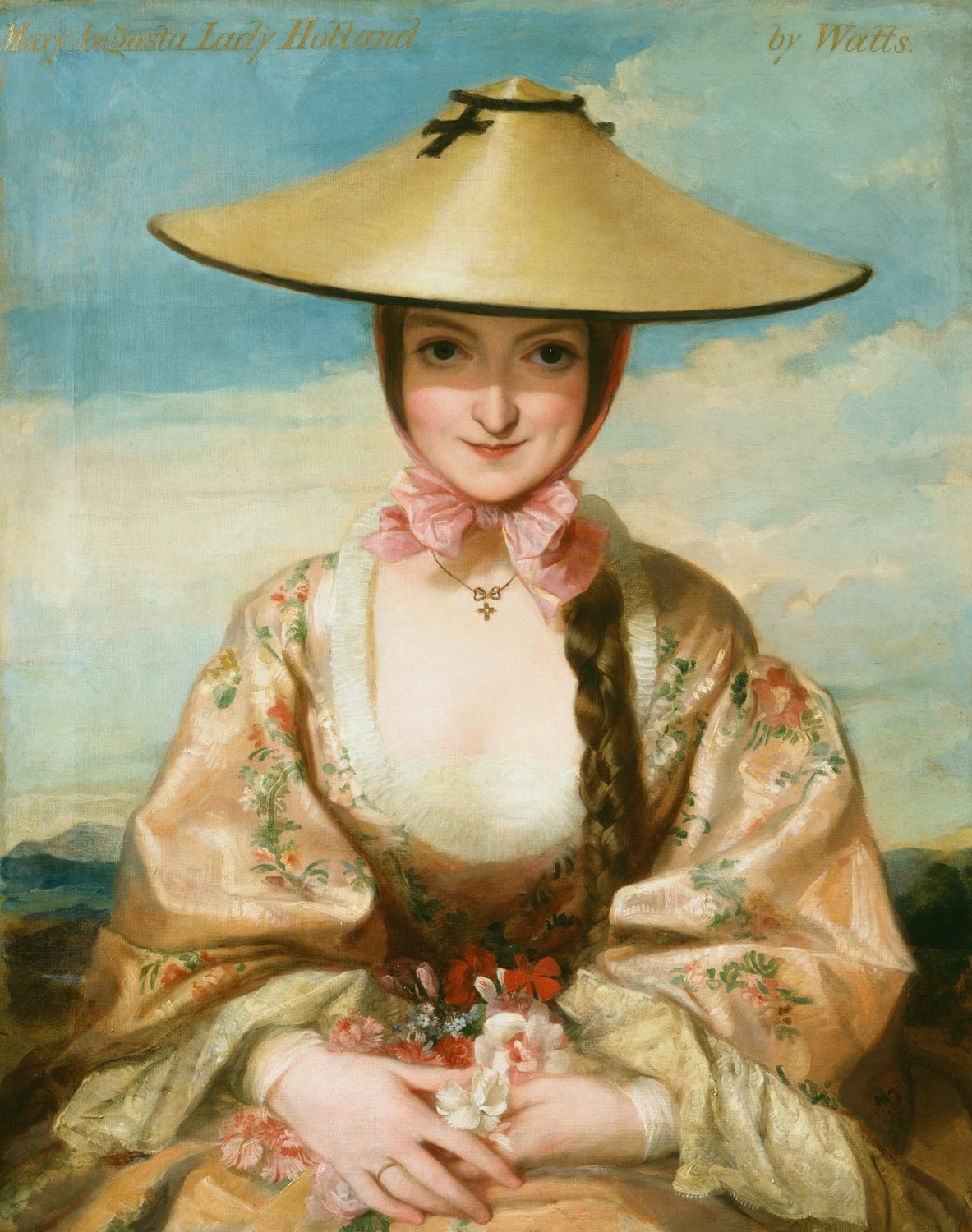
Portrait of Lady Holland by George Frederic Watts

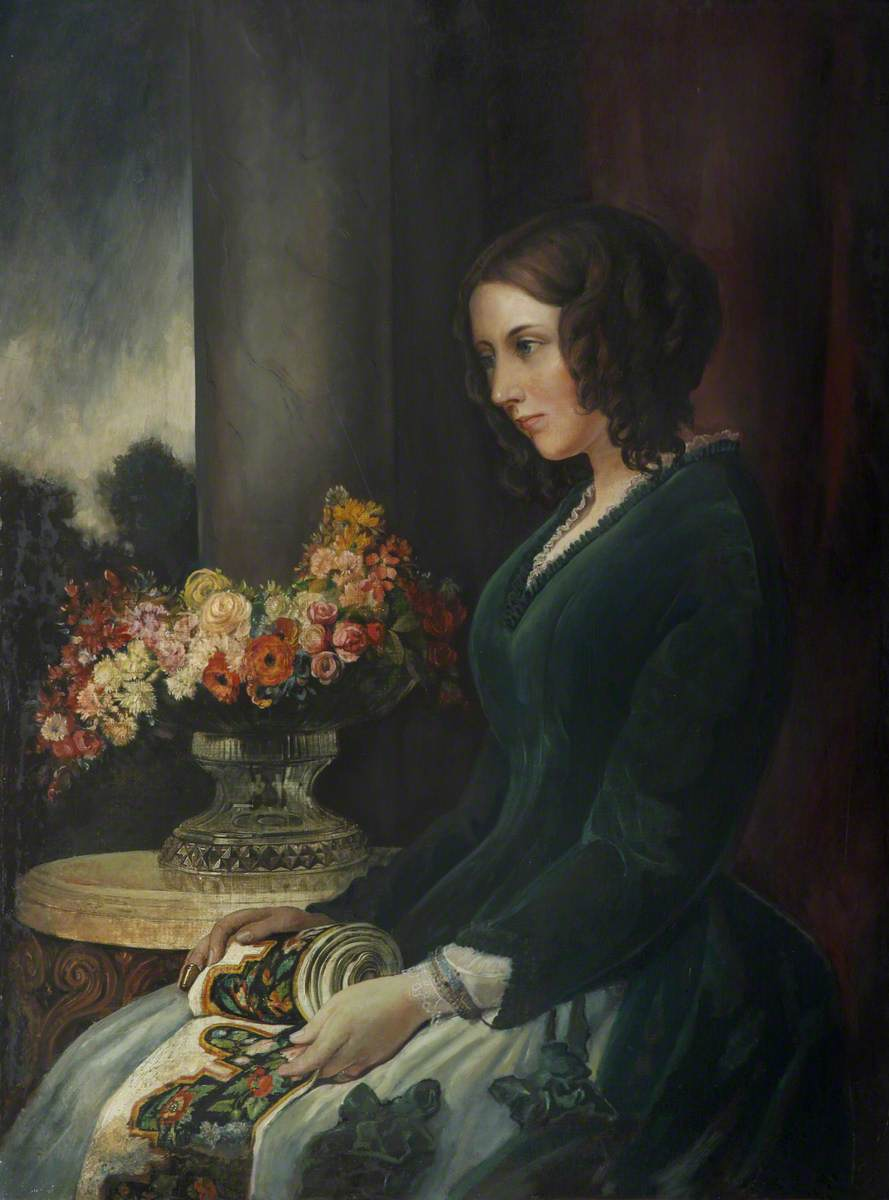
Portrait of Catherine Dickens by Daniel Maclise

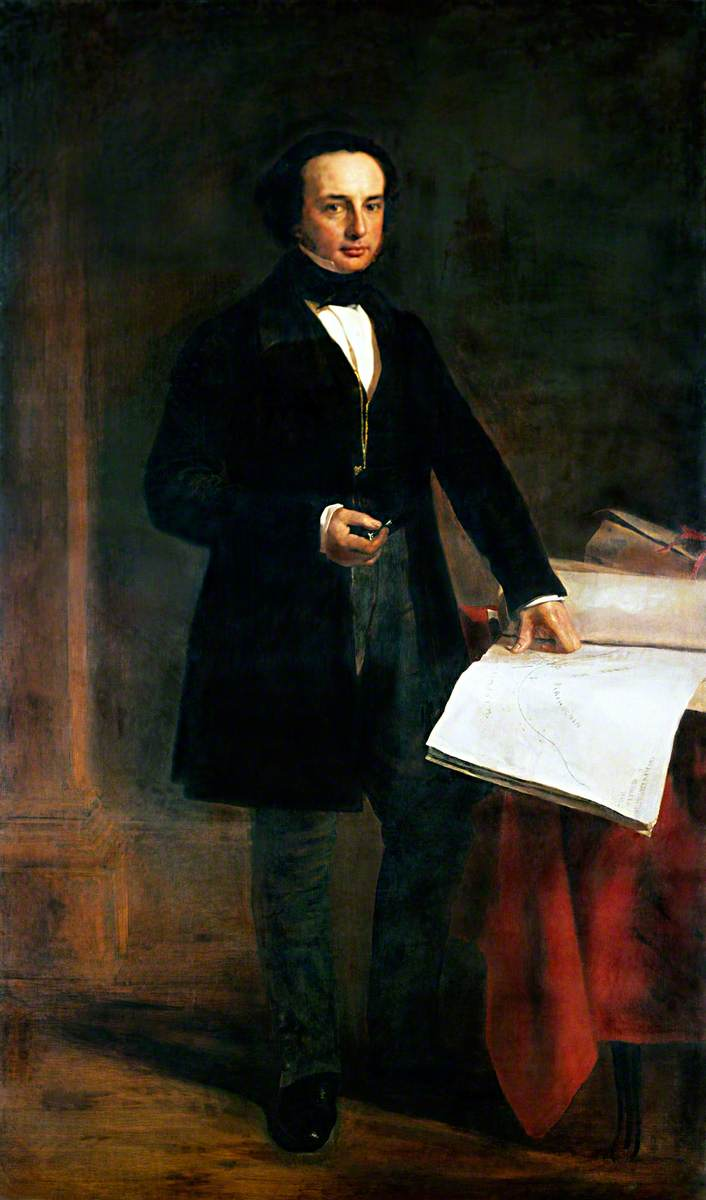
Portrait of Isambard Kingdom Brunel by John Callcott Horsley

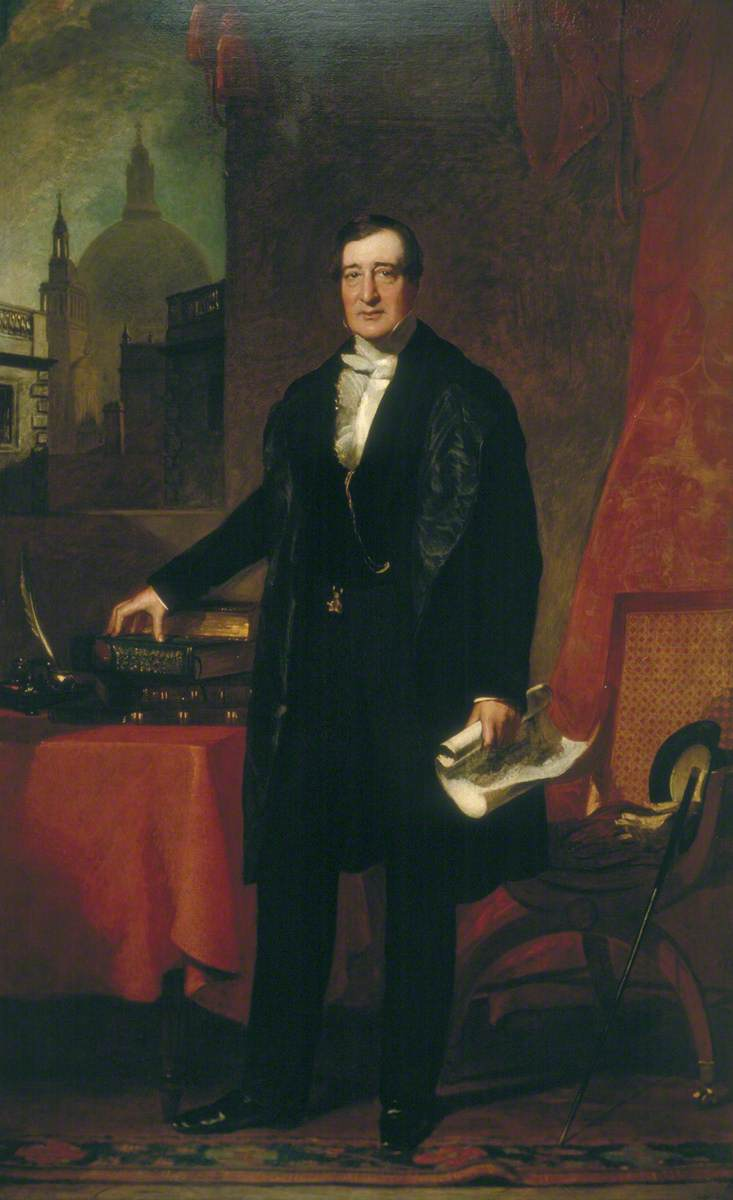
James Bentley by John Prescott Knight

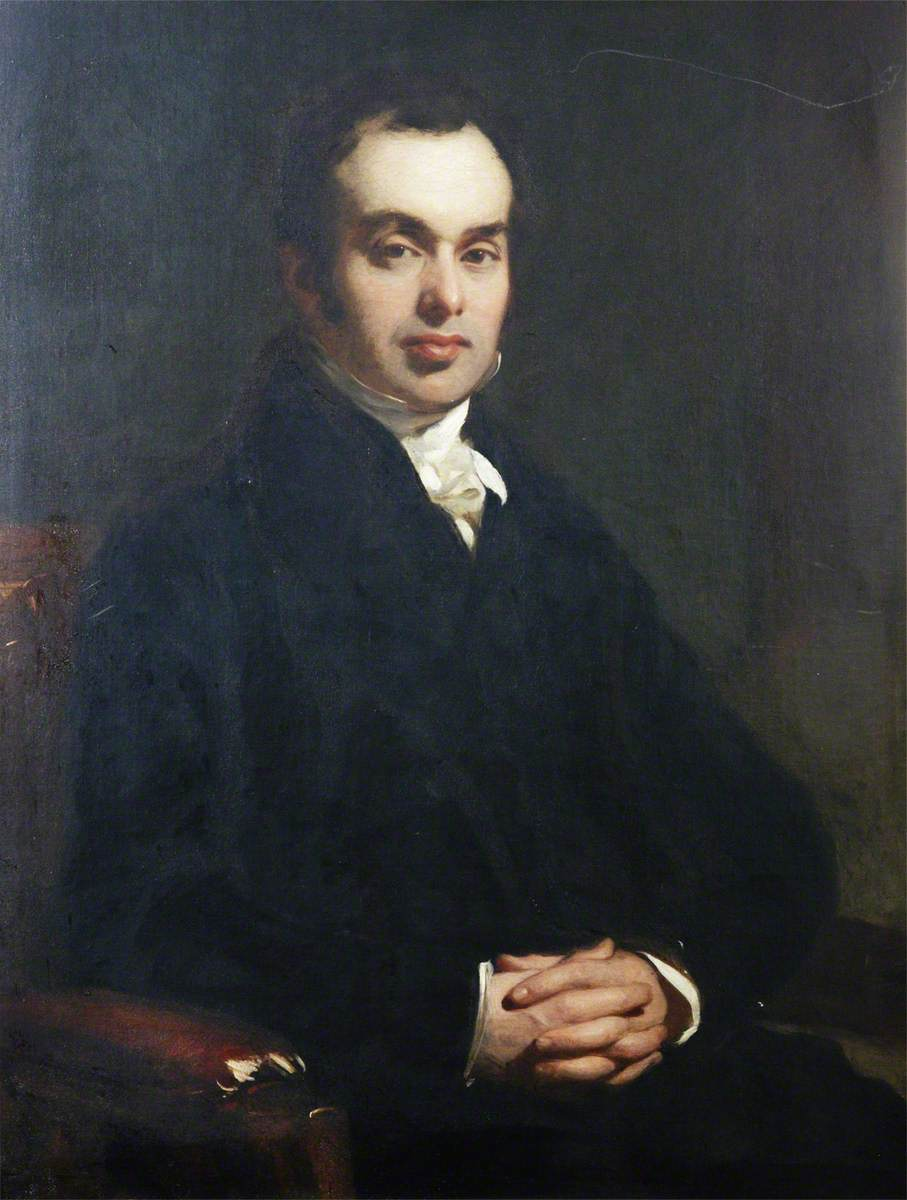
Thomas Shapter by John Prescott Knight

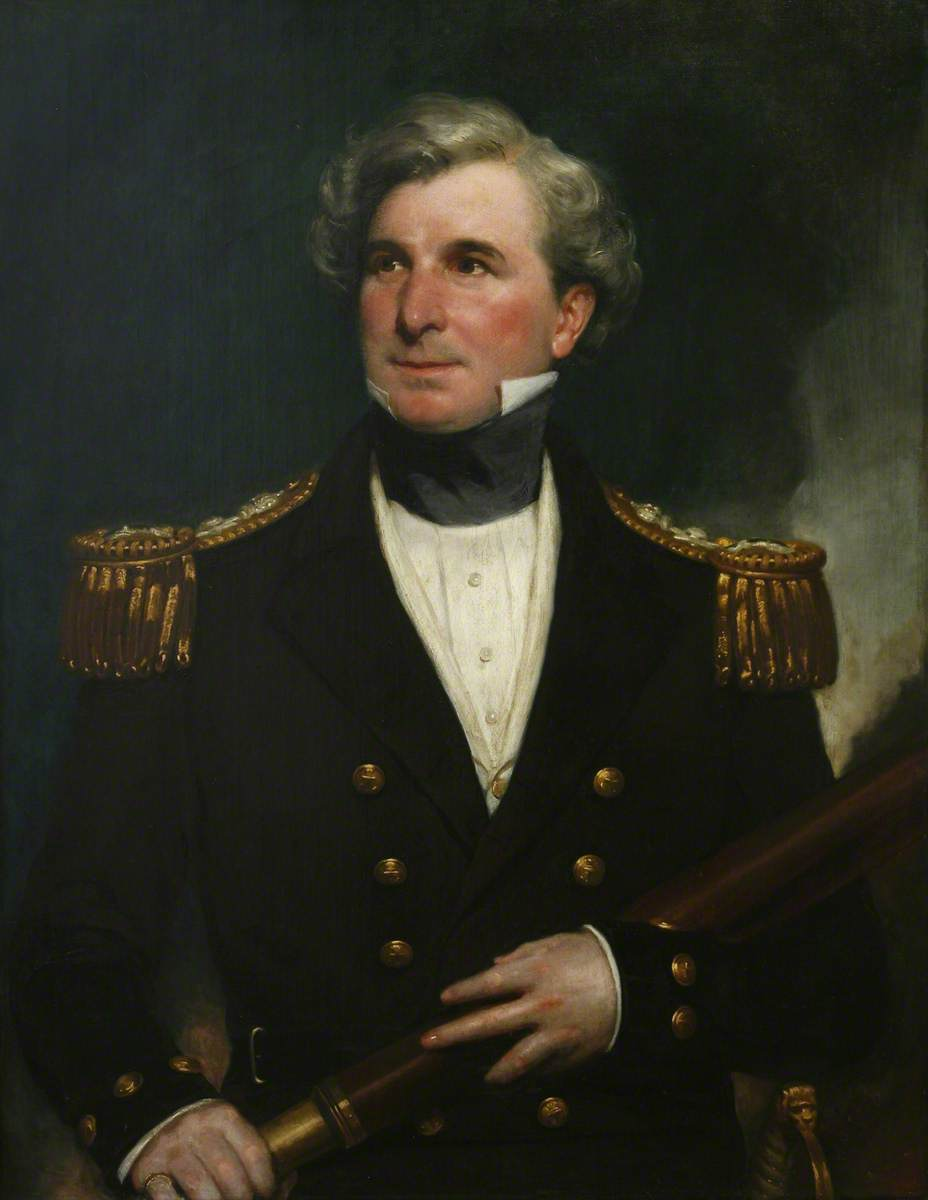
James Clark Ross by Henry William Pickersgill

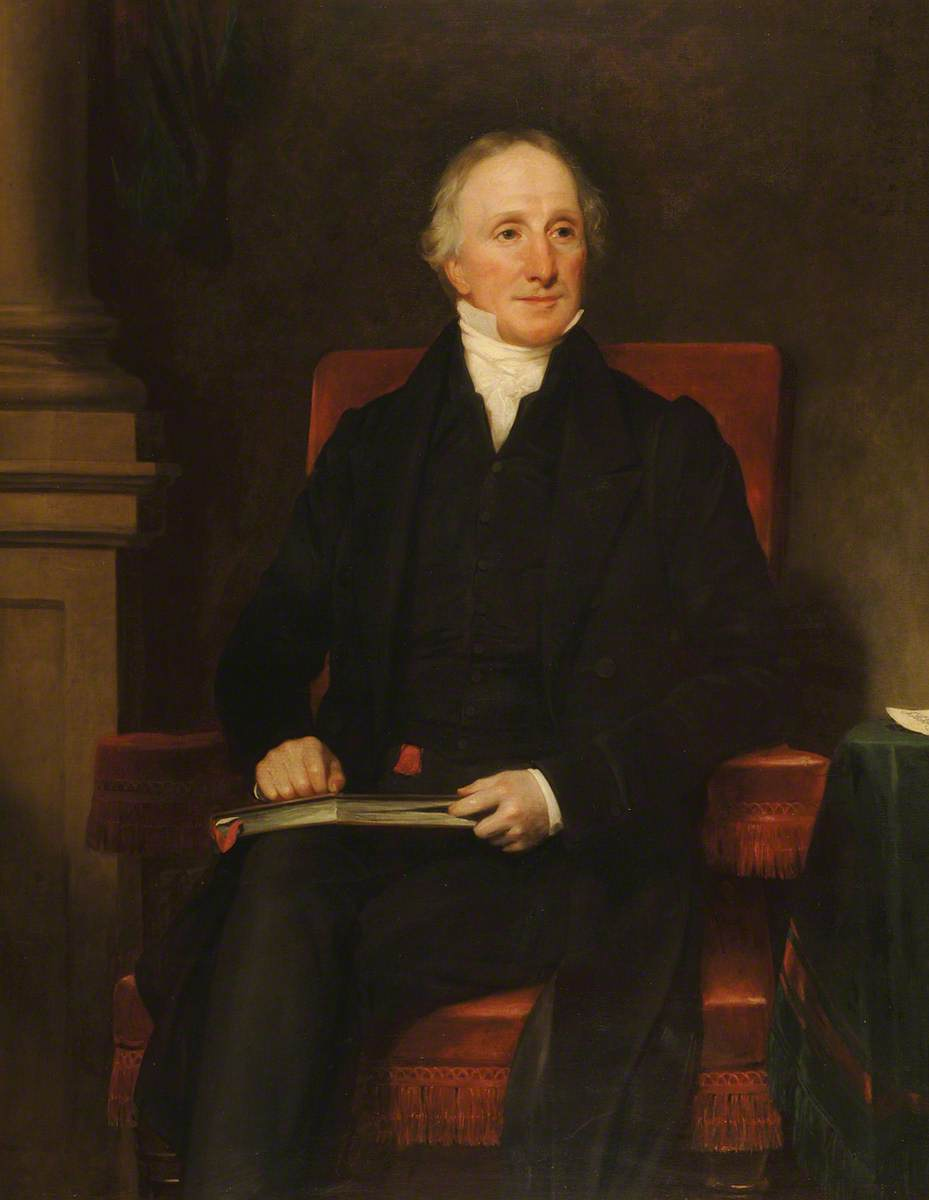
Henry Benjamin Hanbury Beaufoy by Henry William Pickersgill

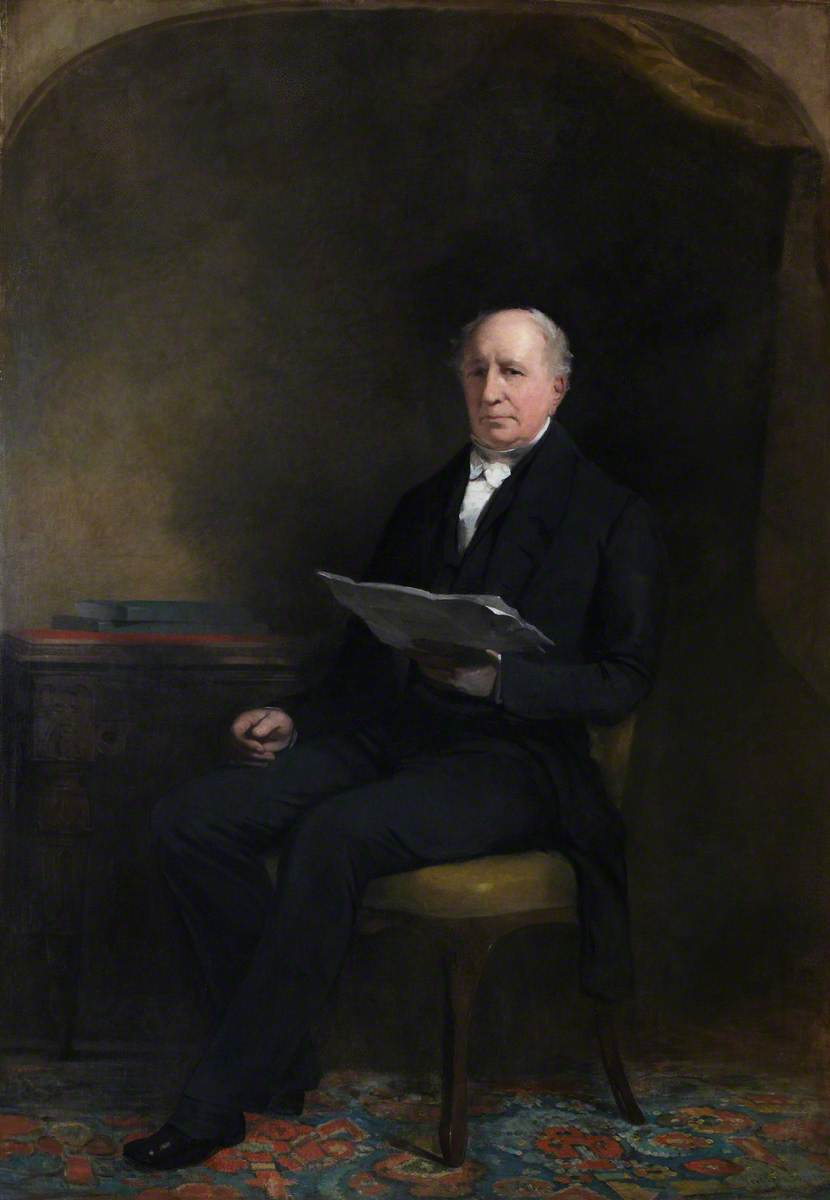
David Boyle by John Watson Gordon

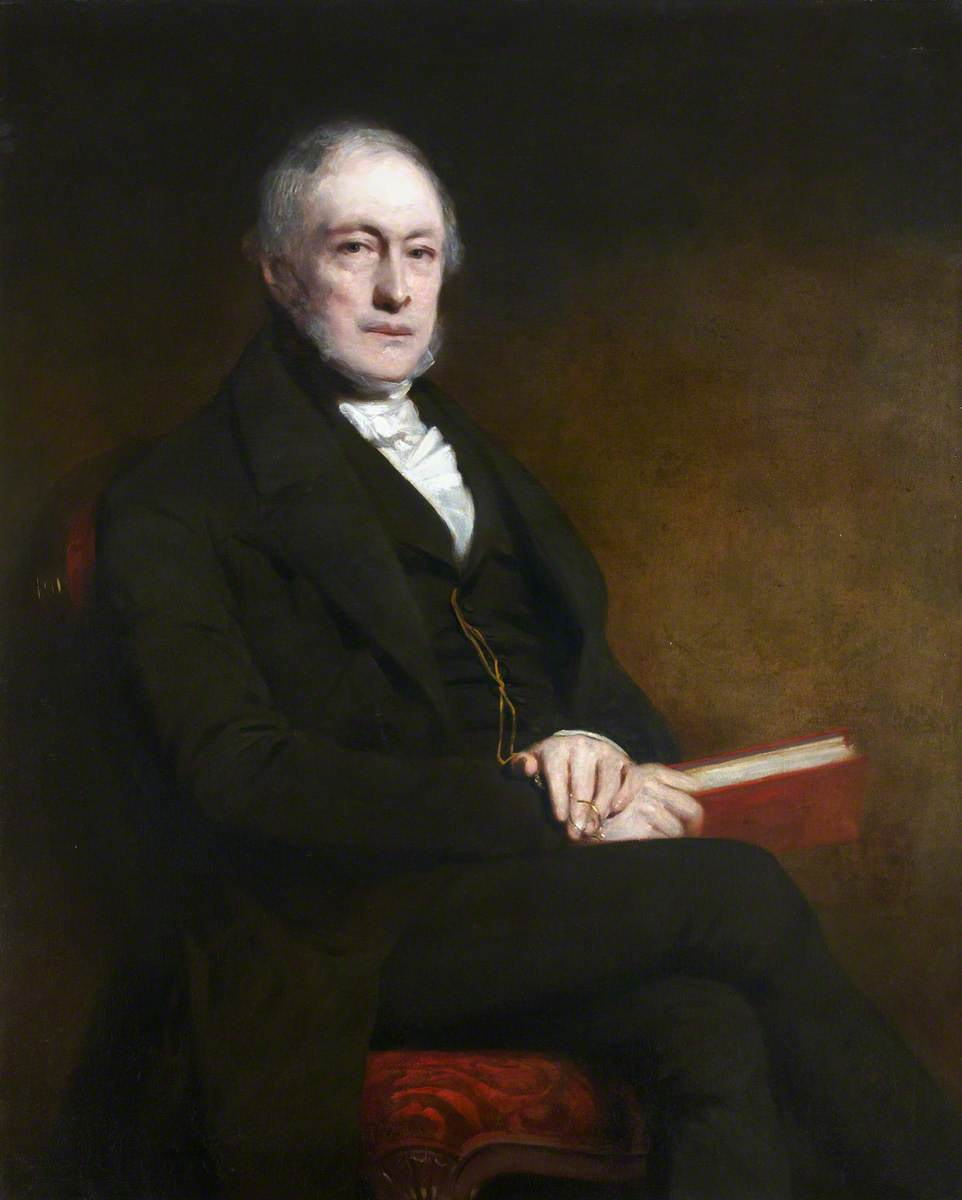
William Newbigging by John Watson Gordon

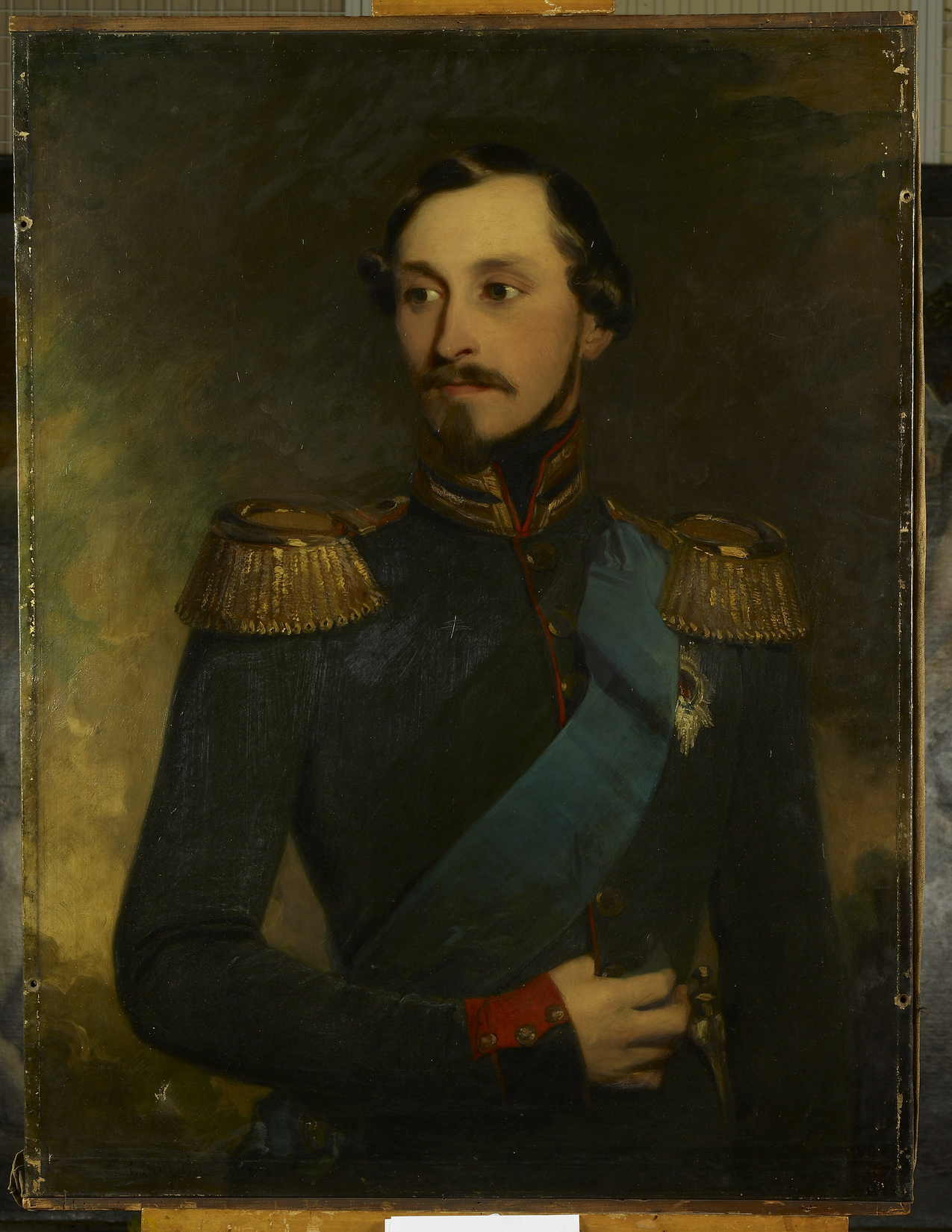
Duke of Saxe-Coburg and Gotha by Frederick Richard Say

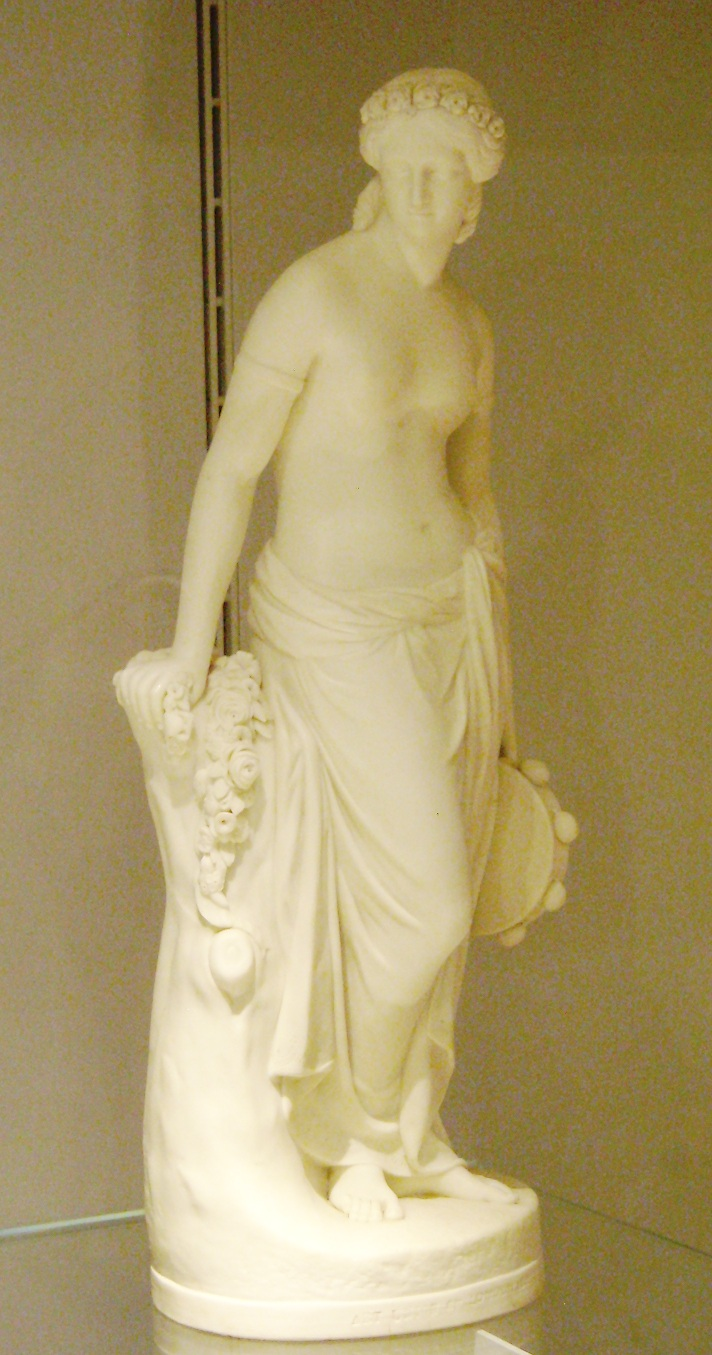
Dancing Girl Reposing by William Calder Marshall

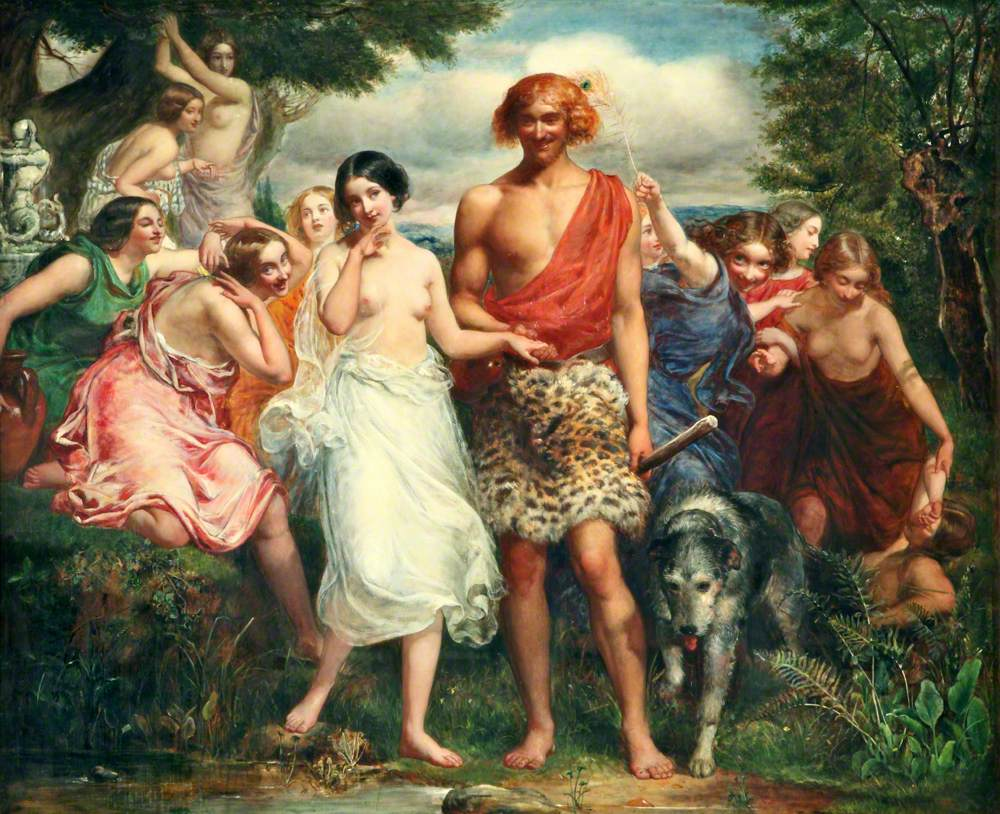
Cymon and Iphigenia by John Everett Millais. Rejected by the hanging committee.

== See also ==
- Salon of 1848, a contemporary art exhibition held in Paris

== Bibliography ==
- Hamilton, James (ed.) Turner and Italy. National Galleries of Scotland, 2009.
- Smith, Alison. The Victorian Nude: Sexuality, Morality and Art. Manchester University Press, 1996.
