= Dutch Yachting on the Zuider Zee =

Painting by Edward William Cooke

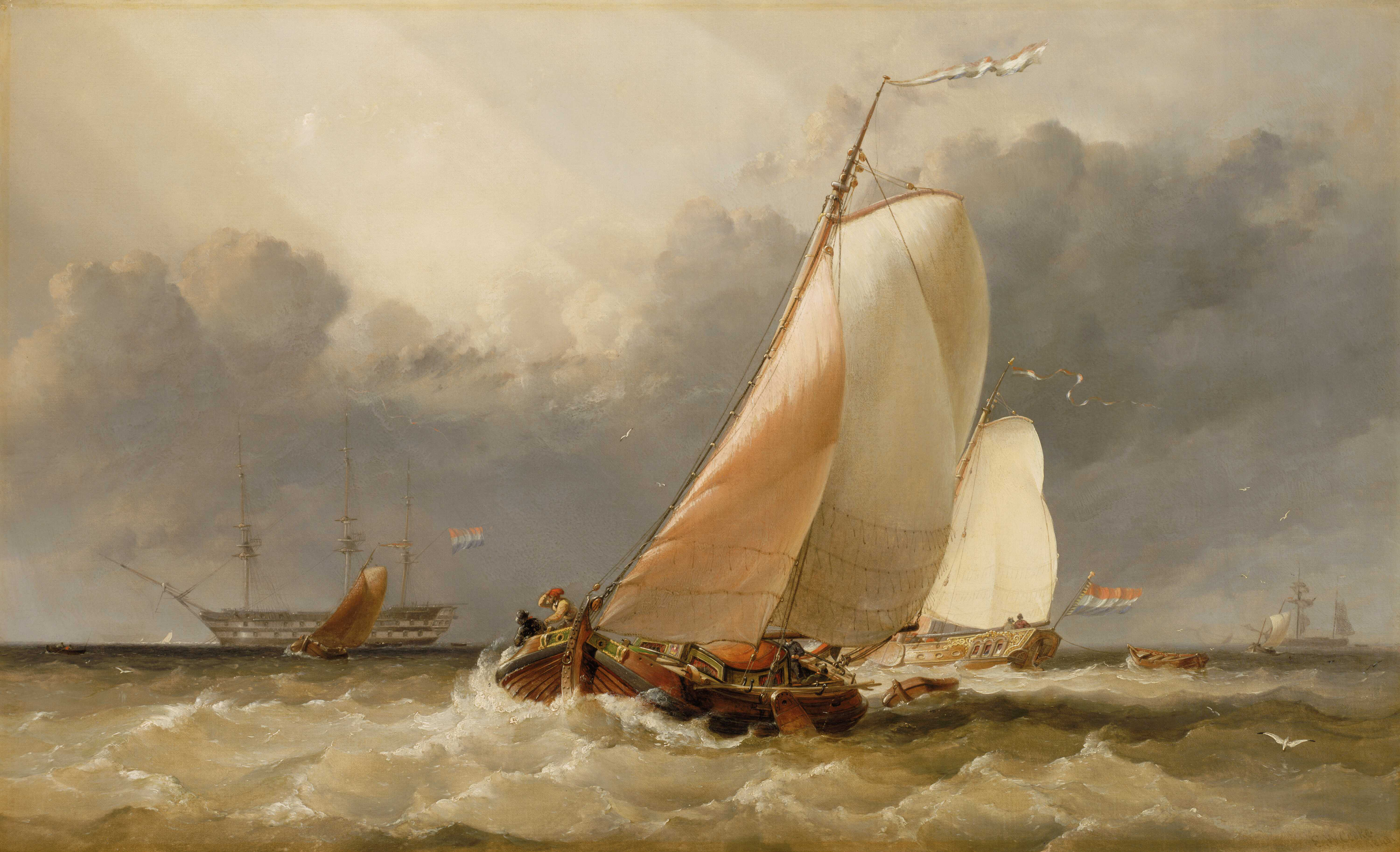
- Artist: Edward William Cooke
- Year: 1848
- Type: Oil on canvas, maritime painting
- Dimensions: 61 cm × 100.5 cm (24 in × 39.6 in)
- Location: National Maritime Museum, Greenwich

Dutch Yachting on the Zuider Zee is an 1848 oil painting by the British artist Edward William Cooke. A seascape, it depicts a scene off the coast of the Netherlands. In the foreground is a Dutch coastal merchant vessel known as a "boeier" with a yacht just behind it. In the distance is ship of the line of the Royal Netherlands Navy. A protégé of Clarkson Stanfield, the artist specialised in maritime paintings with Dutch themes. This led to him being nicknamed "Dutch Cooke" or "Van Kook".

The painting was displayed at the Royal Academy Exhibition of 1848 at the National Gallery in London. Today it is in the collection of the National Maritime Museum in Greenwich.

== Bibliography ==
- Bury, Stephen (ed.) Benezit Dictionary of British Graphic Artists and Illustrators, Volume 1. OUP, 2012.
- Munday, John. Edward William Cooke: A Man of His Time. Antique Collectors' Club, 1996.
- Van der Merwe, Pieter & Took, Roger. The Spectacular Career of Clarkson Stanfield. Tyne and Wear County Council Museums, 1979.
