= Mont Saint Michel (painting) =

Painting by David Roberts

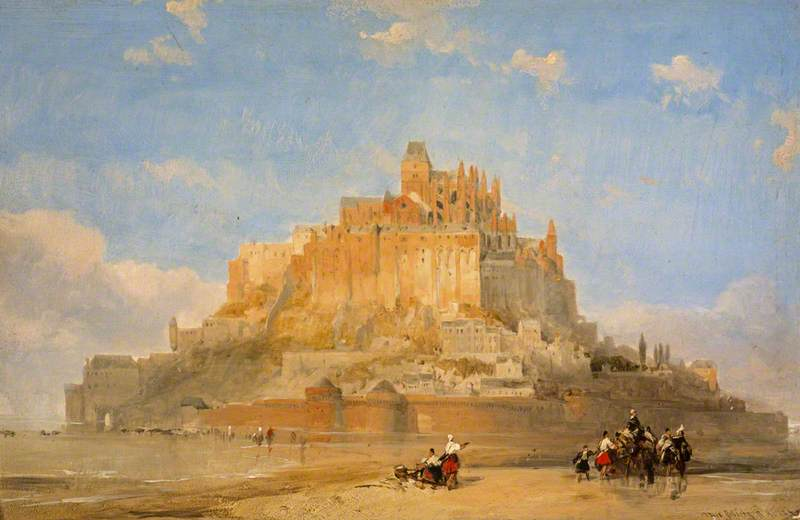
- Artist: David Roberts
- Year: 1848
- Type: Oil on panel, landscape painting
- Dimensions: 24.6 cm × 40.6 cm (9.7 in × 16.0 in)
- Location: Scottish National Gallery , Edinburgh

Mont Saint Michel is an 1848 landscape painting by the Scottish artist David Roberts. It portrays the tidal island of Mont-Saint-Michel in Normandy. Roberts was elected a member of the Royal Academy of Arts in 1841 and was particularly known for his Orientalist depictions of the Middle East, although he also painted widely in Britain and Continental Europe.

The painting was displayed at the Royal Academy Exhibition of 1848 held at the National Gallery in London. Today it is in the collection of the Scottish National Gallery in Edinburgh, having been acquired in 2008.

== See also ==
- Mont Saint Michel, Normandy, an 1838 painting by Edward William Cooke

== Bibliography ==
- Guiterman, Helen. David Roberts, 1796-1864, Artist, Adventurer. Scottish Arts Council, 1981.
- Sim, Katherine. David Roberts R.A., 1796–1864: A Biography. Quartet Books, 1984.
