= A Random Shot =

Painting by Edwin Landseer

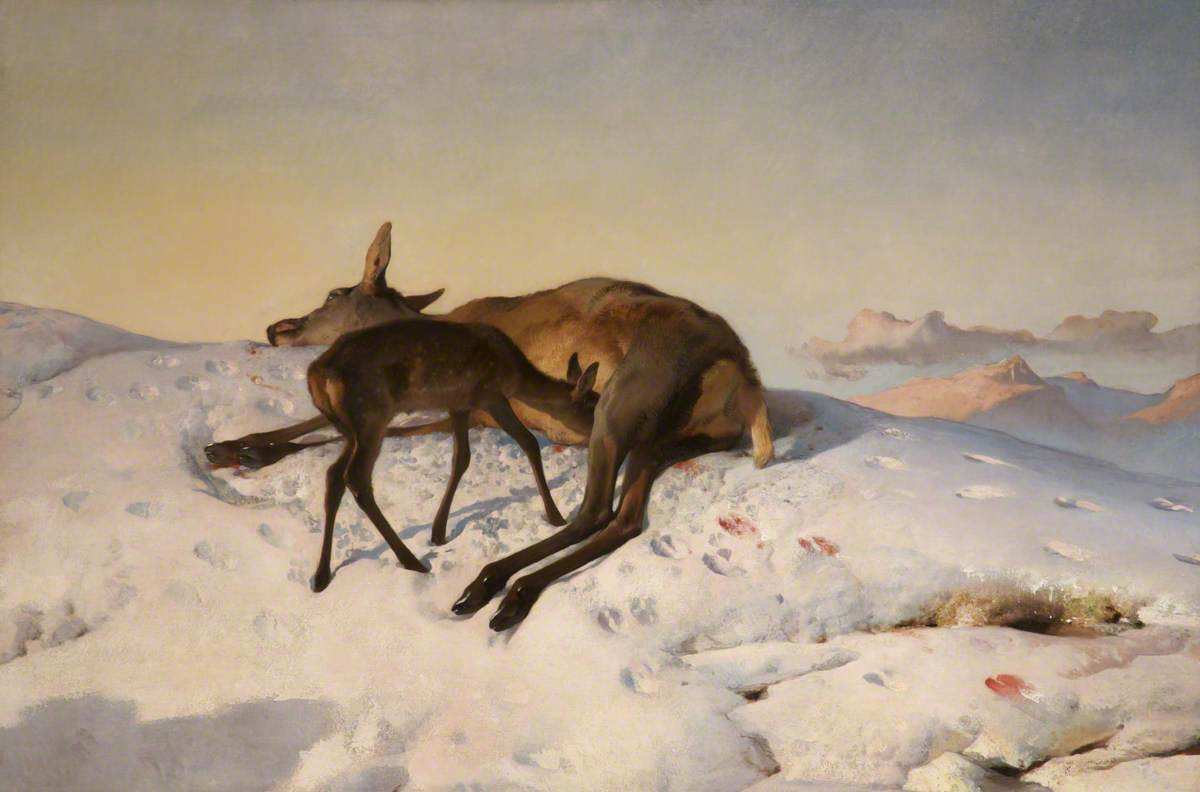
- Artist: Edwin Landseer
- Year: 1848
- Type: Oil on canvas, genre painting
- Dimensions: 121 cm × 182 cm (48 in × 72 in)
- Location: Bury Art Museum; Greater Manchester

A Random Shot is an 1848 oil painting by the British artist Edwin Landseer. It depicts a snow-covered mountaintop in the Highlands of Scotland, where a deer struck by a random shot of a hunter has managed to reach before dying. A fawn nuzzles against her forlornly.

Deers as victims on man's aggression had been a theme running through Landscapes work during the decade. In this case it shows the violation of the unwritten rule that a female deer with young should never be shot. The artist drew inspiration for the painting from a passage in Walter Scott's The Lord of the Isles. Landseer added the snow at a late stage in order to heighten the emotion of the scene.

The work may have been commissioned by Prince Albert, but ended up in the collection of Thomas Wrigley. the picture was displayed at the Royal Academy Exhibition of 1848 at the National Gallery in London, where it attracted a great deal of attention. Today the painting is in the Bury Art Museum in Greater Manchester, having been acquired in 1897.

== Bibliography ==
- Donald, Diana. Picturing Animals in Britain, 1750–1850. Yale University Press, 2007.
- Ormond, Richard. Sir Edwin Landseer. Philadelphia Museum of Art, 1981.
