= 1857 in art =

The following is a list of events from 1857 in art.

== Events ==
- May 4 – The Royal Academy Exhibition of 1857 opens at the National Gallery in London
- June 15 – The Salon of 1857 opens in Paris
- June 22 – The South Kensington Museum, predecessor of the Victoria and Albert Museum, is opened by Queen Victoria in London.
- The Sheepshanks Gift takes place. The art collector John Sheepshanks donates a large number of paintings to the nation, forming the basis of the collection of the new Victoria and Albert Museum
- Lewis Carroll meets John Ruskin and begins to associate with the Pre-Raphaelites. In the same year, Ruskin publishes his Political Economy of Art.
- Dante Gabriel Rossetti, William Morris and Pre-Raphaelite friends begin painting the Oxford Union murals; Jane Burden first models for them.

== Exhibitions ==
- May 5–October 17 – The Art Treasures of Great Britain exhibition is held in Manchester, one of the largest such displays of all time. Photographs are admitted.

== Works ==
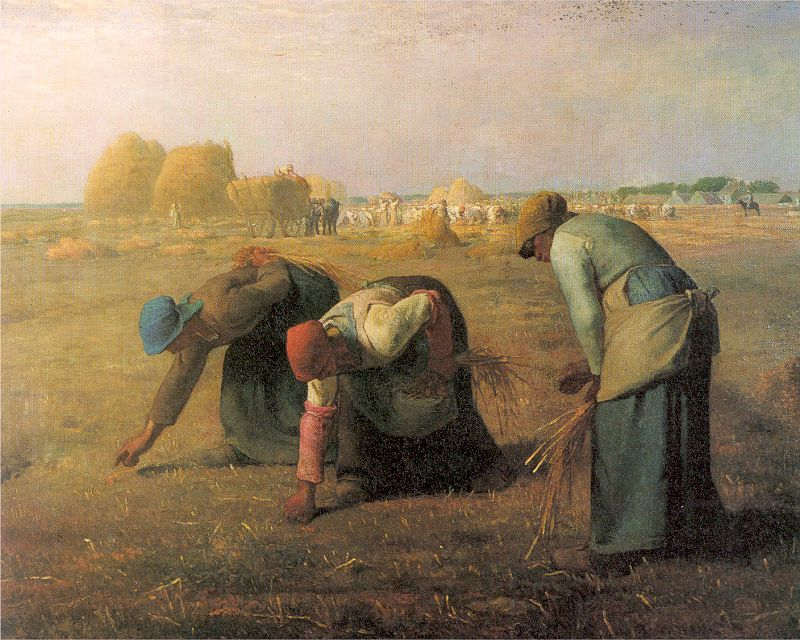
Millet – The Gleaners

- Jerry Barrett – Florence Nightingale Receiving the Wounded at Scutari
- Margaret Sarah Carpenter – Portrait of John Gibson
- Edward William Cooke – Morning After a Heavy Gale
- Jean-Baptiste-Camille Corot
  - Le concert champêtre (Musée Condé, Chantilly)
  - The Destruction of Sodom
  - The Willows of Marissel
- Gustave Courbet – Louis Guéymard as Robert le Diable
- Thomas Couture
  - The Supper after the Masked Ball
  - The Duel after the Masked Ball
- Augustus Egg – Beatrix Knighting Esmond
- Jean-Léon Gérôme –
  - The Duel After the Masquerade
  - Egyptian Recruits Crossing the Desert
- Francis Grant – Portrait of Daisy Grant
- Hiroshige – Prints from One Hundred Famous Views of Edo including Plum Park in Kameido and Sudden Shower over Shin-Ōhashi bridge and Atake
- Robert Howlett – Isambard Kingdom Brunel Standing Before the Launching Chains of the Great Eastern (photograph)
- Arthur Hughes – The Mother's Grave
- Gerolamo Induno – The Battle of the Chernaya
- Alexander Andreyevich Ivanov – The Appearance of Christ Before the People (begun 1837)
- Rudolf Koller – Cow in a Vegetable Garden (Die Kuh im Krautgarten)
- Edwin Landseer – Uncle Tom
- Benjamin Williams Leader – A Quiet Pool in Glenfalloch
- John Frederick Lewis – The Coffee Bearer
- Octave Penguilly L'Haridon – The Combat of the Thirty
- Daniel Maclise – Peter the Great at Deptford Dockyard
- John Everett Millais – A Dream of the Past: Sir Isumbras at the Ford
- Jean-François Millet (both Musée d'Orsay, Paris)
  - The Angelus (original version)
  - The Gleaners
- Philip Richard Morris – The Good Samaritan
- Emily Mary Osborn – Nameless and Friendless
- O. G. Rejlander – The Two Ways of Life (allegorical photomontage)
- Ernst Friedrich August Rietschel – Goethe–Schiller Monument
- David Roberts – The Piazza Navona at Rome
- Raden Saleh – The Arrest of Pangeran Diponegoro
- Abraham Solomon – Waiting for the Verdict
- Jozef Van Lerius – Portrait of Henriette Mayer van den Bergh
- Horace Vernet
  - Portrait of Marshal Canrobert
  - Portrait of Pierre Bosquet
- Ferdinand Georg Waldmüller – Corpus Christi Morning
- Henry Wallis – The Stonebreaker
- August Wredow – Iris Takes the Fallen Hero to Olympus (sculpture, Berlin)

== Births ==
- February 12 – Eugène Atget, French photographer (died 1927)
- May 17 – Mary Devens, American pictorial photographer (died 1920)
- July 30 – Lucy Bacon, American Impressionist painter (died 1932)
- July 31 – Adolphe Willette, French illustrator (died 1926)
- September 10 – Adolphe Demange, French portrait painter (died 1927)
- September 22 – Étienne Terrus, French painter (died 1922)
- October 23 – Juan Luna, Filipino painter (died 1899)
- November 18 – Stanhope Forbes, British painter of the Newlyn school (died 1947)
- November 21 – Columbano Bordalo Pinheiro, Portuguese painter (died 1929)
- December 7 – Uroš Predić, one of the top three Serbian Realist painters, along with Paja Jovanović and Đorđe Krstić (died 1953)
- December 8 – Anna Bilińska, Polish painter (died 1893)
- December 22 – W. W. Quatremain, English landscape painter (died 1930)
- December 23 – Georges Picard, French decorative artist and illustrator (died 1943)
- date unknown – Esther Kenworthy Waterhouse, English flower painter (died 1944)

== Deaths ==
- January 30 – Agostino Aglio, Italian painter, decorator, and engraver (born 1777)
- March 18 – Nathan Cooper Branwhite, English miniature portrait painter, watercolourist and engraver (born c.1775)
- May 1 – Frederick Scott Archer, English sculptor and photographic pioneer (born 1813)
- May 16 – Vasily Tropinin, Russian painter (born 1776)
- June 11 – Moritz Retzsch, German painter and etcher (born 1779)
- October 10 – Thomas Crawford, American sculptor (born 1814)
- October 14 – Johan Christian Dahl, Norwegian landscape painter (born 1788)
- October 27 – John Blennerhassett Martin, American painter, engraver and lithographer (born 1797)
- November 14 – Cornelis Kruseman, Dutch painter (born 1797)
- December 3 – Christian Daniel Rauch, German sculptor (born 1777)
- December 16 – William Havell, English landscape painter, part of the Havell family (born 1782)
- December 23 – Achille Devéria, French portrait painter and lithographer (born 1800)
- date unknown
  - Nicholas Joseph Crowley, Irish portrait painter (born 1819)
  - Luigi Rossini, Italian artist known for his etchings of ancient Roman architecture (born 1790)
