= Eliza Roberts (nurse) =

British nurse of the Crimean War

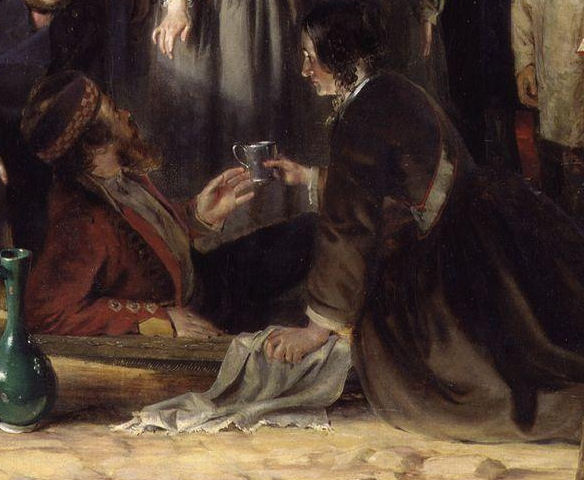
Eliza Roberts - detail of The Mission of Mercy: Florence Nightingale receiving the Wounded at Scutari (Jerry Barrett, 1857)

Eliza Roberts (1802–1878) was an English nurse who was among the first group of nurses to accompany Florence Nightingale to Scutari Hospital during the Crimean War. Nightingale regarded her as the best of her nurses and appointed her Head Nurse.

== Early career ==
Born in 1802 in Shadwell in East London into a working-class family, Roberts began her medical career in 1829 as an assistant nurse in men's surgery at St Thomas' Hospital in London. In 1840 she became a sister on George Ward, a men's surgical and accident ward. Dr John Flint South (1797–1882), a surgeon at St Thomas', thought that Roberts, by then a specialist in lithotomy and accident cases, had more clinical knowledge and experience of hospital matters than any one else, male or female, in the military hospitals in the Crimea. Robert Whitfield, the apothecary and senior resident medical officer at St Thomas' similarly described Roberts as the best nurse he had ever encountered, "one in a century of thousands, a thorough practical nurse". However, her management skills were poor, in 1848 her ward having the highest turnover of assistant nurses of any ward in the hospital. The 1851 census lists her as married, aged 47 and a Day Nurse resident at St Thomas'. In 1853, after twenty-four years service at St Thomas' and aged 51 years old, she retired to her home at Maida Vale owing to failing health.

== Crimean War ==
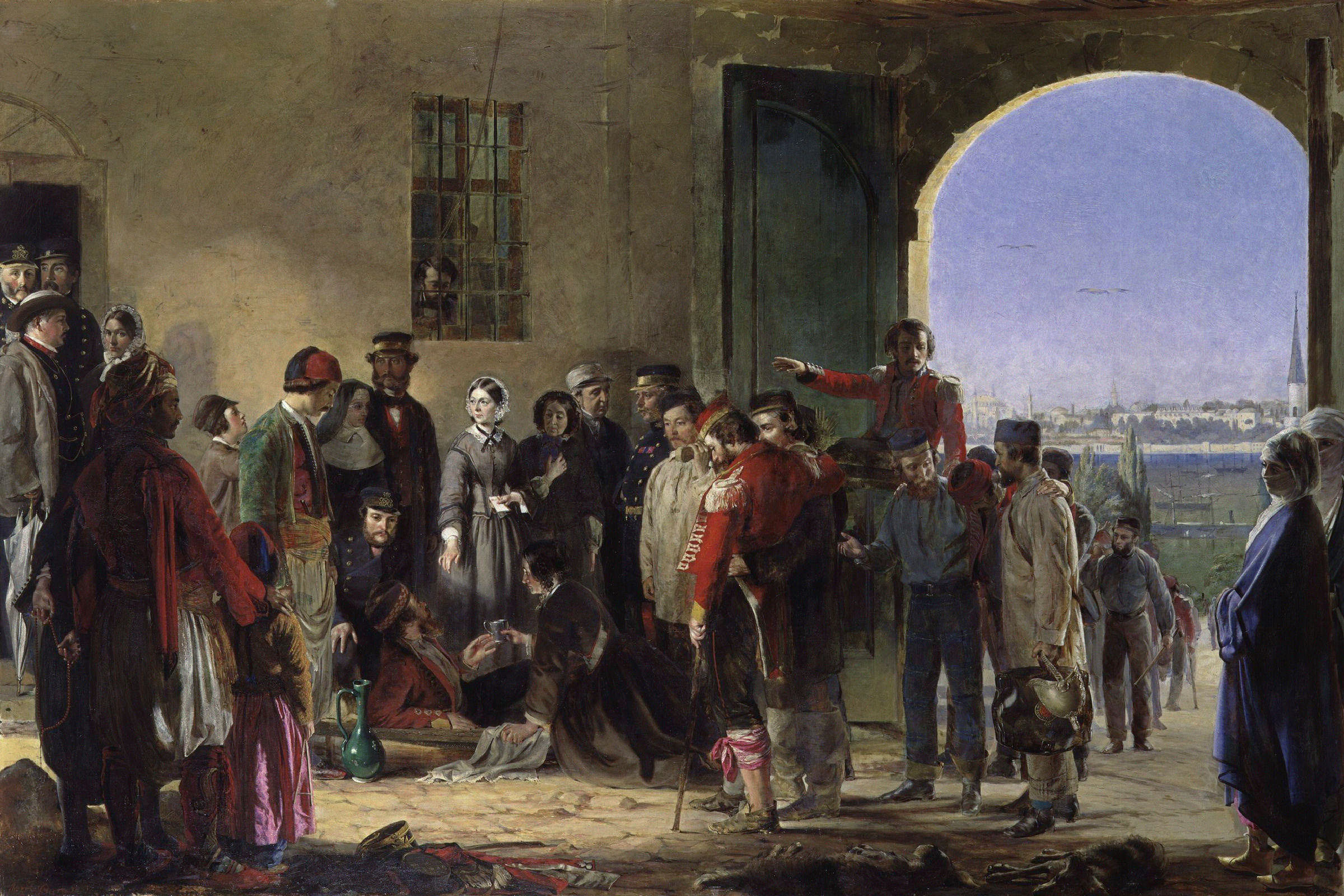
The Mission of Mercy: Florence Nightingale receiving the Wounded at Scutari, Jerry Barrett, 1857. Eliza Roberts is portrayed kneeling tending a wounded soldier

Her health had sufficiently improved that on the outbreak of the Crimean War in the following year she volunteered to join Florence Nightingale's team of 38 nurses travelling out to tend the sick and wounded at Scutari Hospital, having been recommended by Robert Whitfield of St Thomas' as "a thorough surgeon & a superior woman." She arrived at Scutari with Nightingale and the other nurses on 23 October 1854. Nightingale recognised her expertise and competence at once, and described Roberts after just ten days on the wards as being worth her weight in gold and appointed her as Head Nurse. Nightingale attributed Roberts' expertise to her many years of experience on the wards of St Thomas', writing of her, "Her total superiority to all the vices of a Hospital Nurse, her faithfulness to the work, her disinterested love of duty & vigilant care of her Patients, her power of work equal to that of ten nurses have made her one of the most important persons of the expedition." Roberts nursed Nightingale through her critical illness of May and June 1855, on one occasion refusing admittance to Lord Raglan, commander of the British troops in the Crimea, who had come to visit Nightingale during her sickness. It was only when Nightingale called out who the cloaked visitor was that he was allowed in.

Roberts had skills that few other nurses in the 1850s possessed as by that period dressers had taken over much that had previously been the responsibility of the surgical sisters. Nightingale was impressed with Roberts' skill as a dresser and reported that the senior medical officers agreed with her that she dressed wounds and fractures more skilfully than any of the dressers or assistant surgeons. The Dutch civilian doctor Peter Pincoffs (1815–1872), who served in the Crimea from April 1855 to April 1856, described Roberts as Nightingale's "clever aide-de-camp". Nightingale later stated that she believed Roberts would have made a first-class surgeon and physician and in consequence paid her £65 a year more than her other nurses, receiving a salary of £120 a year.

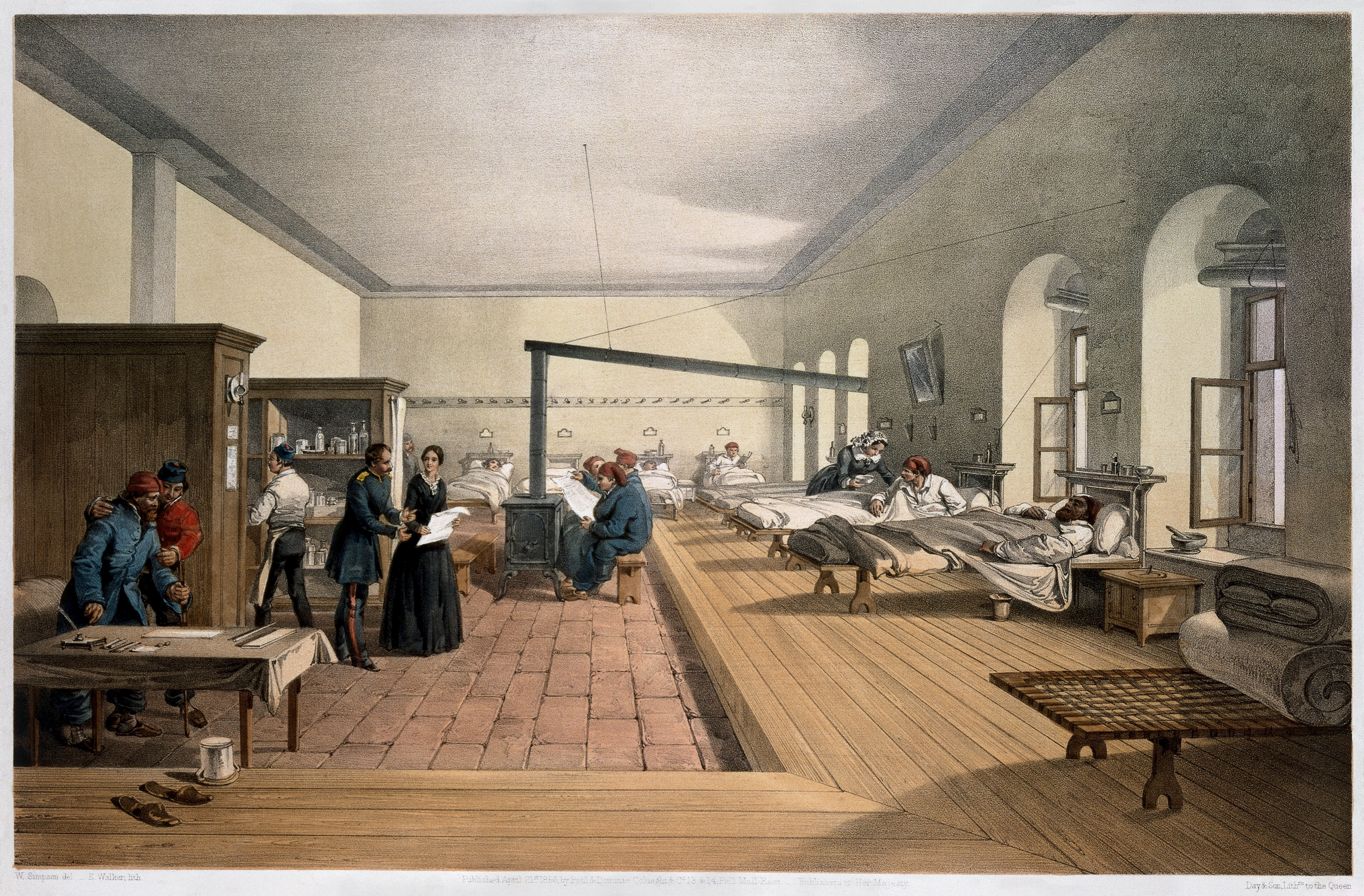
An 1856 lithograph of a ward in Scutari Hospital during the Crimean War

However, despite the importance of Roberts' work at Scutari her working-class origin at times made her a difficult employee. Her crude manners and bad language jarred with the upper-class Nightingale. In addition, Roberts was barely literate and talked constantly, repeating the same stories again and again; yet she grew angry with others who tired Nightingale with their own talk. Although sober, hard-working and chaste Roberts had a quick temper and was quarrelsome with the other nurses and proud of it, referring to herself as "Pepper". Yet Nightingale wrote that if Roberts was to leave Scutari she too would have to leave. Roberts was aware of Nightingale's dependence on her and whenever Nightingale reprimanded her for some failure she would threaten to resign and go back to England. Nightingale appreciated Roberts' nursing skills and experience over social etiquette and was therefore prepared to put up with Roberts' lack of social skills and manners. A letter from Nightingale to Roberts survives in which the former wrote asking Roberts to return immediately with one of her nurses, leaving the others "in charge of the nun" as "We have 250 wounded just arriving & I want you for a few hours to see after them."

The army surgeons in the Crimea were similarly impressed by her nursing skills. Thirty-six years after the Crimean War Nightingale recalled Roberts as a "splendid nurse and excellent woman". Roberts returned with Nightingale on 8 August 1856.

In the 1857 painting The Mission of Mercy: Florence Nightingale receiving the Wounded at Scutari by Jerry Barrett Roberts is the only figure doing anything useful as she kneels tending a wounded soldier. On her death in 1878 Eliza Roberts was buried in West Norwood Cemetery.
