= Canal of the Giudecca, Venice =

Painting by Edward William Cooke

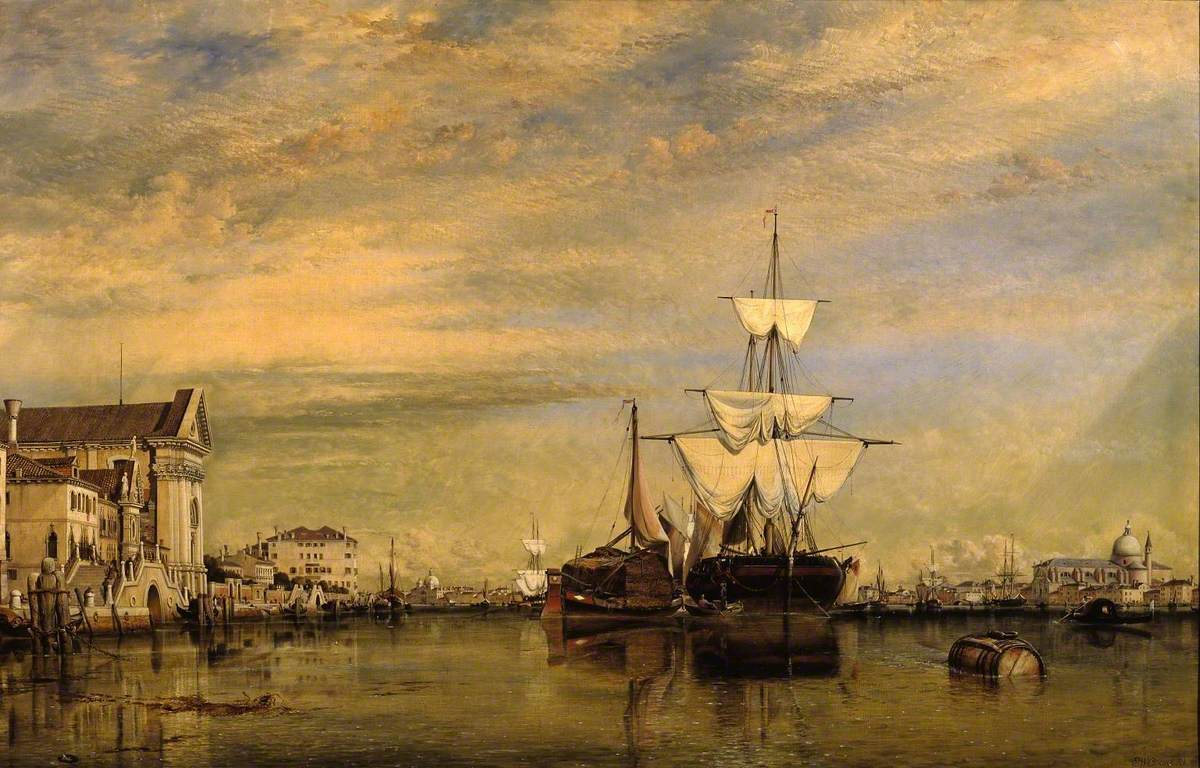
- Artist: Edward William Cooke
- Year: 1867
- Type: Oil on canvas, landscape painting
- Dimensions: 90.2 cm × 139.7 cm (35.5 in × 55.0 in)
- Location: Tate Britain; London

Canal of the Giudecca, Venice is an oil on canvas landscape painting by the English artist Edward William Cooke, from 1867. It depicts a view of the Giudecca Canal in Venice, including the Gesuati and Il Redentore churches. Strongly influenced by Clarkson Stanfield, Cooke was noted for his seascapes and produced a number of views of Venice.

The painting was displayed at the Royal Academy Exhibition of 1867 held at the National Gallery in London. Today it is part of the collection of the Tate Britain, having been bequeathed by Henry Spencer Ashbee in 1900.

== Bibliography ==
- Munday, John. Edward William Cooke: A Man of His Time. Antique Collectors' Club, 1996.
- Small, Lisa & Buron, Melissa E.. Monet and Venice. Rizzoli International Publications, 2025.
