= Naval Review in Honour of the Shah of Persia =

Painting by Edward William Cooke

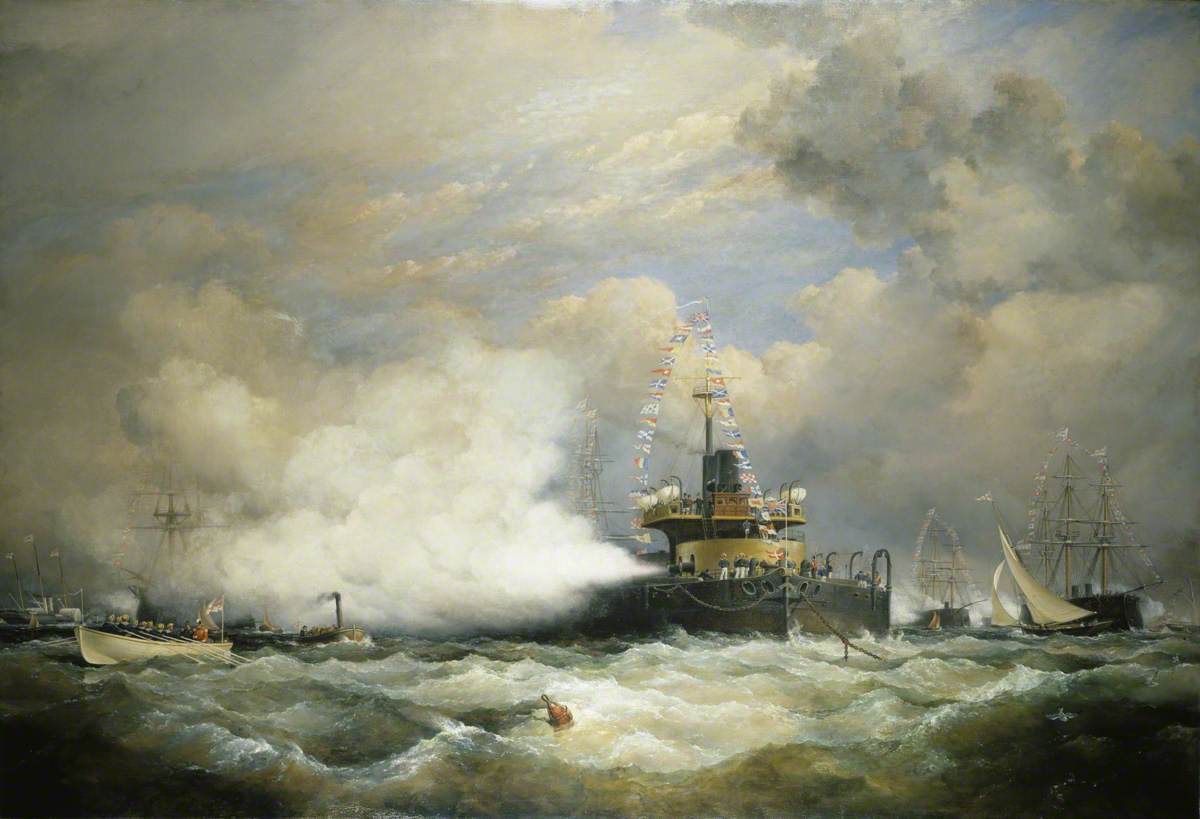
- Artist: Edward William Cooke
- Year: 1875
- Type: Oil on canvas, maritime painting
- Dimensions: 139.7 cm × 205.8 cm (55.0 in × 81.0 in)
- Location: National Maritime Museum, London

Naval Review in Honour of the Shah of Persia is an 1875 oil painting by the British artist Edward William Cooke. A seascape, it depicts the scene at Spithead on 23 June 1873 when a naval review was held during the State Visit of Naser al-Din Shah Qajar the Shah of Persia. The main focus in the paintings is the Turret ship HMS Devastation, while on the far left is the royal yacht Victoria and Albert. The picture's full title is HM Turret Ship 'Devastation' at Spithead on the Occasion of the Naval Review in Honour of the Shah of Persia, 23rd June 1873.

Edward William Cooke had been strongly influenced by Clarkson Stanfield and had succeeded him as Britain's leading marine painter. He may have been inspired to produce this work by a call by the First Lord of the Admiralty George Goschen who called for paintings of more modern ships. The painting was displayed at the Royal Academy Exhibition of 1875 held at Burlington House in London. Today it is part of the collection of the National Maritime Museum in Greenwich, having previously hung in the Naval Gallery at Greenwich Hospital after being donated by the politician Thomas Brassey.

== Bibliography ==
- Howgego, James L. Edward William Cooke: An Exhibition of Paintings, Drawings and Relics. The Gallery, 1970.
- Munday, John. Edward William Cooke: A Man of His Time. Antique Collectors' Club, 1996.
- Woodman, Richard. The History of the Ship: The Comprehensive Story of Seafaring from the Earliest Times to the Present Day. Lyons Press, 1997.
