= Queen Victoria's First Visit to her Wounded Soldiers =

Painting by Jerry Barrett

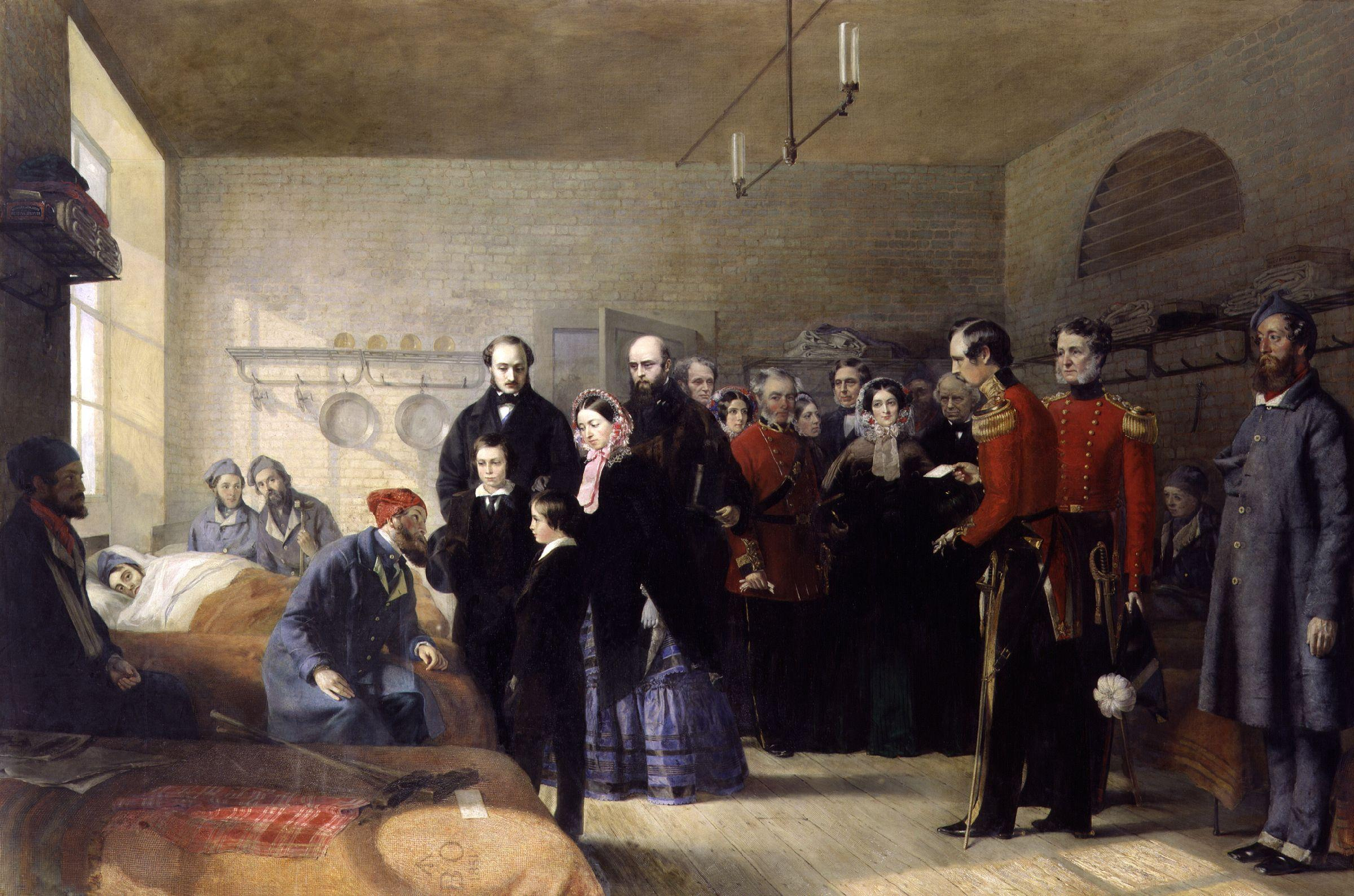
- Artist: Jerry Barrett
- Year: 1856
- Type: Oil on canvas, history painting
- Dimensions: 141.9 cm × 213.3 cm (55.9 in × 84.0 in)
- Location: National Portrait Gallery, London

Queen Victoria's First Visit to her Wounded Soldiers is an 1856 history painting by the Irish artist Jerry Barrett. It depicts a visit paid on 3 March 1855 by Queen Victoria to Fort Pitt in Chatham to see the wounded British Army soldiers of the Crimean War. She is accompanied by her husband Prince Albert and her two eldest sons Albert Edward, Prince of Wales and Prince Alfred as well as senior military figures including the Duke of Cambridge, Charles Grey and Commander-in-Chief Lord Hardinge.

The art dealer William Agnew acquired the picture for £420. Today the painting forms part of collection of the National Portrait Gallery in London, having been acquired for the collection in 1993

== Bibliography ==
- Lalumia, Matthew Paul. Realism and Politics in Victorian Art of the Crimean War. UMI Research Press, 1984.
- Telotte, Leigh Ehlers . Victoria, Queen of the Screen: From Silent Cinema to New Media. McFarland, 2020.
