= Uncle Tom (painting) =

Painting by Edwin Landseer

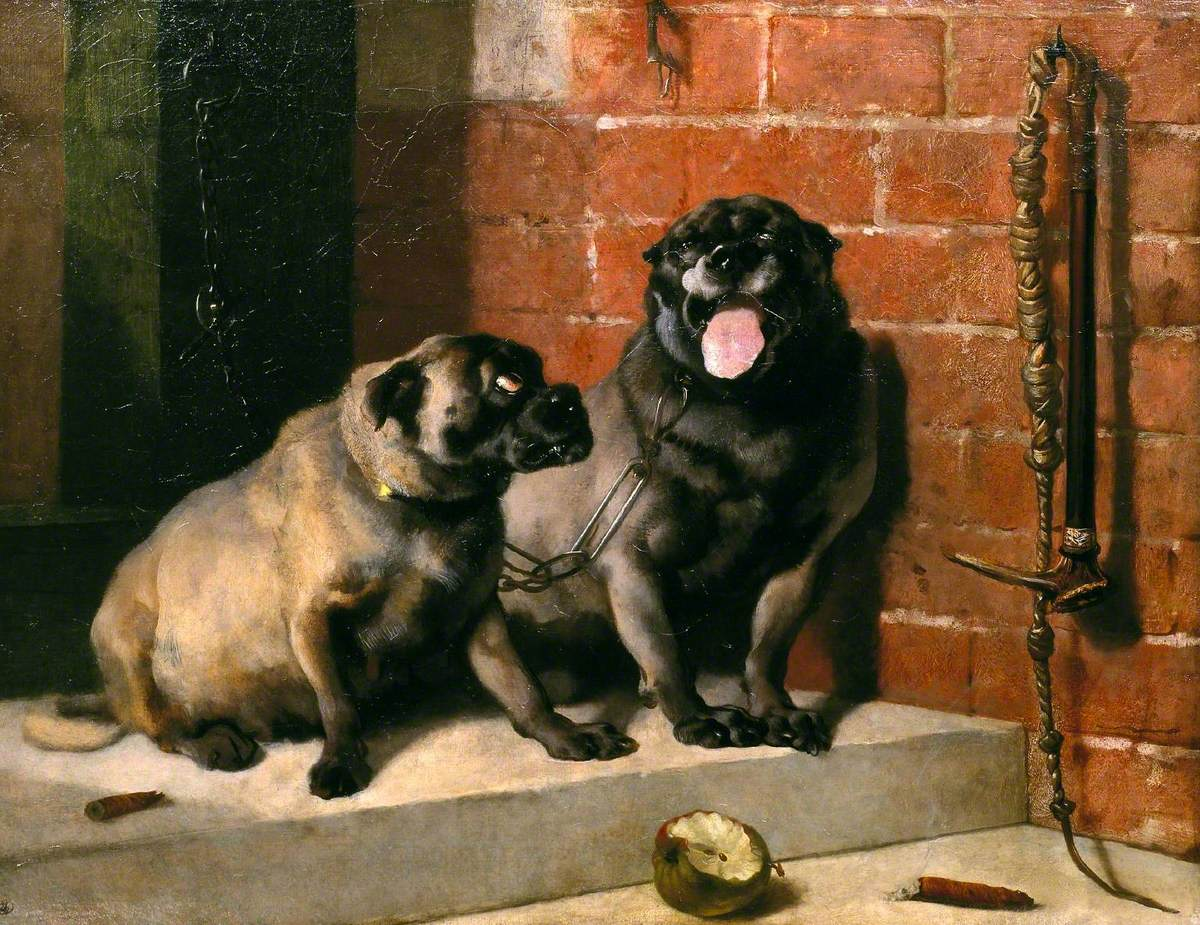
- Artist: Edwin Landseer
- Year: 1857
- Type: Oil on canvas, genre painting
- Dimensions: 91.5 cm × 70.7 cm (36.0 in × 27.8 in)
- Location: Tate Britain, London

Uncle Tom is an 1857 genre painting by the British artist Edwin Landseer. Inspired by Harriet Beecher Stowe's 1852 novel Uncle Tom's Cabin, it depicts two bulldogs about to be sold and likely separated. On a leash of chain and with a nearby whip hinting at brutality, it draws a connection between the mistreatment of these dogs and slavery in the United States. It is also known by the longer title Uncle Tom and his Wife for Sale.

The painting was displayed at the Royal Academy Exhibition of 1857 at the National Gallery in London where it attracted a great deal of attention. Today it is in the collection of the Tate Britain in Pimlico, having been gifted by Henry Tate in 1894.

== Bibliography ==
- Donald, Diana. Picturing Animals in Britain, 1750–1850. Yale University Press, 2007.
- McInnis, Maurie D. Slaves Waiting for Sale: Abolitionist Art and the American Slave Trade. University of Chicago Press, 2024.
- Ormond, Richard. Sir Edwin Landseer. Philadelphia Museum of Art, 1981.
