= Edward William Cooke =

English painter

Edward William Cooke RA FRS FZS FSA FGS
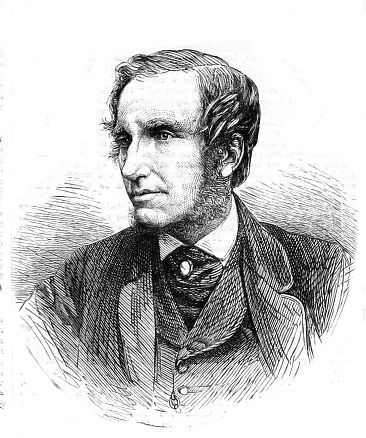
- Cooke in 1864
- Born: 27 March 1811; Pentonville, London
- Died: 4 January 1880 (aged 68)
- Education: James Stark
- Known for: Marine and landscape painting
- Elected: Royal Academy; National Academy of Design

Edward William Cooke RA FRS FZS FSA FGS (27 March 1811 – 4 January 1880) was an English landscape and marine painter, and gardener.

== Life and work ==
Cooke was born in Pentonville, London, the son of well-known line engraver George Cooke; his uncle, William Bernard Cooke (1778–1855), was also a line engraver of note, and Edward was raised in the company of artists. He was a precocious draughtsman and a skilled engraver from an early age, displayed an equal preference for marine subjects (in special in sailing ships) and published his "Shipping and Craft" – a series of accomplished engravings – when he was 18, in 1829. He benefited from the advice of many of his father's associates, notably Clarkson Stanfield (whose principal marine follower he became) and David Roberts. Cooke began painting in oils in 1833, took formal lessons from James Stark in 1834 and first exhibited at the Royal Academy and British Institution in 1835, by which time his style was essentially formed.

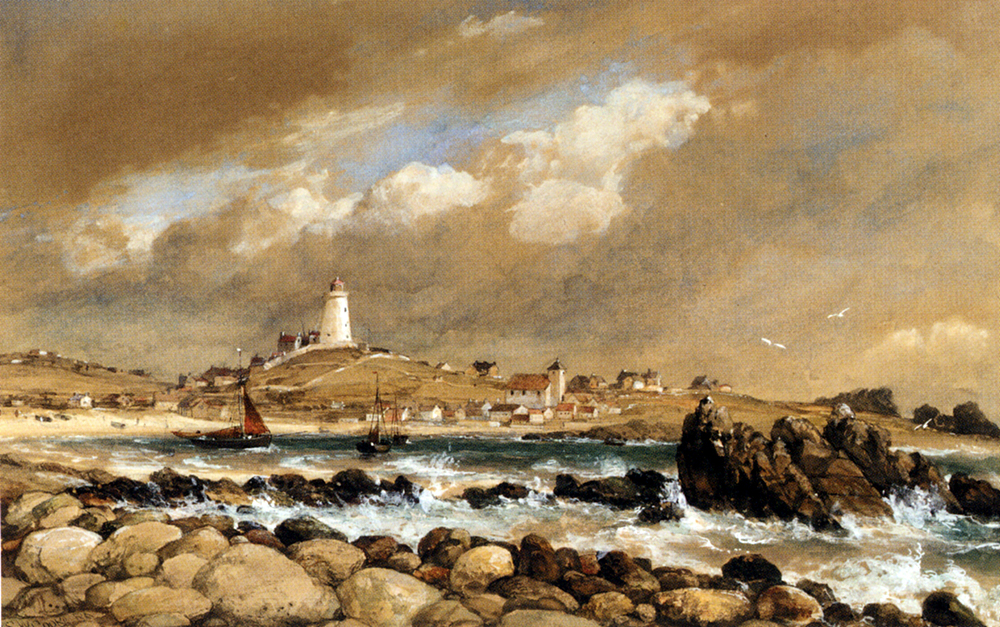
View of St. Agnes, Edward William Cooke

Remarkably few of his drawings of ships, boats, and coastal views appear in the childhood albums of Edward William Cooke since age of four. Many of his earlier drawings are seemed to favor Dutch pastoral landscapes and animal subjects. Numerous of his drawings are influenced by Nicolaes Berghem [Berchem], Paulus Potter, or Karel Dujardin.

He went on to travel and paint with great industry at home and abroad, indulging his love of the 17th-century Dutch marine artists with a visit to the Netherlands in 1837. He returned regularly over the next 23 years, studying the effects of the coastal landscape and light, as well as the works of the country's Old Masters, resulting in highly successful paintings. These included 'Beaching a Pink at Scheveningen' (National Maritime Museum, London), which he exhibited in 1855 at the Royal Academy, of which he was an Associate from 1851. He went on to travel in Scandinavia, Spain, North Africa and, above all, to Venice. In 1858, he was elected into the National Academy of Design as an Honorary Academician.

Cooke was "particularly attracted by the Isle of Wight, and on his formative visit of 1835 he made a thorough study of its fishing boats and lobster pots; above all he delighted in the beaches strewn with rocks of various kinds, fishing tackle, breakwaters and small timber-propped jetties."

He also had serious natural history and geological interests, being a Fellow of the Linnean Society, Fellow of the Geological Society and Fellow of the Zoological Society, and of the Society of Antiquaries. In the 1840s he helped his friend, the horticulturist, James Bateman fit out and design the gardens at Biddulph Grange in Staffordshire, in particular the orchids and rhododendrons. His geological interests in particular led to his election as Fellow of the Royal Society in 1863 and he became a Royal Academician the following year.

In 1842 John Edward Gray named a species of boa, Corallus cookii, in Cooke's honor.

In January 1864, Cooke donated £200 to the Royal National Lifeboat Institution (RNLI) towards the provision of a lifeboat at North Deal in Kent. The first boat to be stationed there, in service from 1865 to 1887, was named Van Kook at his request.

== Gallery ==
Hay Barge off Greenwich, 1835

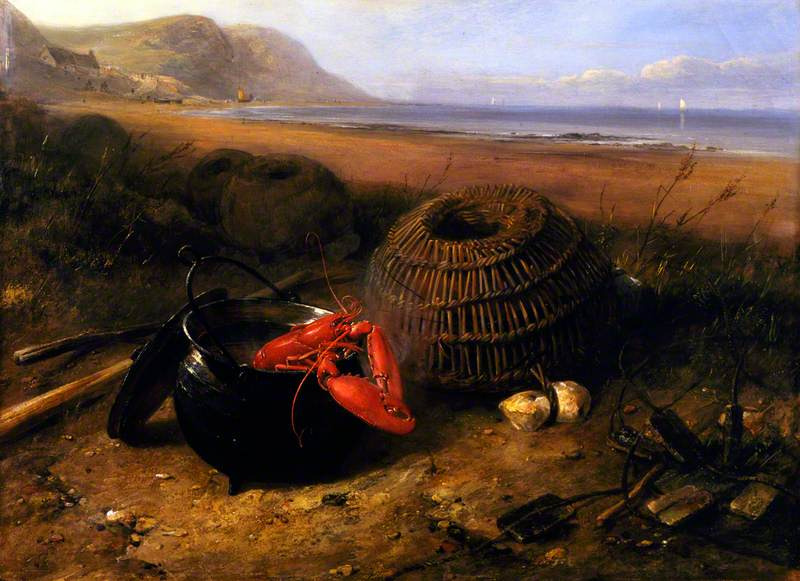
Lobster Pots, Ventnor, 1835

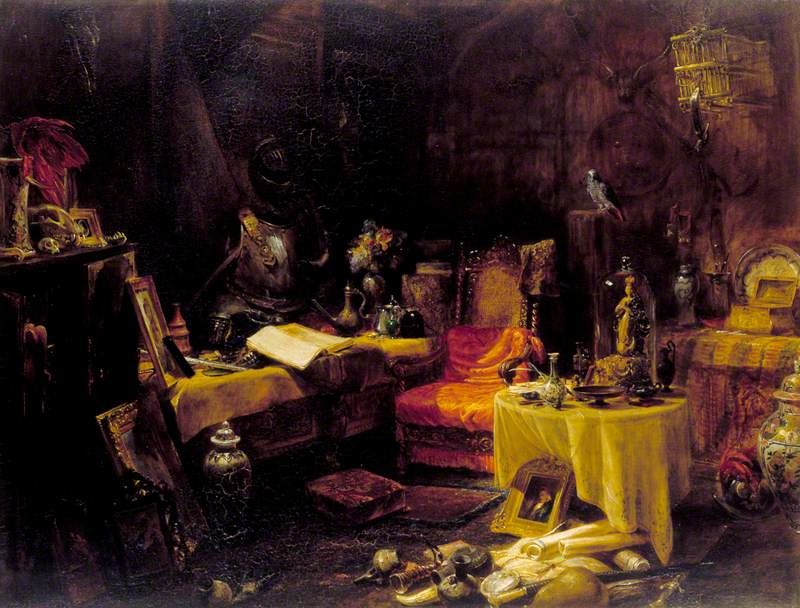
The Antiquary's Cell, 1835

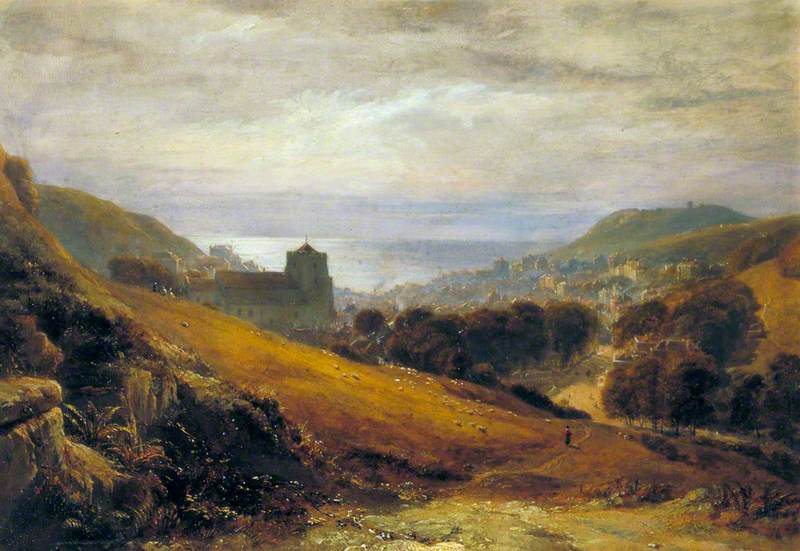
Old Hastings, 1835

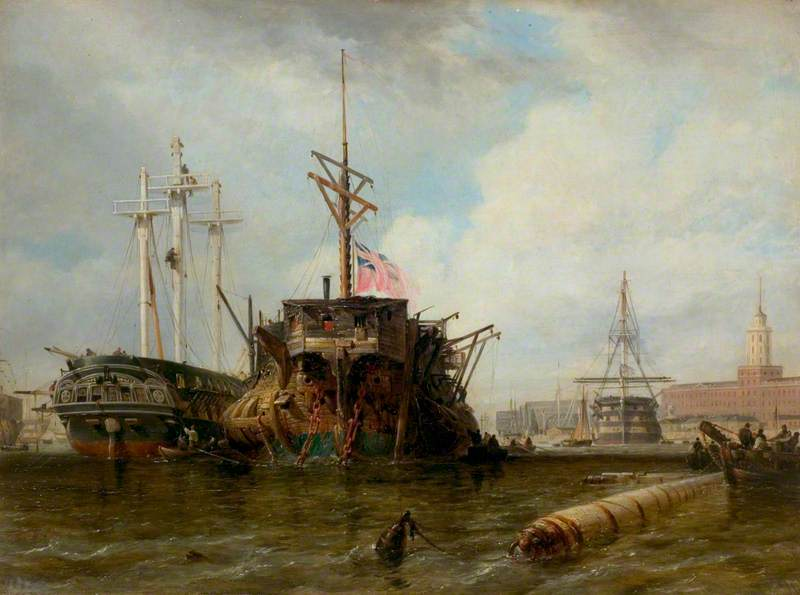
Portsmouth Harbour, The Hulks, 1836

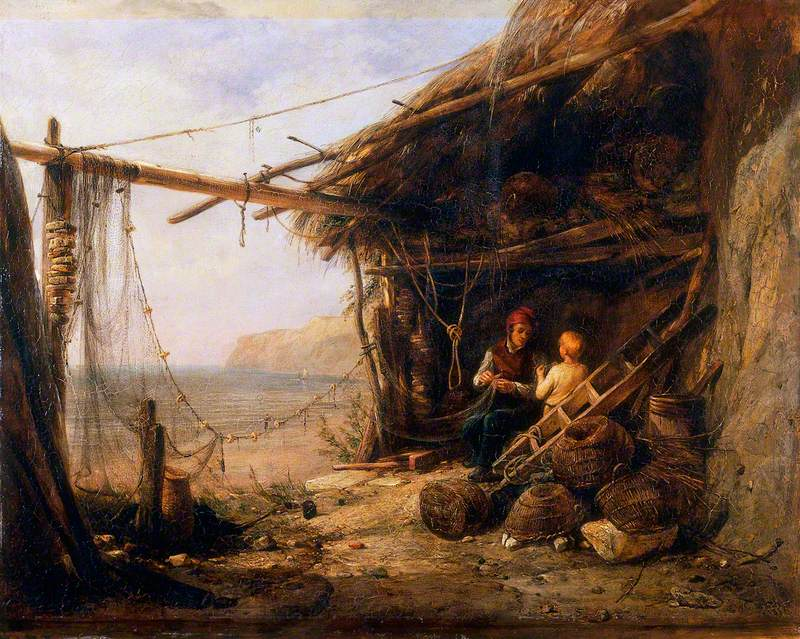
Mending the Bait-Nets, Shanklin, 1836

Semaphore at Portsmouth, 1836

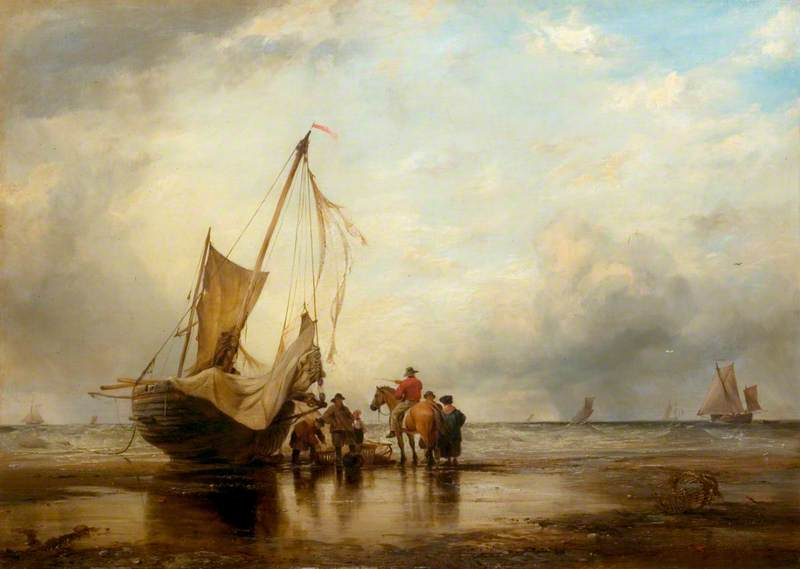
Brighton Sands, 1837

Vessels on the Sands at Hastings, 1837

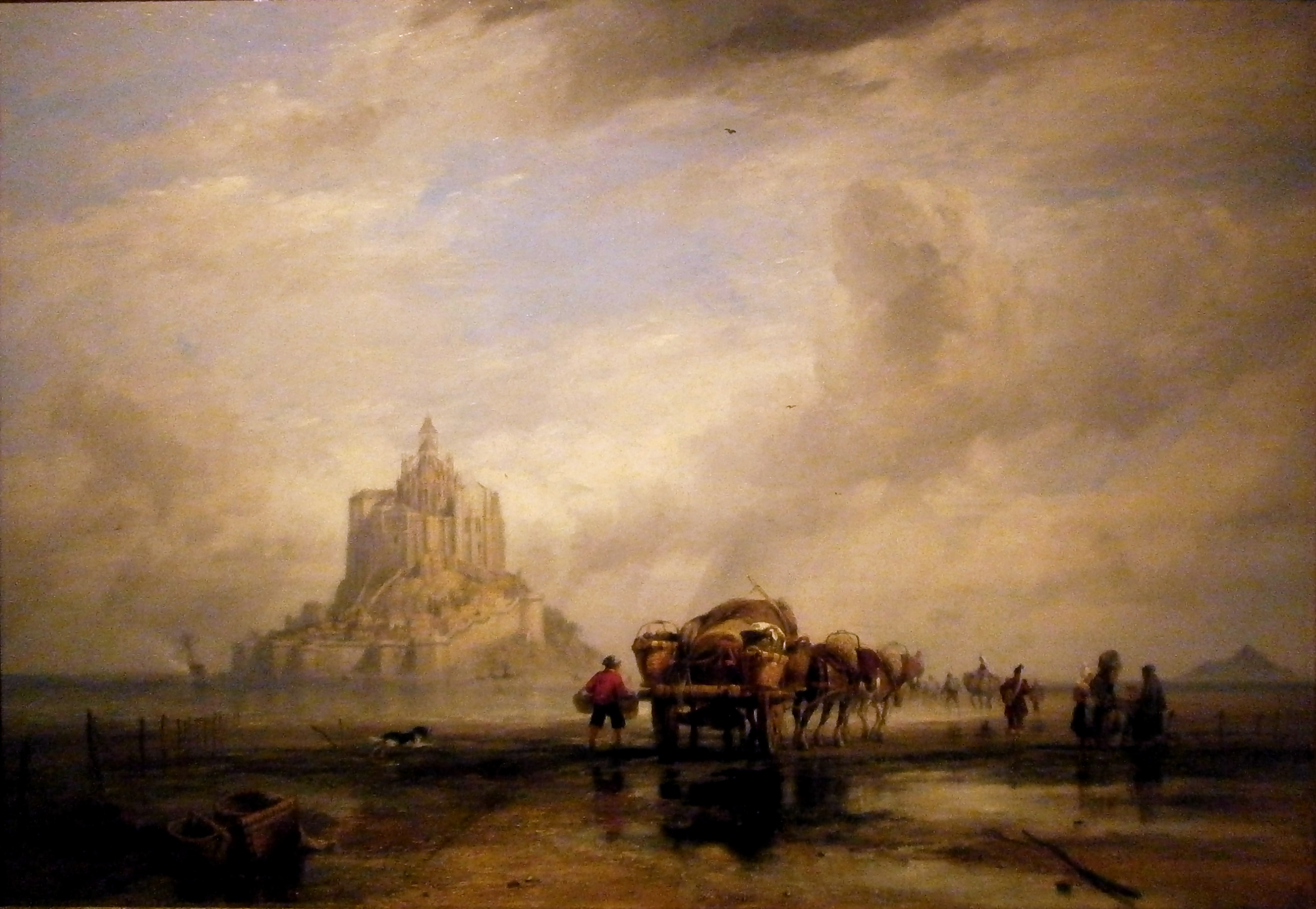
Mont Saint Michel, Normandy, 1838

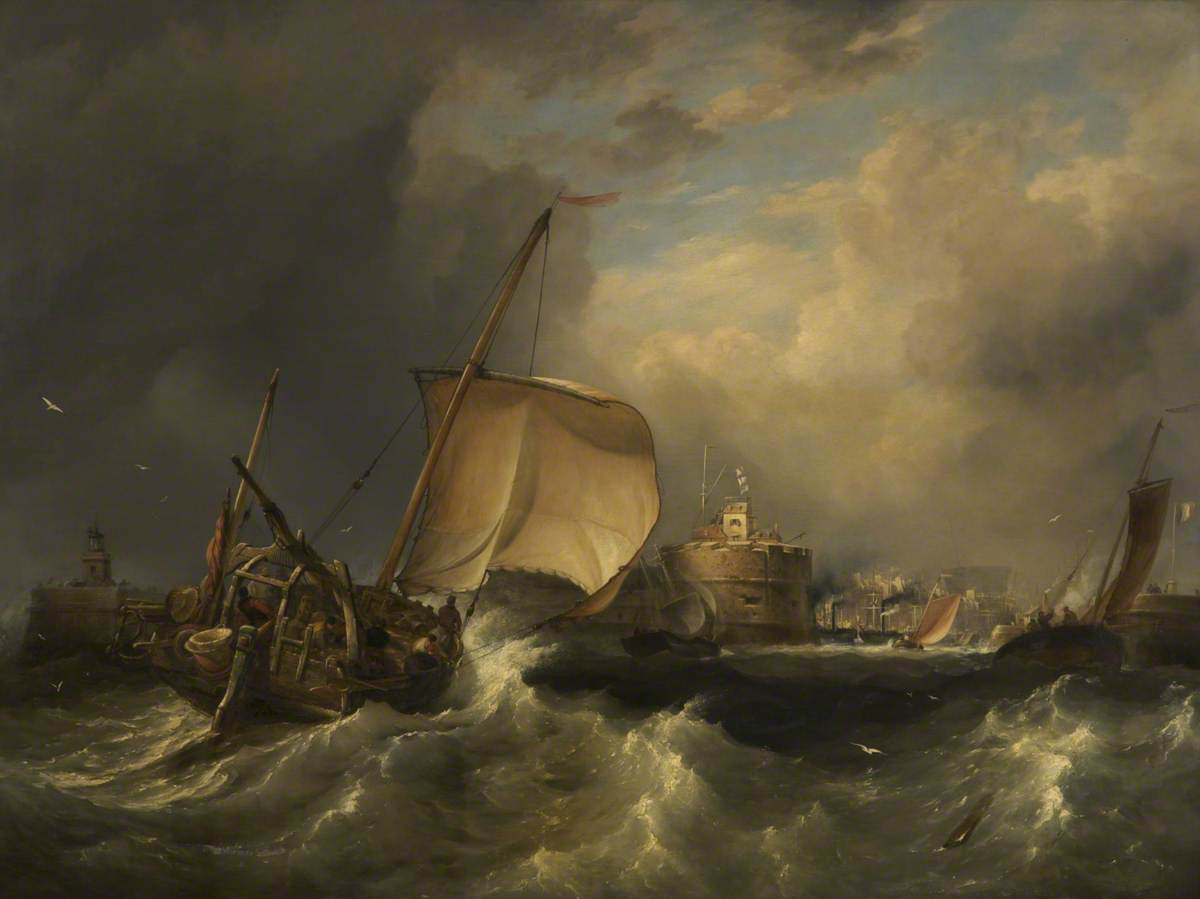
Off the Port of Havre, 1840

Mont St Michel Shrimpers, 1842

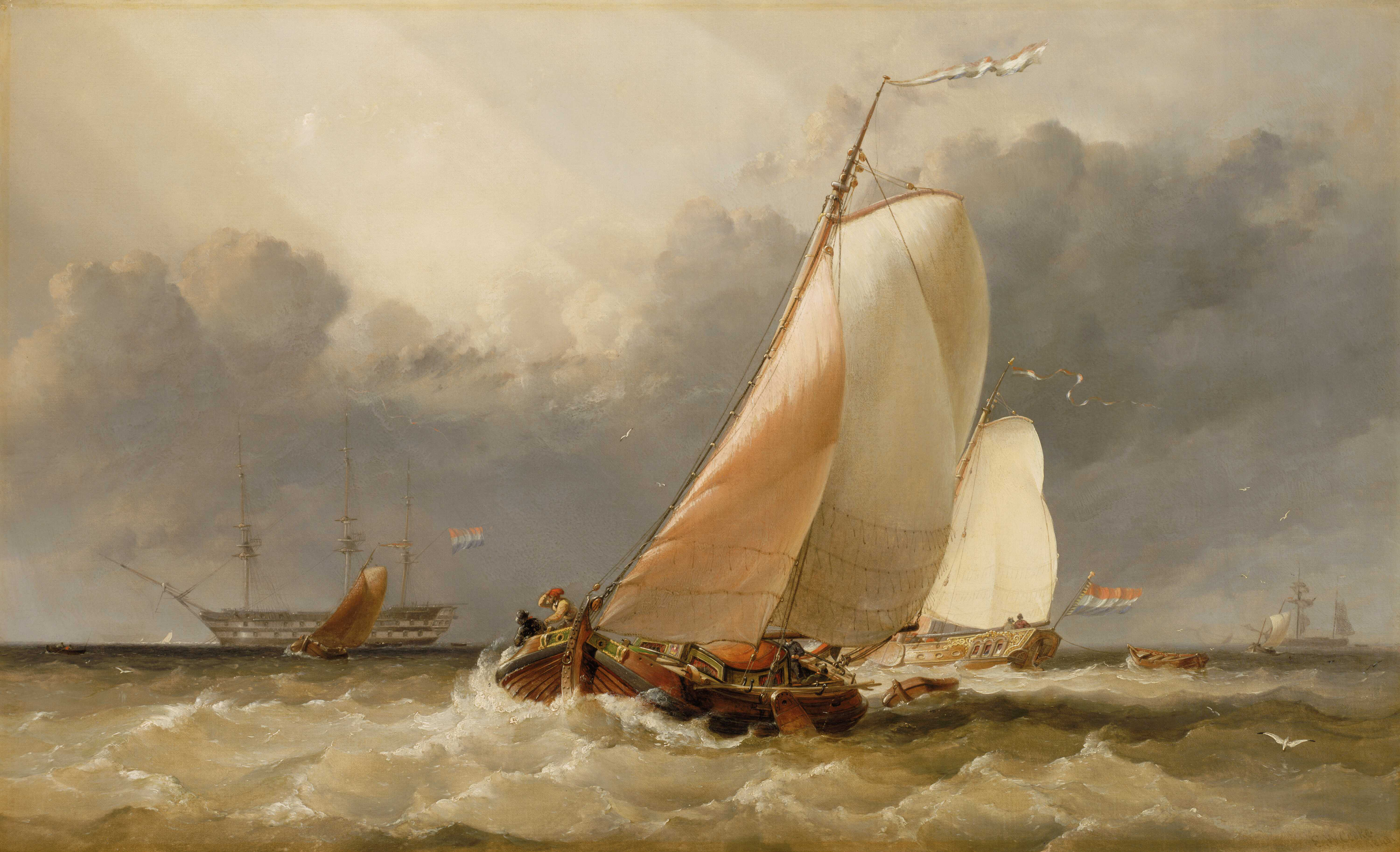
Dutch Yachting on the Zuider Zee, 1848

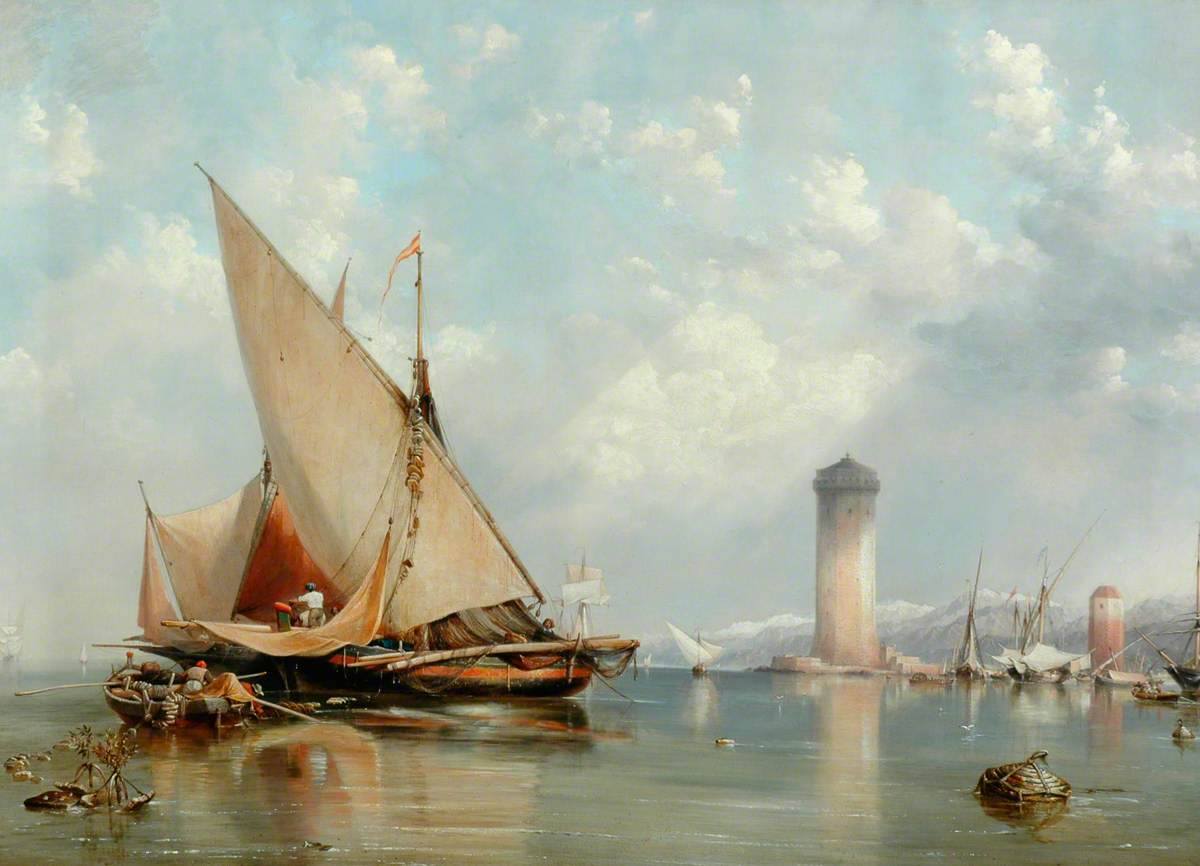
Off the Coast of Leghorn, 1848

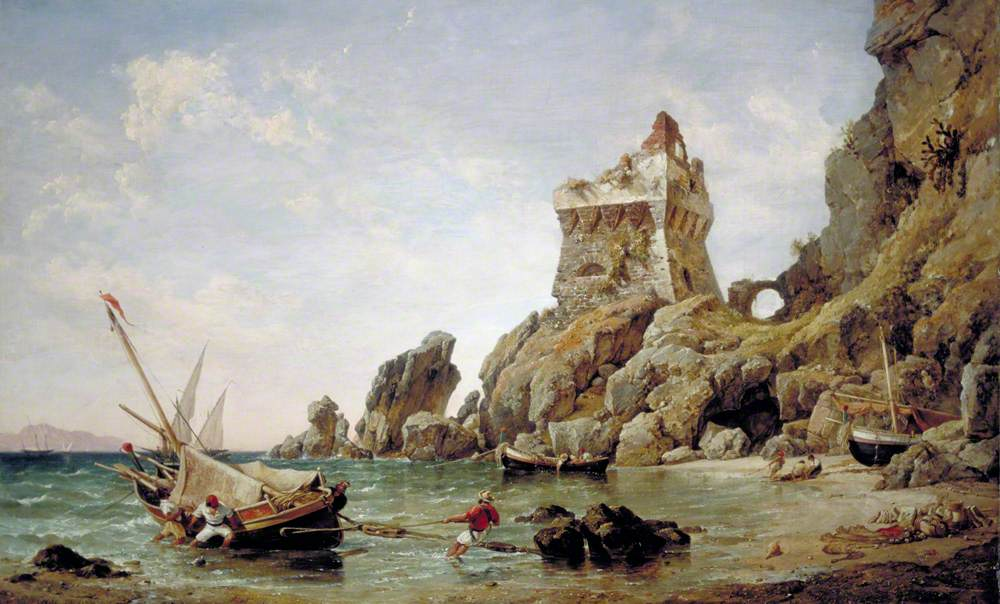
Salerno, Italy, 1849

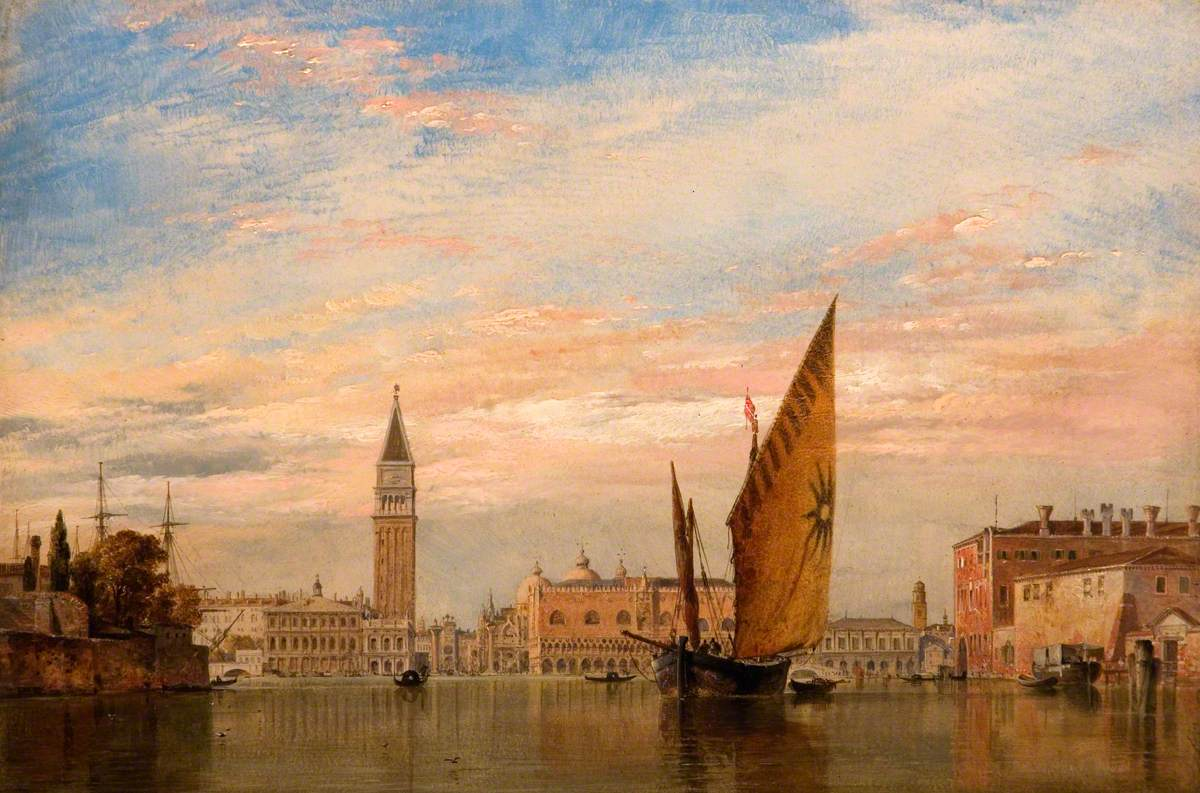
On the Bacino di San Marco, Venice, 1851

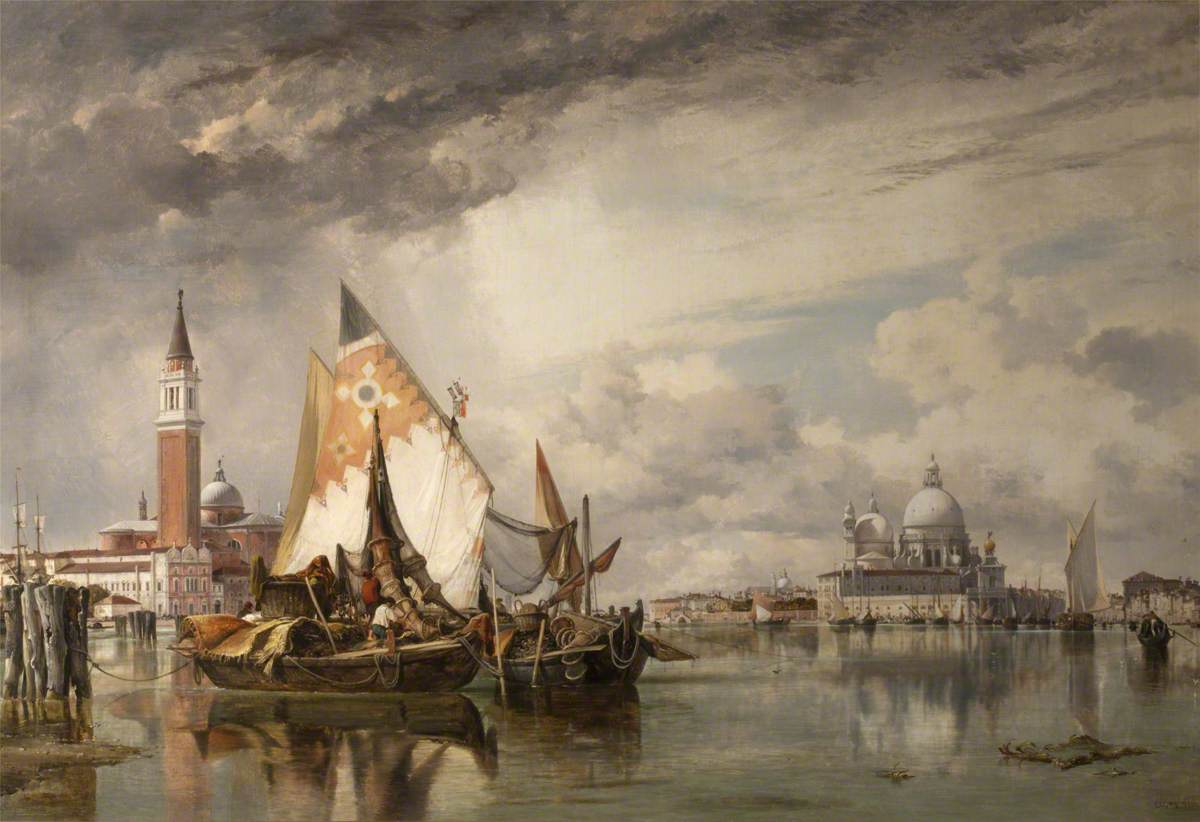
San Giorgio Maggiore and the Salute, Venice, 1852

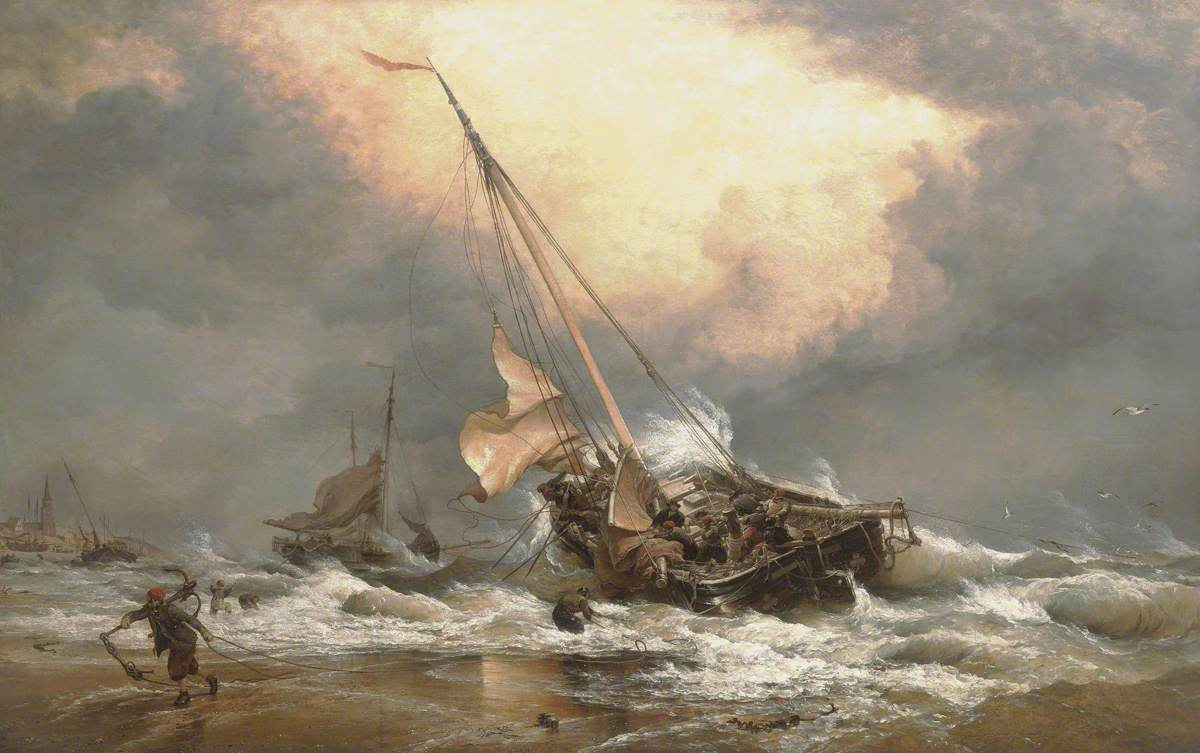
A North Sea Breeze on the Dutch Coast, 1855

Morning After a Heavy Gale, 1857

Bridge of Sighs, Venice, 1858

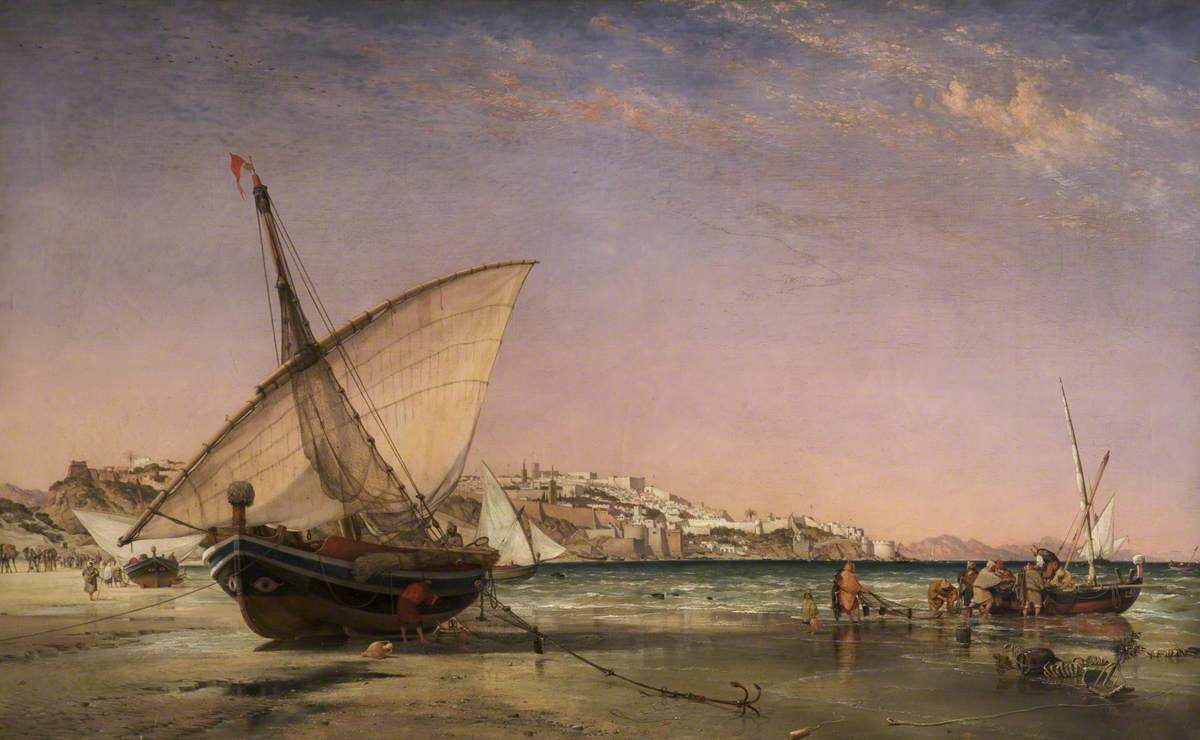
The Bay of Tangier, 1862

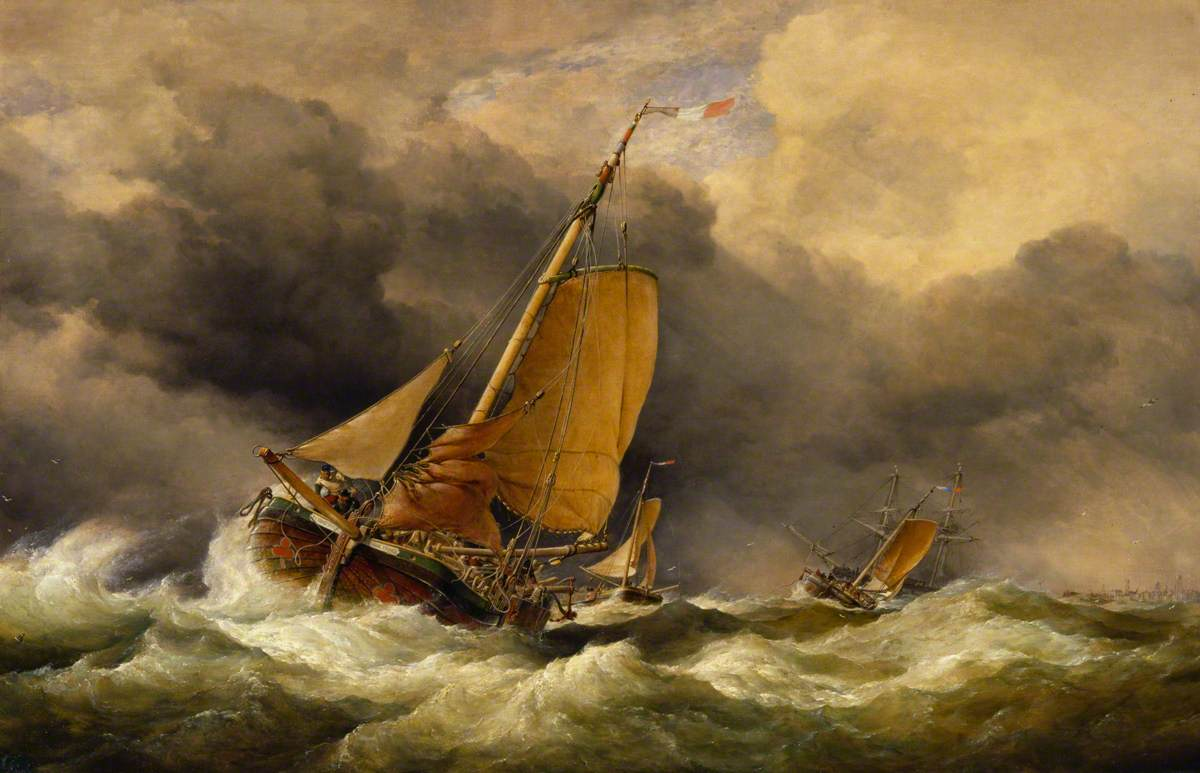
Scheveningen Pincks off the Coast of Yarmouth, 1864

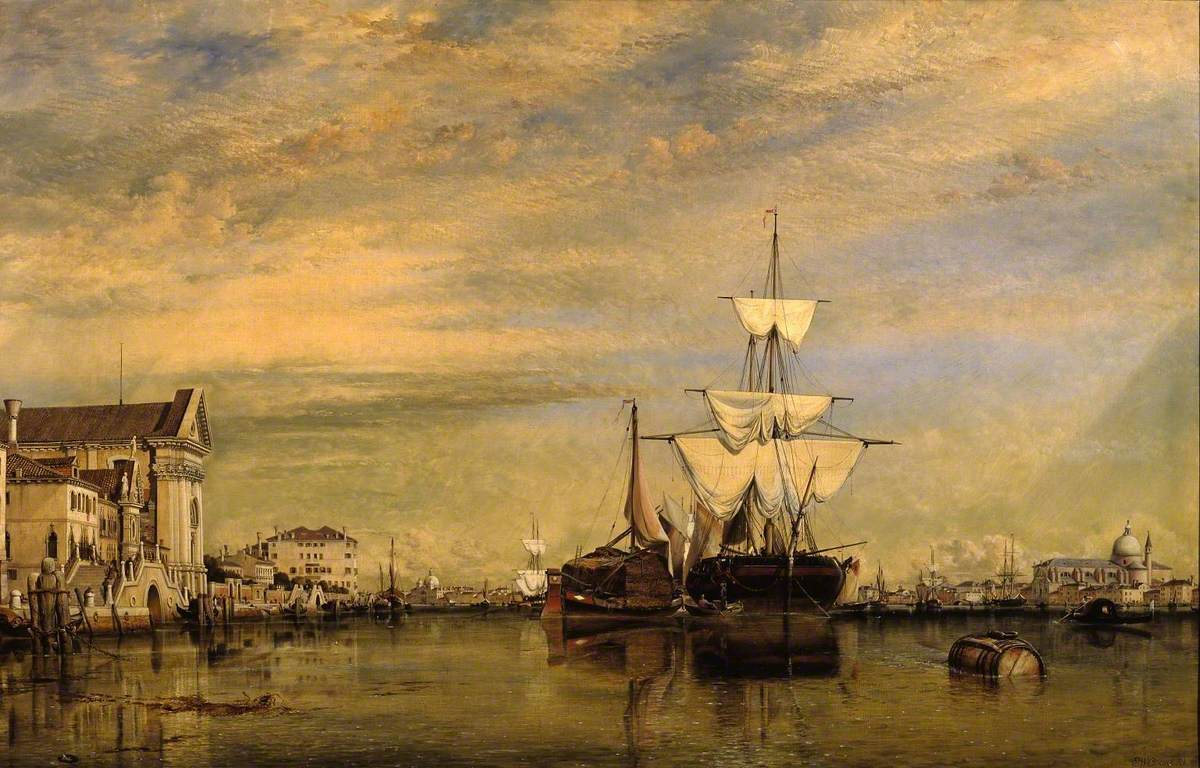
Canal of the Giudecca, Venice, 1867

French Sloop Entering the Harbour of Tréport, 1869

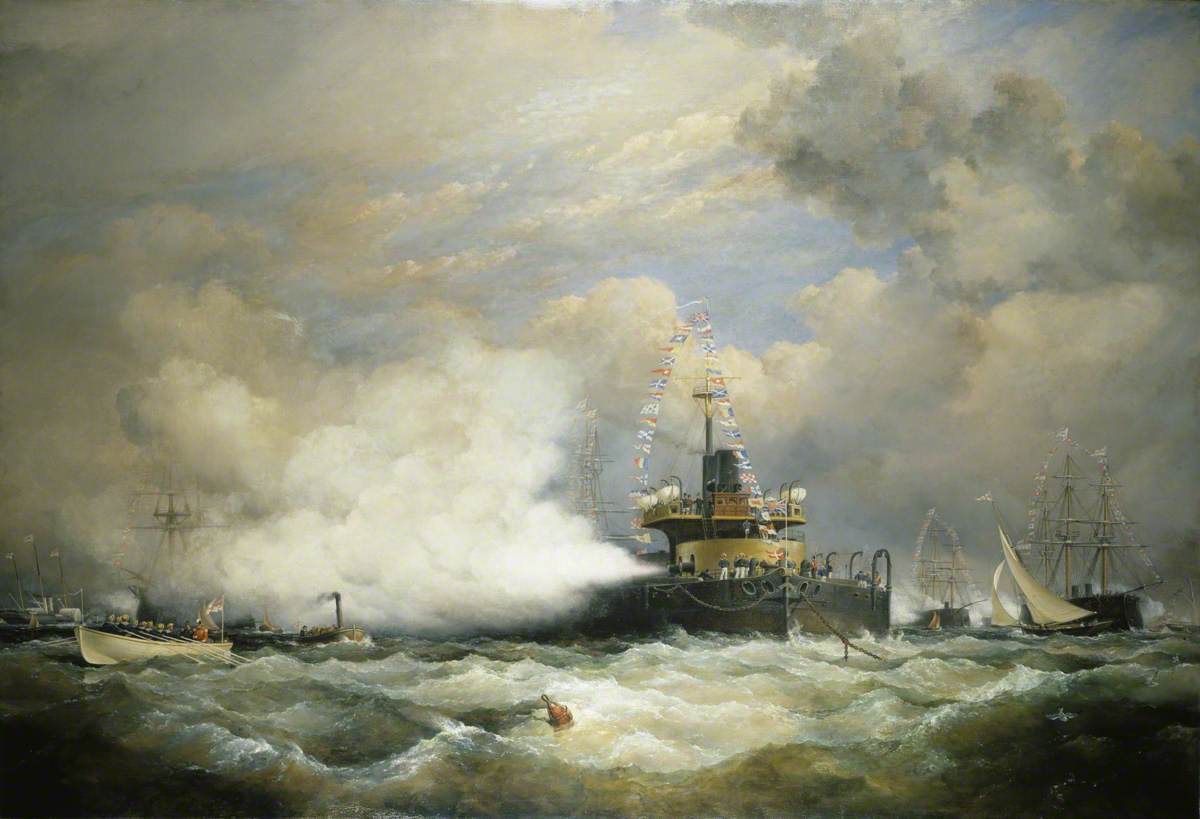
Naval Review in Honour of the Shah of Persia, 1875

== Publications ==
- Cooke, E.W. (1829). Fifty plates of shipping and craft London.
