= Morning After a Heavy Gale =

Painting by Edward William Cooke

- Artist: Edward William Cooke
- Year: 1857
- Type: Oil on canvas, maritime painting
- Dimensions: 94.6 cm × 126.3 cm (37.2 in × 49.7 in)
- Location: Dallas Museum of Art, Dallas

Morning After a Heavy Gale is an oil painting by the British artist Edward William Cooke, from 1857. A seascape, it depicts the morning after a heavy storm, depicting the pilot boat and lifeboat of Ramsgate, in Kent, going to the assistance of an East Indiaman floundering in the Goodwin Sands, in the English Channel.

Cooke was a follower although never a formal pupil of the marine painter Clarkson Frederick Stanfield. The painting was displayed at the Royal Academy Exhibition of 1857 at the National Gallery in London. Today it is in the Dallas Museum of Art.

== Bibliography ==
- Isham, Howard F. Image of the Sea: Oceanic Consciousness in the Romantic Century. Peter Lang, 2004.
- Payne, Christiana. Where the Sea Meets the Land: Artists on the Coast in Nineteenth-century Britain. Sansom, 2007.
- Van der Merwe, Pieter & Took, Roger. The Spectacular Career of Clarkson Stanfield. Tyne and Wear County Council Museums, 1979.
