= Florence Nightingale Receiving the Wounded at Scutari =

Painting by Jerry Barrett

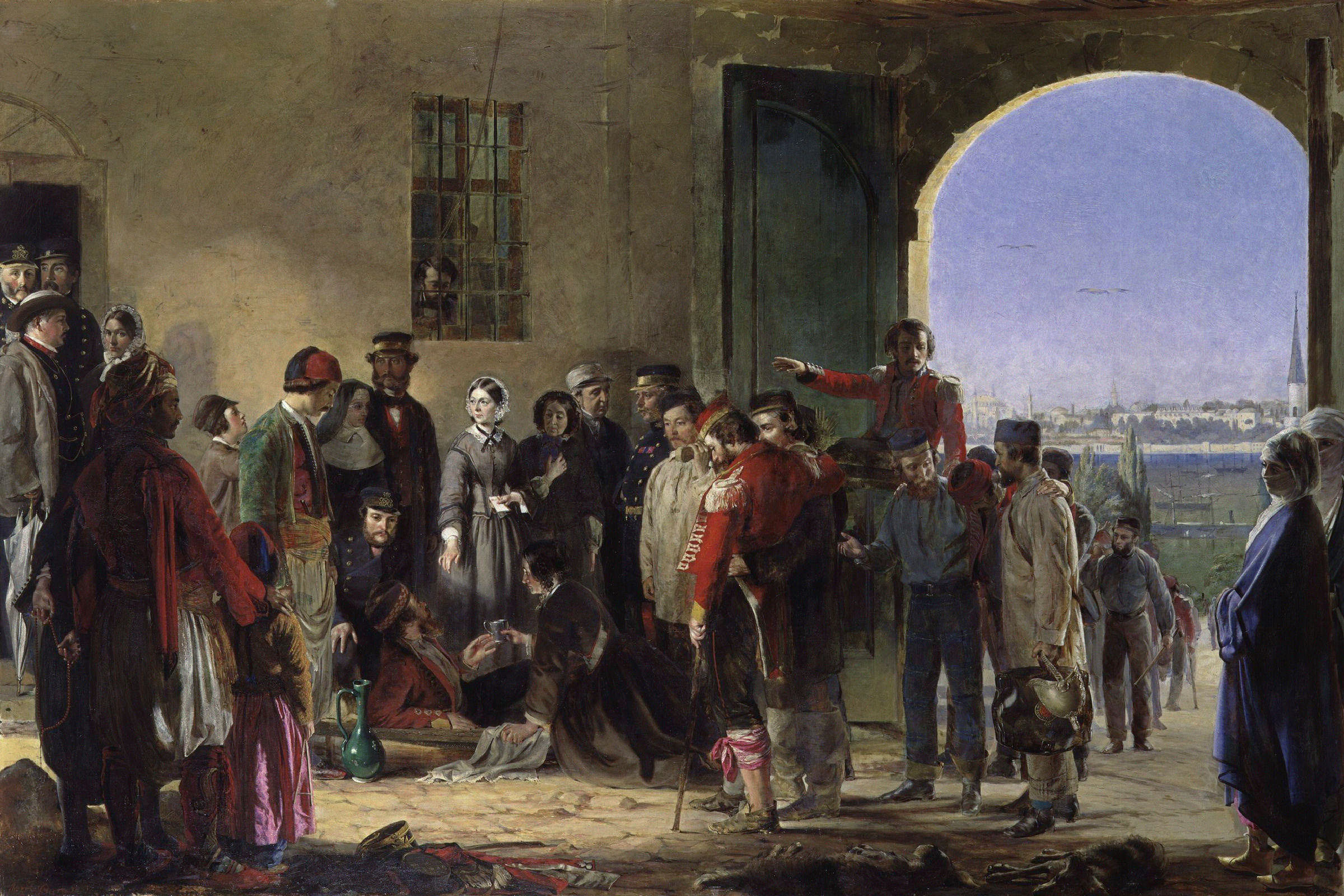
- Artist: Jerry Barrett
- Year: 1857
- Type: Oil on canvas, history painting
- Dimensions: 167 cm × 218.2 cm (66 in × 85.9 in)
- Location: National Portrait Gallery, London

Florence Nightingale Receiving the Wounded at Scutari is an 1857 history painting by the Irish artist Jerry Barrett. Also known as The Mission of Mercy, it depicts a scene at Scutari near Constantinople where Florence Nightingale and others established a hospital to treat British Army soldiers wounded in the Crimean War. Nightingale became known as "The Lady with the Lamp" for her work to improve nursing conditions for British troops. Today the painting is in the National Portrait Gallery in London, having been acquired for the collection in 1993.

Barrett had produced another work on a similar theme Queen Victoria's First Visit to her Wounded Soldiers the previous year, also now in the National Portrait Gallery.

== Bibliography ==
- Furneaux, Holly. Military Men of Feeling: Emotion, Touch, and Masculinity in the Crimean War. Oxford University Press, 2016.
- Kriegel, Lara. The Crimean War and Its Afterlife: Making Modern Britain. Cambridge University Press, 2022.
