= W. W. Quatremain =

English painter

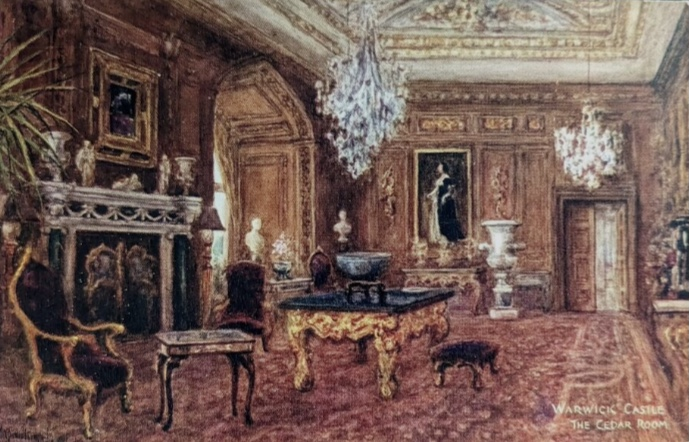
W. W. Quatremain, Warwick Castle the Cedar Room

William Wells Quatremain (22 December 1857 – 3 March 1930) was an English artist who painted many oil and watercolour landscapes of Britain, many of which were also published as postcards.

Quatremain produced a number of scenes from Warwickshire — like "The Ford, Kenilworth" and "Warwick Castle from the Avon" — and specifically from Stratford-upon-Avon, including "Shakespeare's Birthplace" and "Ann Hathaway's Cottage."
