= The Willows of Marissel =

Painting by Jean-Baptiste-Camille Corot

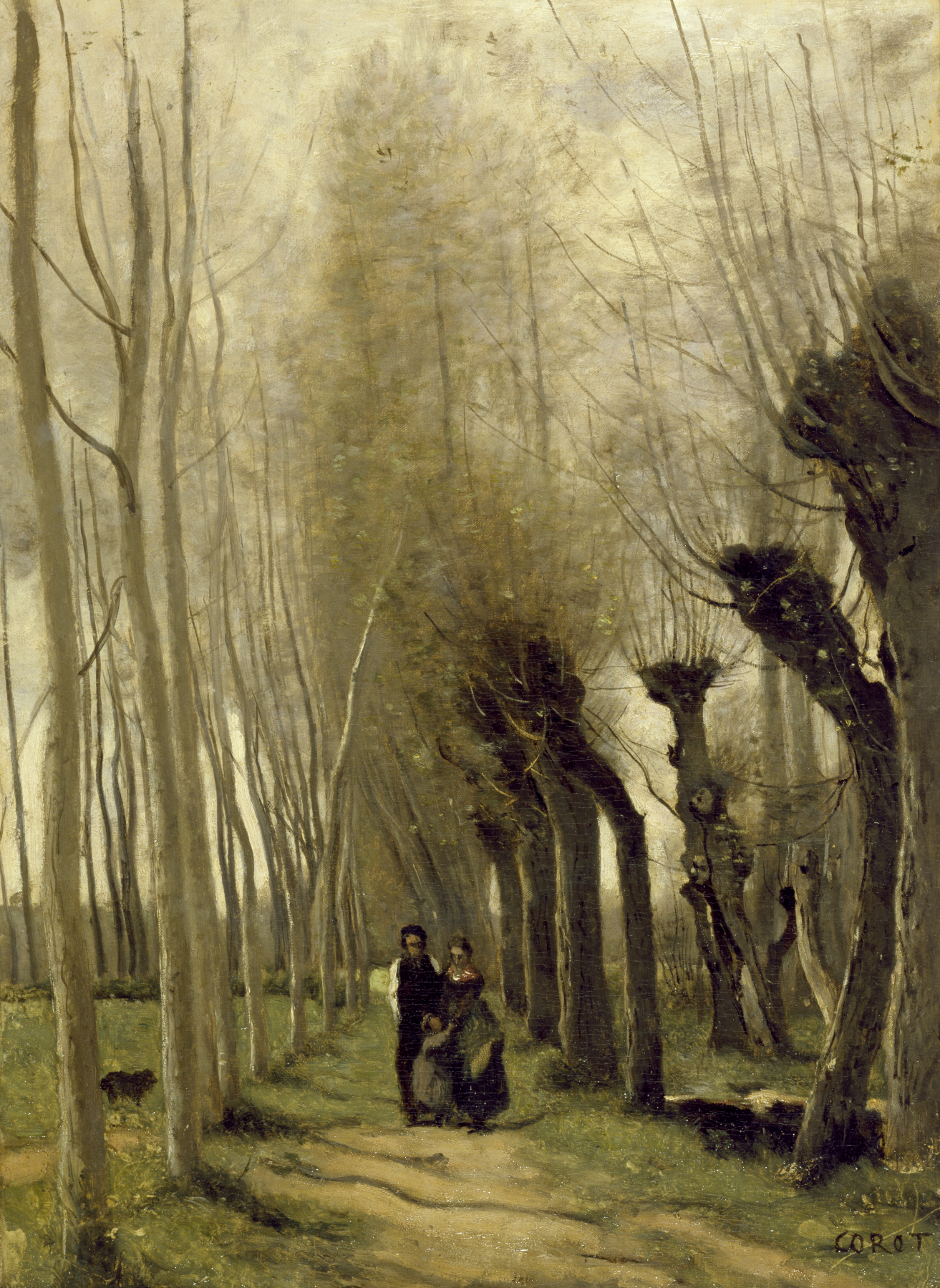
- Artist: Jean-Baptiste-Camille Corot
- Year: 1857
- Type: Oil on canvas, landscape painting
- Dimensions: 55 cm × 39.7 cm (22 in × 15.6 in)
- Location: Walters Art Museum, Maryland

The Willows of Marissel (French: Les Saules de Marissel) is an 1857 landscape painting by the French artist Jean-Baptiste-Camille Corot. It depicts a view near the village of Marissel in Oise with a couple, a child, and a dog walking through an avenue of willows and poplars. Located around forty miles from Paris, Corot visited Marissel in June 1857. Corot's works were associated with the Barbizon School of artists, which drew inspiration from John Constable. The picture is now in the collection of the Walters Art Museum in Baltimore, which acquired it in 1931 through Henry Walters. It has featured in a number of retrospective exhibitions about Corot.

== Bibliography ==
- Johnston, William R. The Nineteenth Century Paintings in the Walters Art Gallery. Walters Art Gallery, 1982
- Selz, Jean. La vie et l'œuvre de Camille Corot. ACR, 1988.
