= Jerry Barrett =

English painter

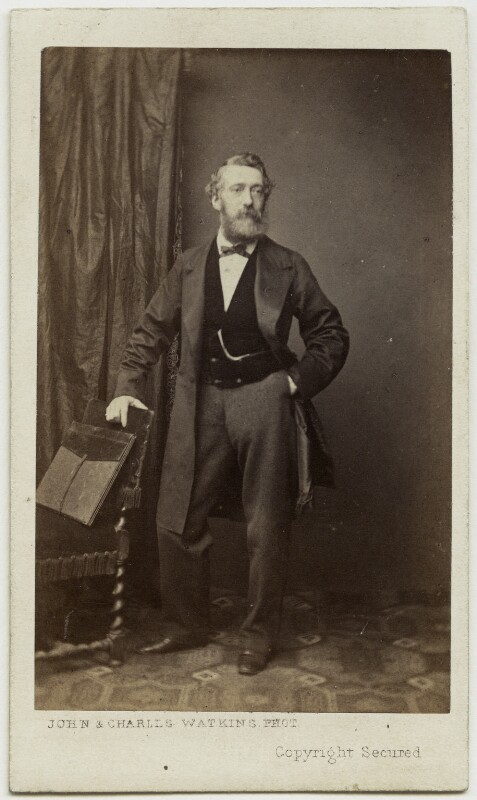
Jerry Barrett in 1860

Jerry Barrett (1824–21 January 1906) was an English painter of the Victorian era. His most notable work was the Crimean War depiction The Mission of Mercy: Nightingale receiving the wounded at Scutari (1858) which is in the National Portrait Gallery (London), paired with Queen Victoria's First Visit to her Wounded Soldiers.

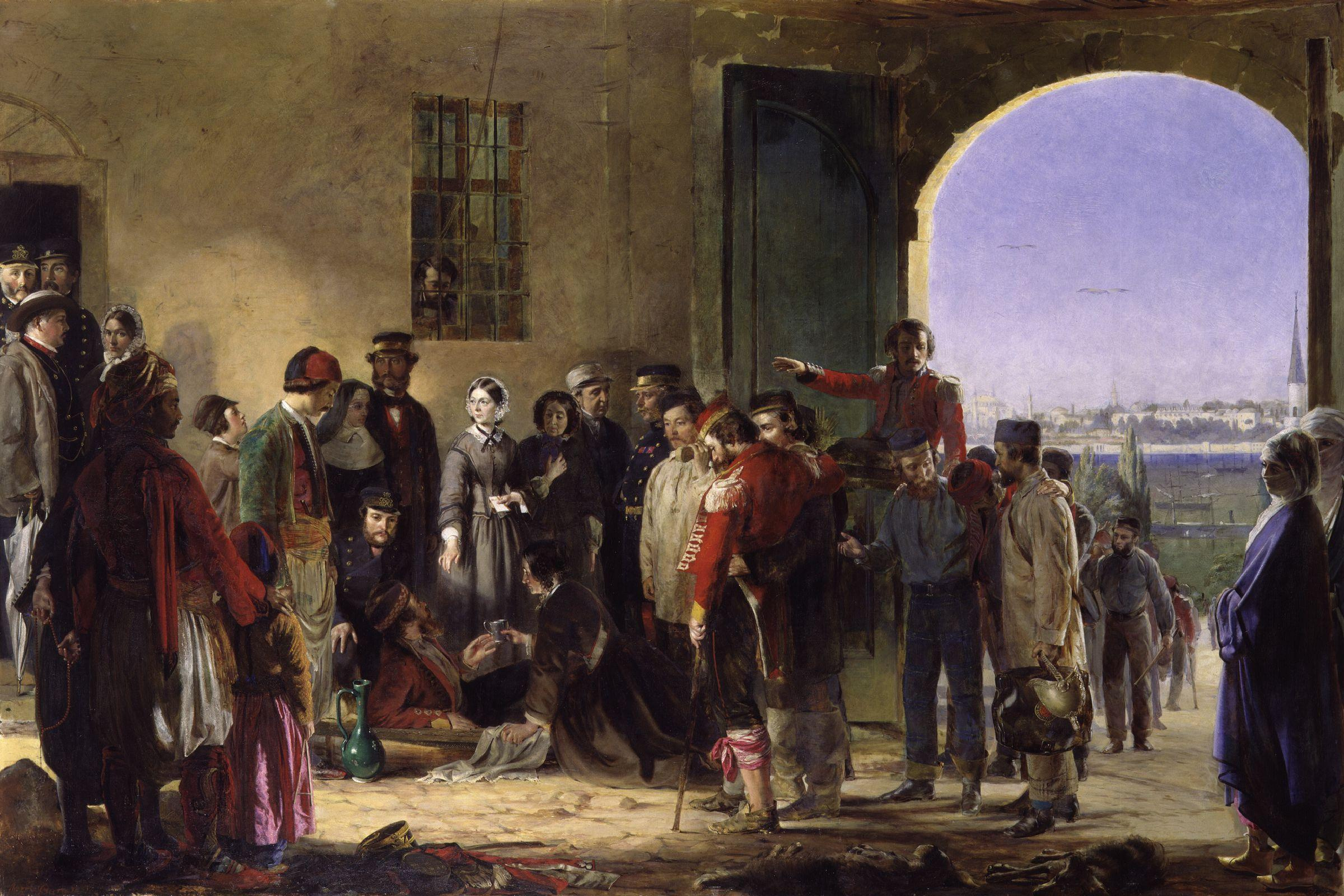
In Barrett's Florence Nightingale Receiving the Wounded at Scutari the artist inserted a self-portrait as a voyeur observing the scene from the window in the background.

There is documentation to suggest that Barrett traveled to the Crimea to obtain sketches for his pictures. Queen Victoria's First Visit to Her Wounded Soldiers was exhibited at the Royal Exhibition Gallery in Piccadilly in May, 1856, and engraved by Agnews. It was Thomas Agnew who purchased The Mission of Mercy from the artist in August 1857, and exhibited it at Leggatt and Hayward Gallery in Cornhill in the summer of 1858 at the height of the Indian Mutiny.

== Works ==
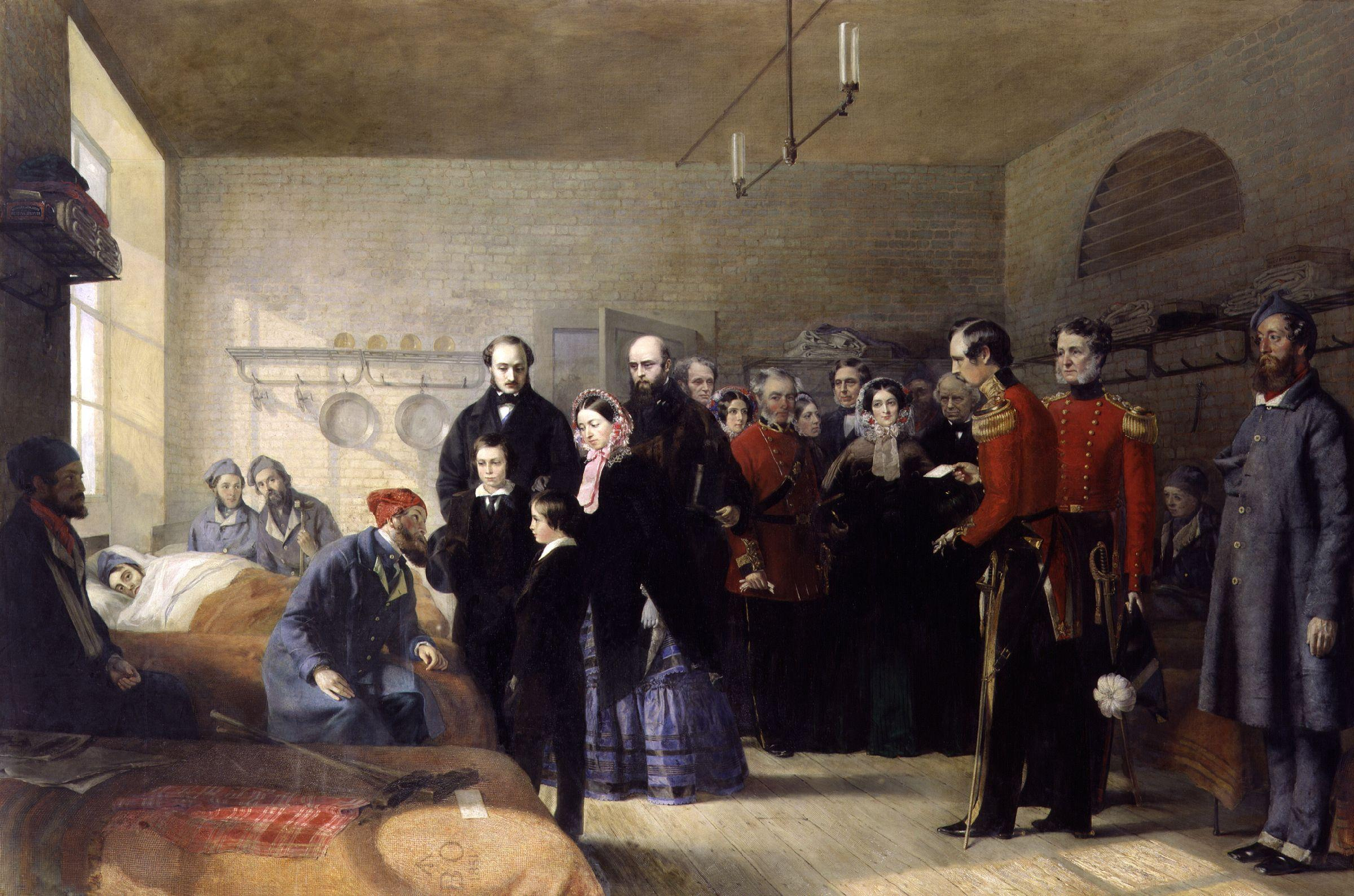
Queen Victoria's First Visit to her Wounded Soldiers by Jerry Barrett

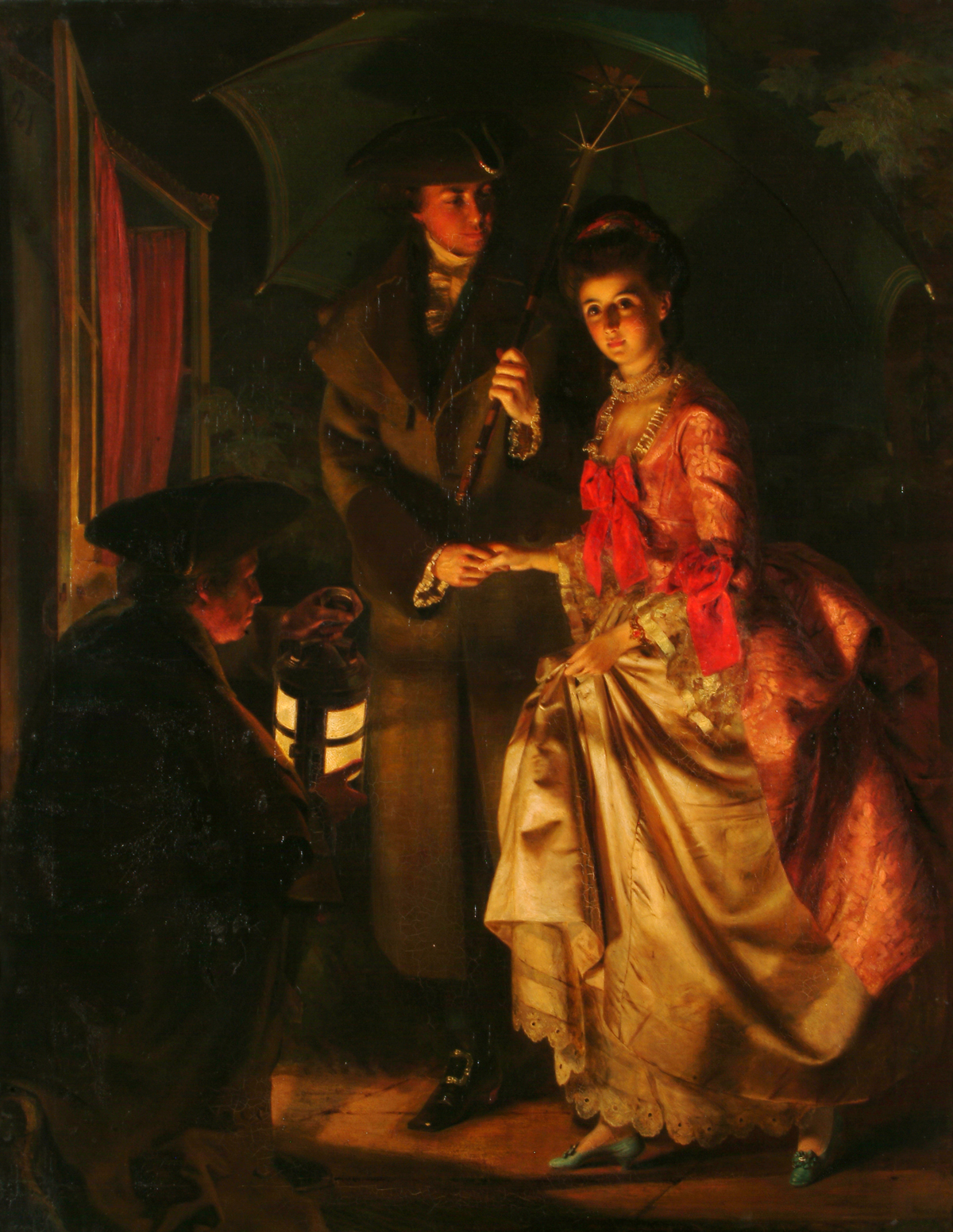
Sheridan assisting Miss Linley, Jerry Barrett (1824–1906)

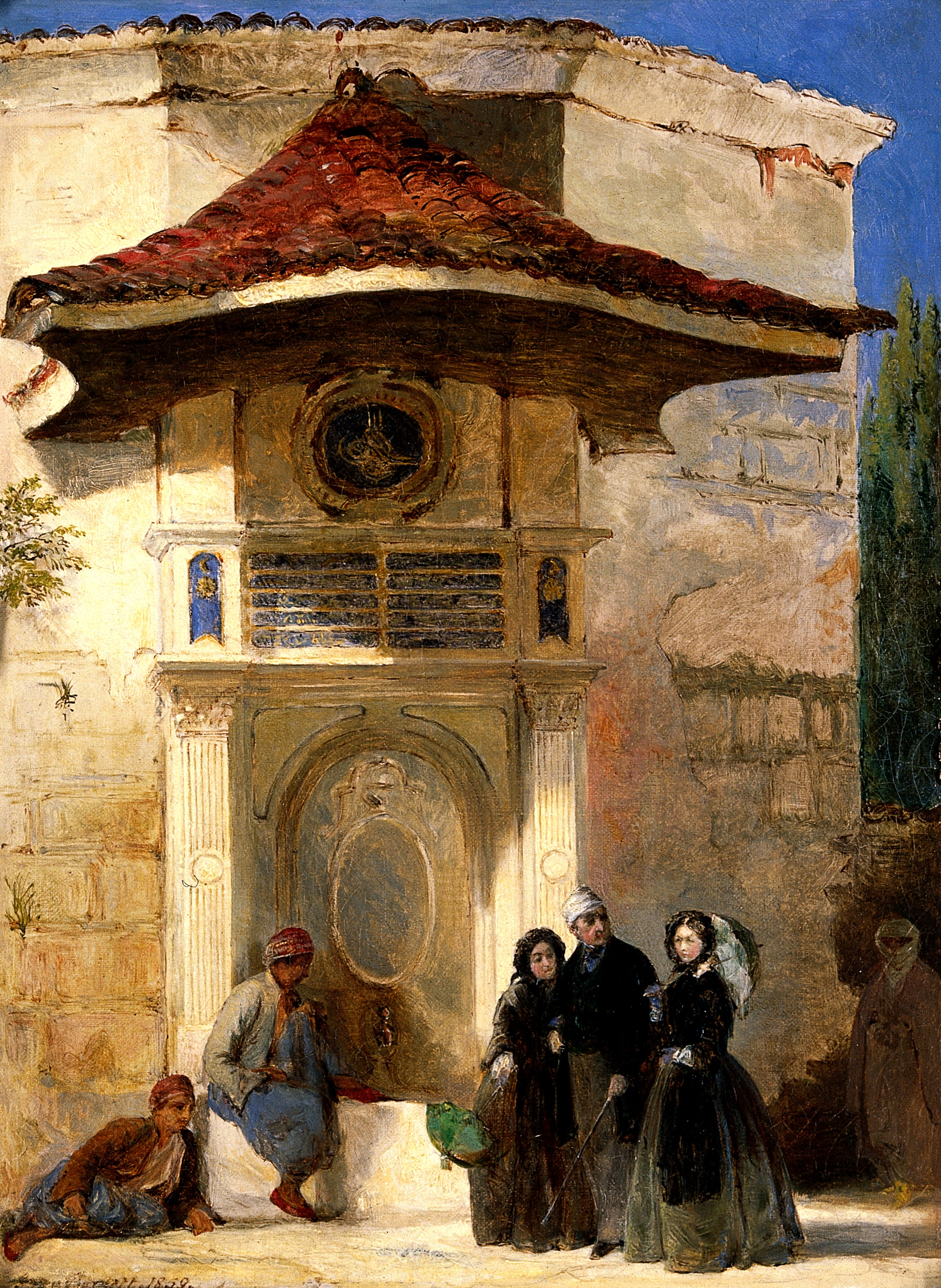
Florence Nightingale with Charles Holte Bracebridge and Selina Bracebridge

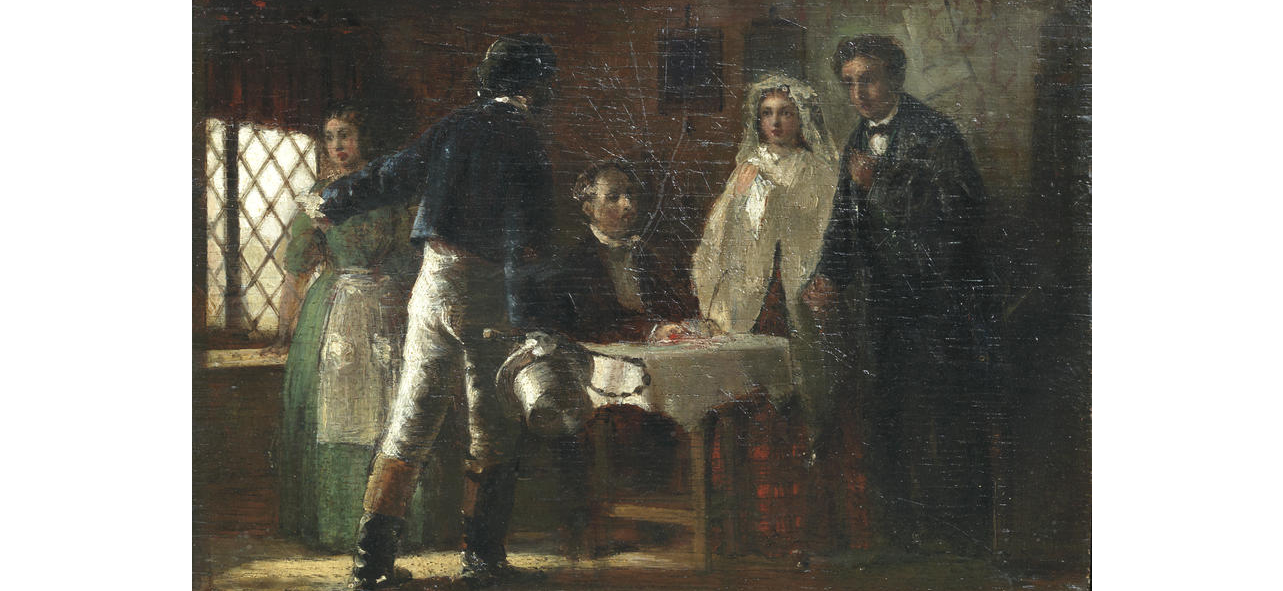
Painting by Jerry Barrett

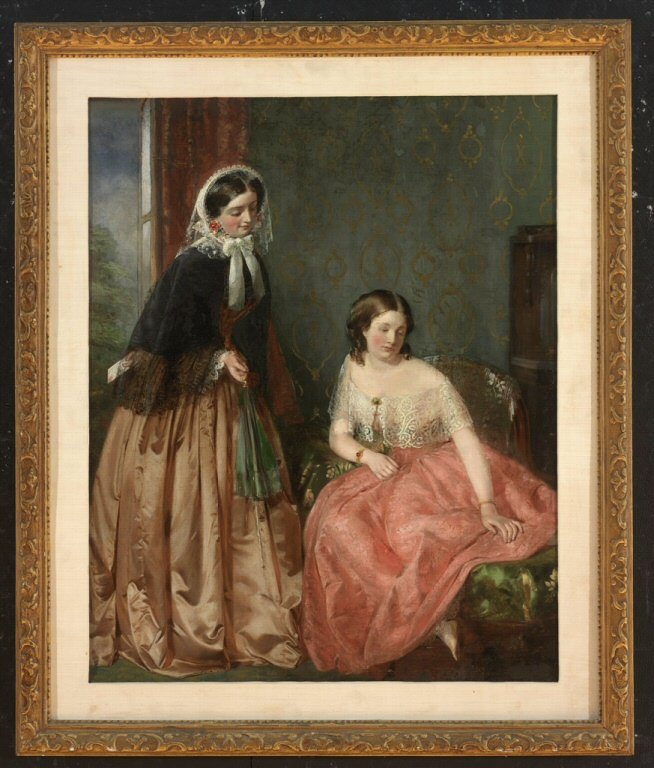
Jerry Barrett - The Letter - 54.147.79 - Rhode Island School of Design Museum

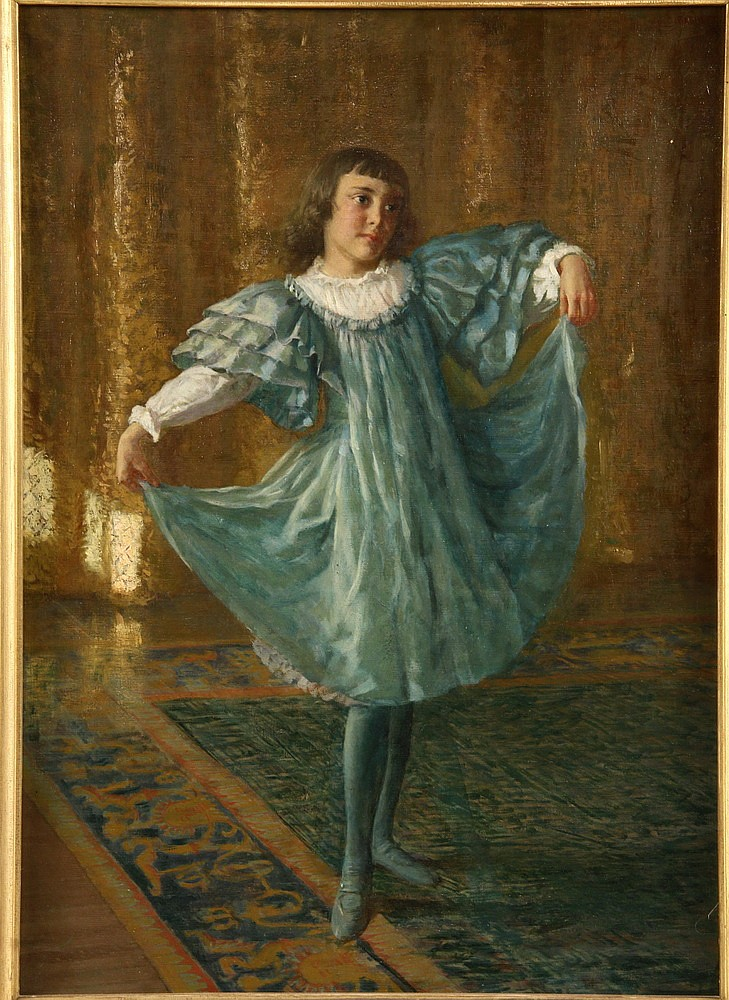
Painting by Jerry Barrett

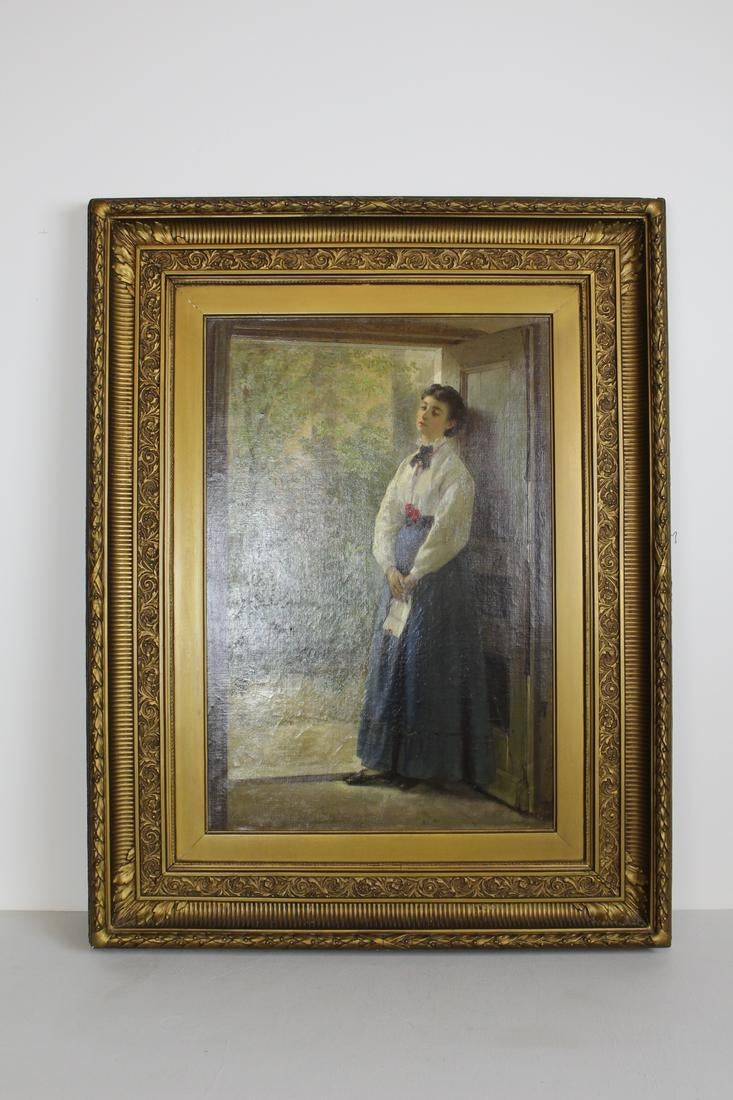
Letter by Jerry Barrett
