= 1850 in art =

Events from the year 1850 in art.

== Events ==
- 6 May – The Royal Academy Exhibition of 1850 opens at the National Gallery in London
- Controversial exhibition of Pre-Raphaelite paintings by Holman Hunt and Millais at the Royal Academy, Millais' Christ in the House of His Parents being attacked for its ultra-realism. James Collinson resigns from the Pre-Raphaelite Brotherhood.
- Francisco Goya's engravings, Proverbios, are posthumously published.
- Edouard Pingret relocates to Mexico City.

== Awards ==
- Grand Prix de Rome, painting: William-Adolphe Bouguereau, Paul Baudry.
- Grand Prix de Rome, sculpture:
- Grand Prix de Rome, architecture:
- Grand Prix de Rome, music: J.A. Charlot.

== Works ==
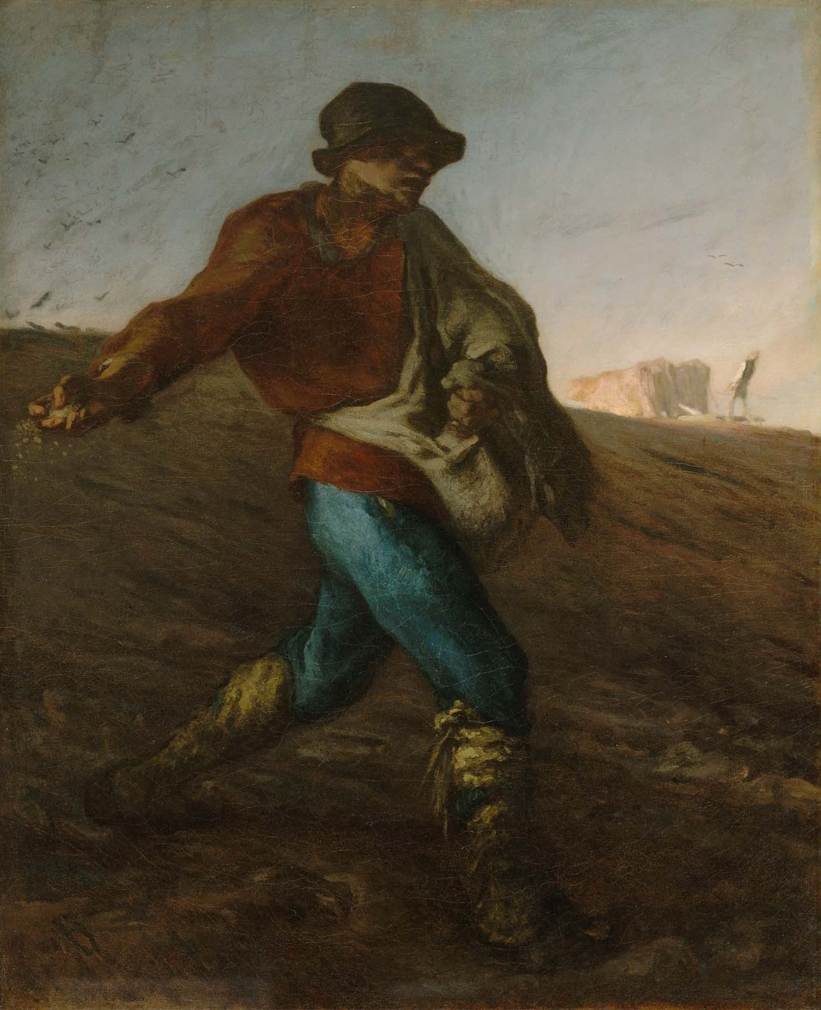
J.-F. Millet – The Sower

- Ivan Aivazovsky – The Ninth Wave
- Oswald Achenbach – Evening in the Campagna
- Hendrik van de Sande Bakhuyzen – The Artist Painting a Cow in a Meadow Landscape
- Paul Baudry – Zenobia Found by the Shepherds
- Théodore Chassériau
  - Othello and Desdemona in Venice
  - Portrait of Alexis de Tocqueville
- Marshall Claxton – Lady Godiva
- Charles Allston Collins – Berengaria's Alarm
- James Collinson
  - Answering the Emigrant's Letter
  - The Renunciation of St. Elizabeth of Hungary
- Jean-Baptiste-Camille Corot – The Dance of the Nymphs
- Gustave Courbet
  - A Burial At Ornans
  - The Stone Breakers
- Hippolyte Delaroche – Bonaparte Crossing the Alps
- Charles Lock Eastlake – The Good Samaritan
- William Maw Egley – Prospero and Miranda (approximate date)
- Emmanuel Frémiet
  - Wounded Bear
  - Wounded Dog
- William Powell Frith – Mr Honeywood Introduces the Bailiffs to Miss Richland as His Friends
- J. W. Glass -
  - John Rolfe and Pocahontas
- Francis Grant – Portrait of John Gibson Lockhart
- Horatio Greenough – The Rescue (statue)
- Francesco Hayez
  - Meditation (first version)
  - Susanna at her Bath
- John Rogers Herbert
  - Children of the Painter
  - Cordelia Disinherited (oil on canvas, Harris Museum, Preston, Lancashire)
  - Lear Disinheriting Cordelia (fresco in Poets' Hall, Palace of Westminster)
- James Holland – Greenwich Hospital from the West Side
- William Holman Hunt – A Converted British Family Sheltering a Christian Missionary from the Persecution of the Druids
- James Clarke Hook
  - The Defeat of Shylock
  - A Dream of Venice
- Daniel Huntington – Feckenham in the Tower
- Edwin Landseer – A Dialogue at Waterloo
- Jan August Hendrik Leys – Divine Service in Holland
- Daniel Maclise – Macready as Werner
- Adolph von Menzel – Round Table at Sansouci
- Ernest Meissonier – An Artist Showing His Work
- John Everett Millais
  - Christ in the House of His Parents
  - Ferdinand Lured by Ariel
  - Portrait of Wilkie Collins
- Jean-François Millet – The Sower (Museum of Fine Arts, Boston)
- Henry Wyndham Phillips – The Royal Commissioners for the Exhibition of 1851
- Henri Félix Emmanuel Philippoteaux – The Last Banquet of the Girondins
- Frederick Richard Pickersgill – Samson Betrayed
- David Roberts – Interior of Saint-Gommaire, Lierre
- Dante Gabriel Rossetti – Ecce Ancilla Domini!
- Théodore Rousseau - The Forest of Fontainebleau: Morning (c.)
- Ludwig von Schwanthaler (posthumous) – Bavaria statue
- Carl Spitzweg – The Bookworm
- Clarkson Stanfield – Macbeth and the Witches
- J.M.W. Turner
  - The Departure of the Fleet
  - Mercury Sent to Admonish Aeneas
- Edward Matthew Ward – King James Receiving News of the Landing of William of Orange
- George Frederic Watts – Found Drowned (approximate date)

== Births ==
- January 1 – Per Hasselberg, Swedish sculptor (died 1894)
- January 5 – Theodoor Verstraete, Belgian rural realist painter and printmaker (died 1907)
- January 27 – John Collier, English Pre-Raphaelite painter (died 1934)
- February 27 – Henry E. Huntington, American art collector (died 1927)
- March 9 – Sir Hamo Thornycroft, English sculptor (died 1925)
- April 19 – Edward John Gregory, English painter (died 1909)
- April 20
  - Daniel Chester French, American Aculptor (died 1931)
  - Jean-François Raffaëlli, French realist painter (died 1924)
- April 26 – Harry Bates, English sculptor (died 1899)
- May 8 – Almeida Júnior, Brazilian painter (died 1899)
- July 7 – Max Schmalzl, Bavarian religious painter and illustrator (died 1930)
- September 29 – George Hitchcock, American-born painter en plein air (died 1913)
- November 22 – Georg Dehio, Estonian-born German art historian (died 1932)
- September 23 – Alfred Boucher, French sculptor (died 1934)
- November 28 – Robert Koehler, German-born American painter (died 1917)
- December 25 – Florence Griswold, American curator (died 1937)
- December 31 – John Wycliffe Lowes Forster, Canadian portrait painter (died 1938)

== Death ==
- January 16 – Daniel Caffé, German pastel painter of portraits (born 1750)
- January 20 – Lorenzo Bartolini, Italian sculptor (born 1777)
- January 22 – William Westall, English landscape painter (born 1781)
- January 27 – Johann Gottfried Schadow, sculptor (born 1764)
- February 23 – Sir William Allan, historical painter (born 1782)
- April 11 – Jean Augustin Daiwaille, Dutch portrait painter (born 1786)
- April 15 – Jules Robert Auguste, French Impressionist painter (born 1789)
- April 16 – Madame Marie Tussaud, French-born modeller of waxworks (born 1761)
- May – Richard James Wyatt, sculptor (born 1795)
- July 22 – Vicente López y Portaña, Spanish portrait painter (born 1772)
- August 13 – Sir Martin Archer Shee, Irish-born portrait painter (born 1769)
- August 27 – Henry Room, English portrait painter (born 1802)
- October 2 – Sarah Biffen, disabled English painter (born 1784)
- November 10 – Alexandre-Évariste Fragonard, French painter and sculptor in the troubadour style (born 1780)
- December 8 – Anatole Devosge, French painter (born 1770)
- date unknown
  - Jean Broc, painter (born 1771)
  - Francis Hervé, painter (born 1781)
  - François Mulard, Neoclassical French painter (born 1769)
  - Fei Danxu, Chinese painter in the Qing dynasty (born 1801)
