= Royal Academy Exhibition of 1850 =

1850 art exhibition in London

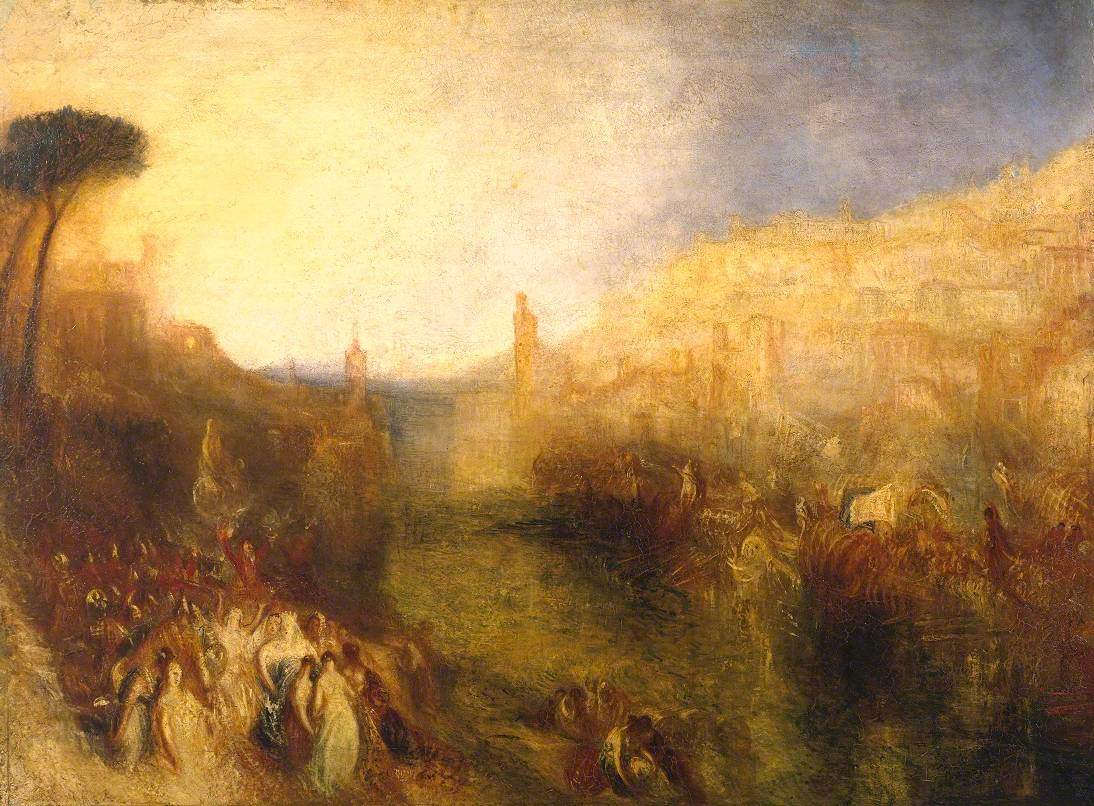
The Departure of the Fleet by J.M.W. Turner

The Royal Academy Exhibition of 1850 was the eighty second annual Summer Exhibition of the British Royal Academy of Arts. It was held at the National Gallery in London's Trafalgar Square from 6 May to 27 July 1850 during the Victorian era.

It was the final time J.M.W. Turner submitted works to the Academy before his death the following year. Turner has been exhibiting works at since his debut as a fifteen year old at the 1790 edition. His four submissions in his final year were inspired by the Aeneid by Virgil and the doomed romance of the Carthaginian queen Dido and the Trojan Aeneas. Turner was by the stage producing proto-impressionist works.

One of the most popular works on display was Edwin Landseer's A Dialogue at Waterloo it depicts an imaginary visit to the Duke of Wellington to the battlefield of Waterloo many years after his victory there. The emerging Pre-Raphaelite movement was represented by Christ in the House of His Parents by John Everett Millais, which attracted a great deal of criticism. William Edward Frost, a former pupil of William Etty, continued the tradition of nude art with The Disarming of Cupid and Andromeda.

Clarkson Stanfield displayed Macbeth and the Witches. The French artist Paul Delaroche displayed his 1831 history painting Cromwell Opening the Coffin of Charles I It was the final exhibition held during the presidency of the Irish portrait painter Martin Archer Shee. He was succeeded as President of the Royal Academy by Charles Lock Eastlake.

== Gallery ==
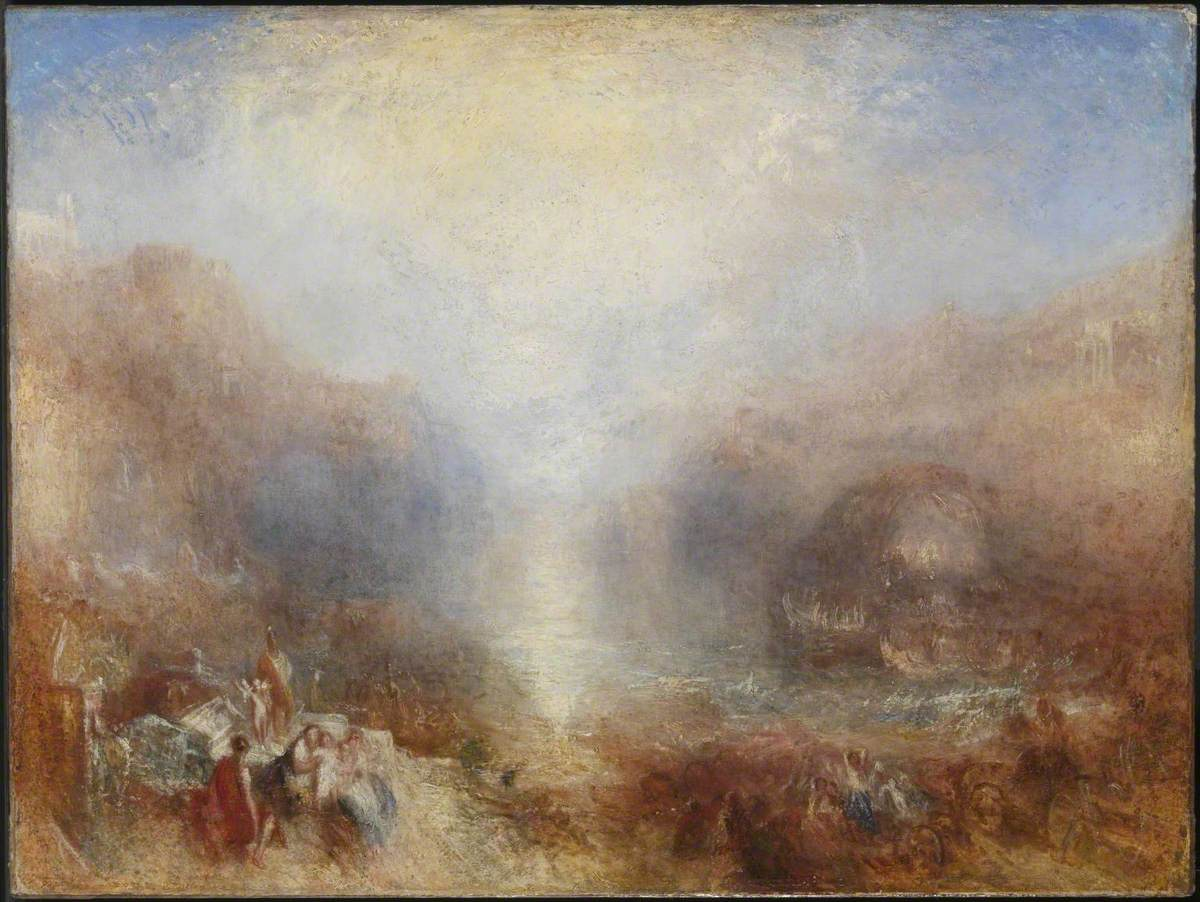
Mercury Sent to Admonish Aeneas by J.M.W. Turner

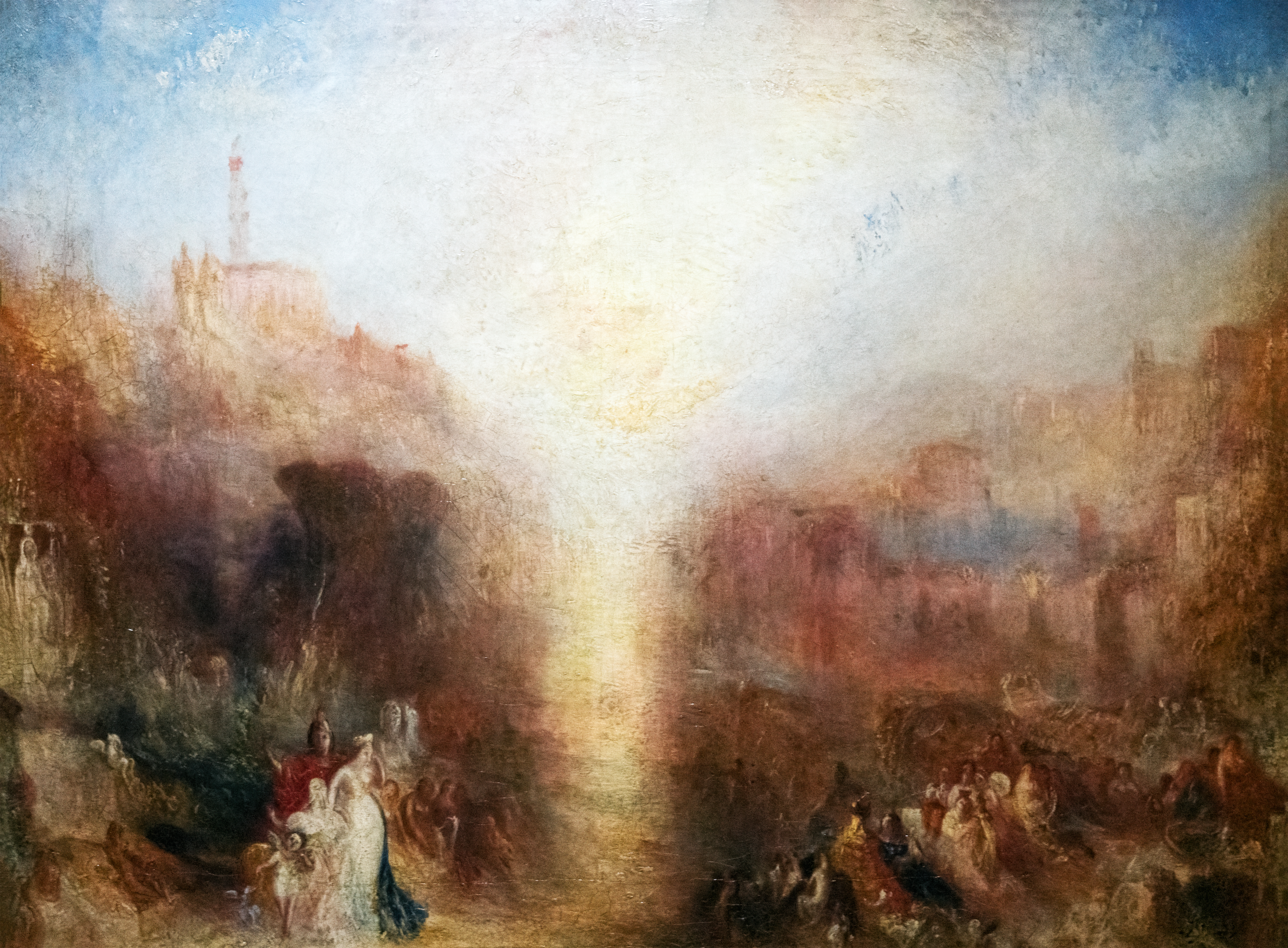
The Visit to the Tomb by J.M.W. Turner

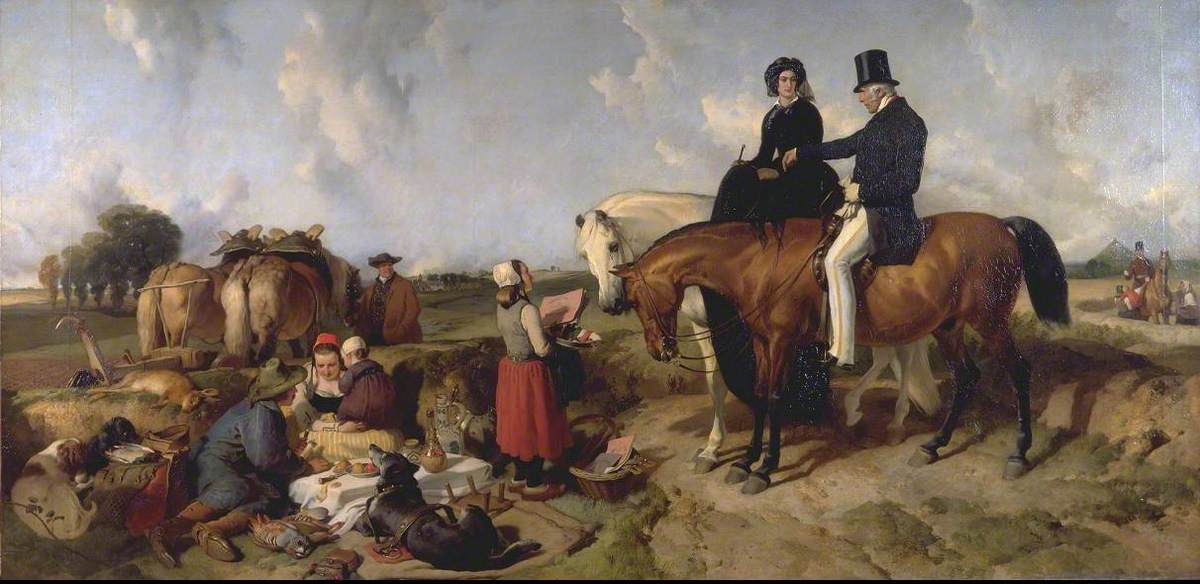
A Dialogue at Waterloo by Edwin Landseer

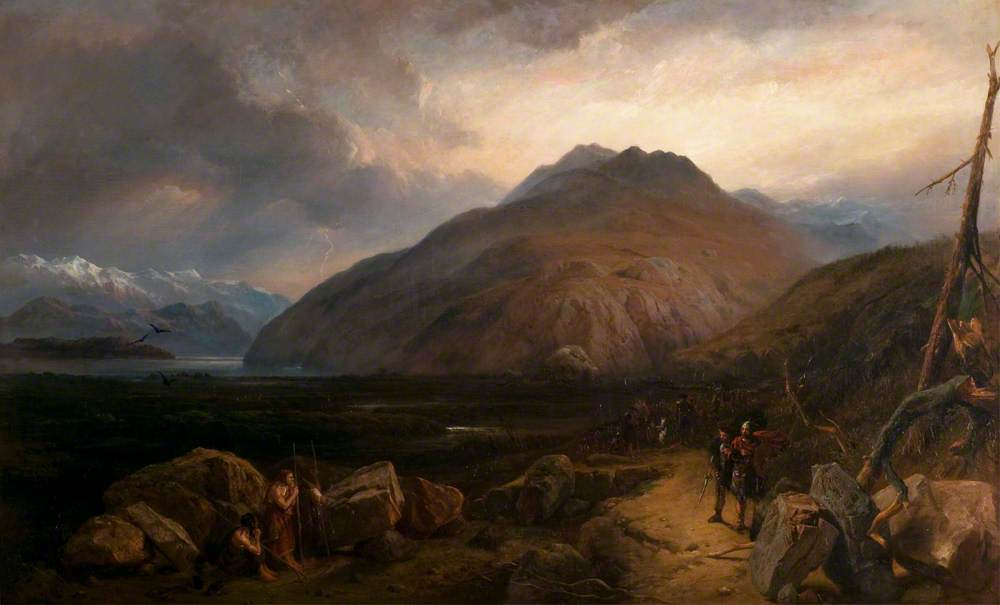
Macbeth and the Witches by Clarkson Stanfield

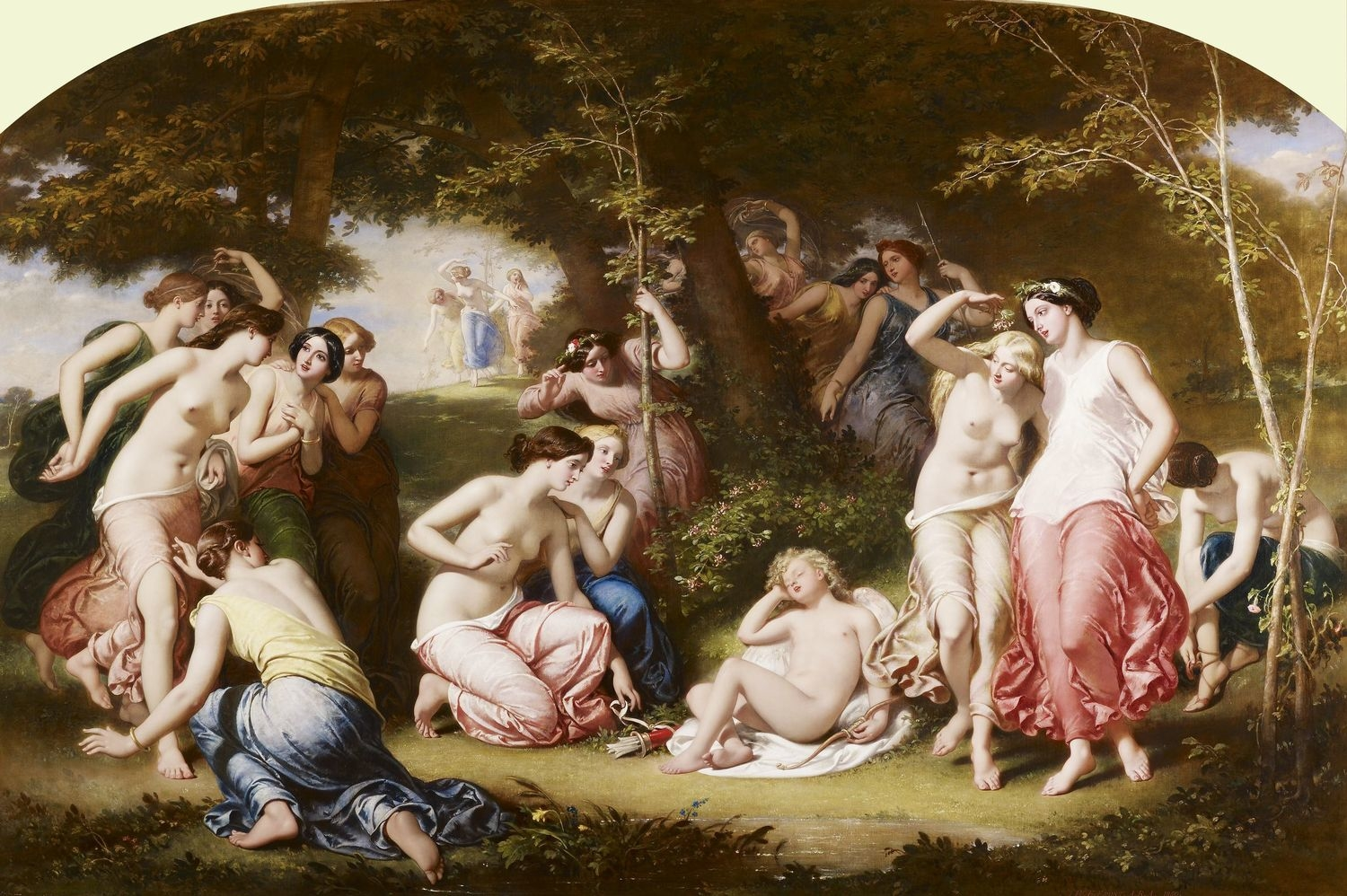
The Disarming of Cupid by William Edward Frost

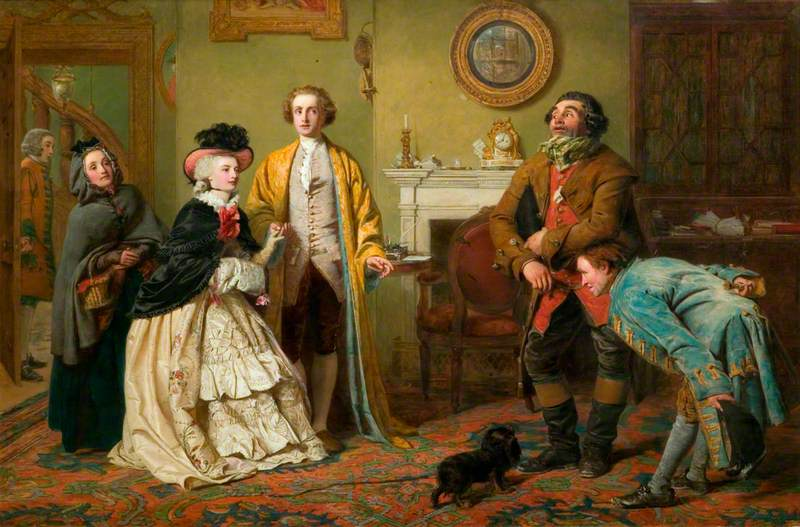
Mr Honeywood Introduces the Bailiffs to Miss Richland as His Friends by William Powell Frith

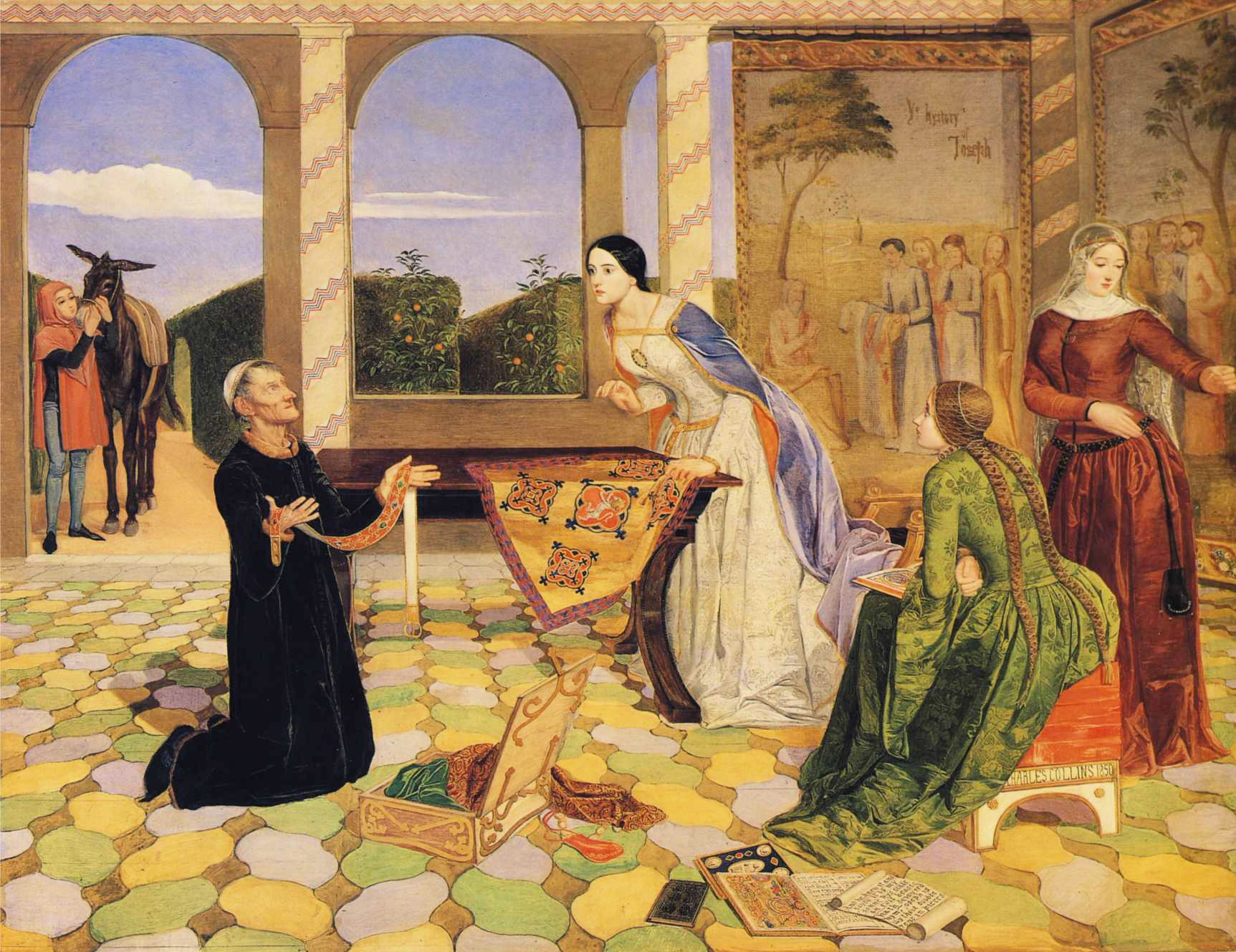
Berengaria's Alarm by Charles Allston Collins

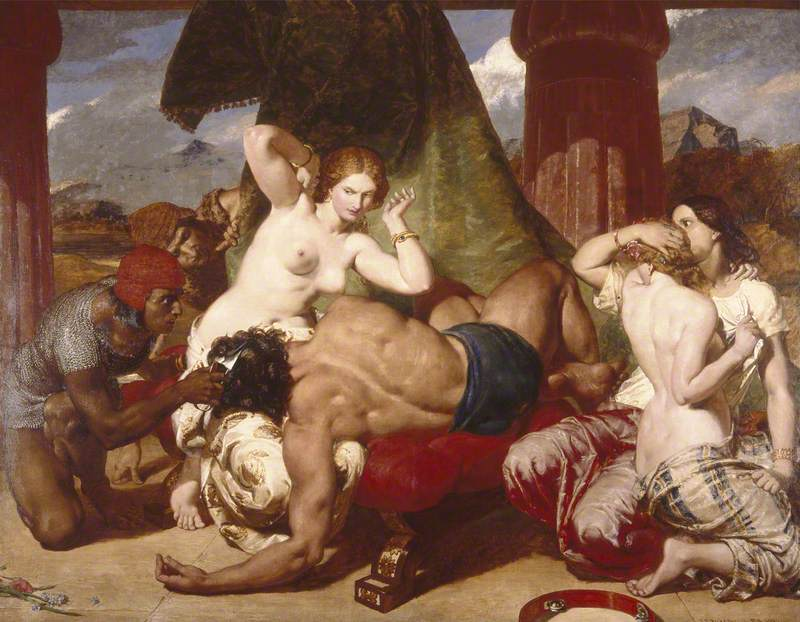
Samson Betrayed by Frederick Richard Pickersgill

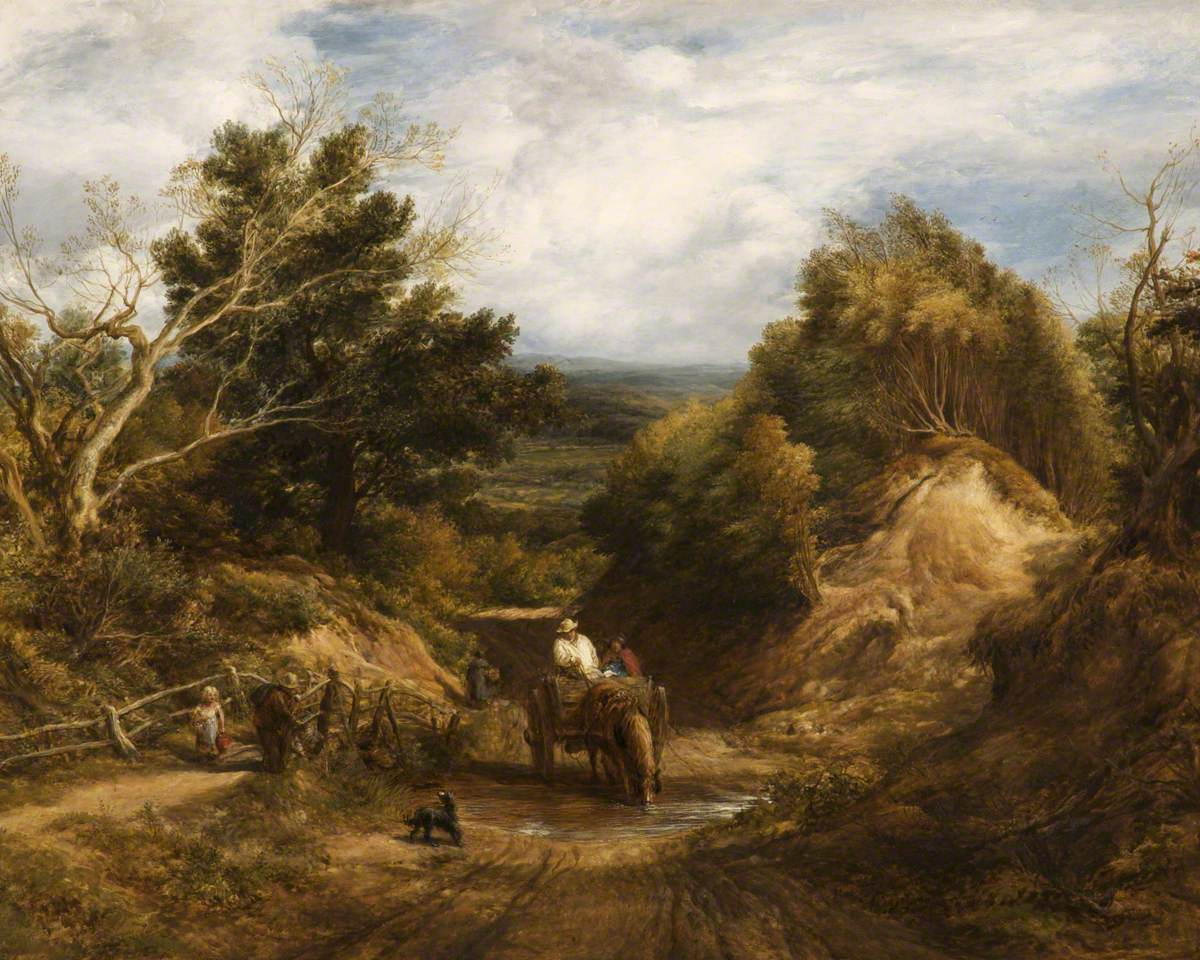
Crossing the Brook by John Linnell

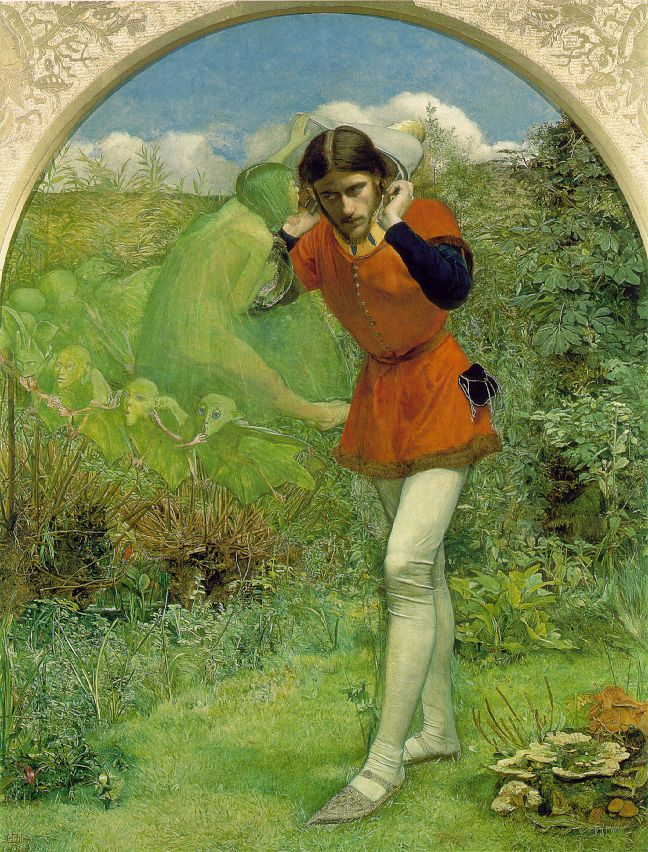
Ferdinand Lured by Ariel by John Everett Millais

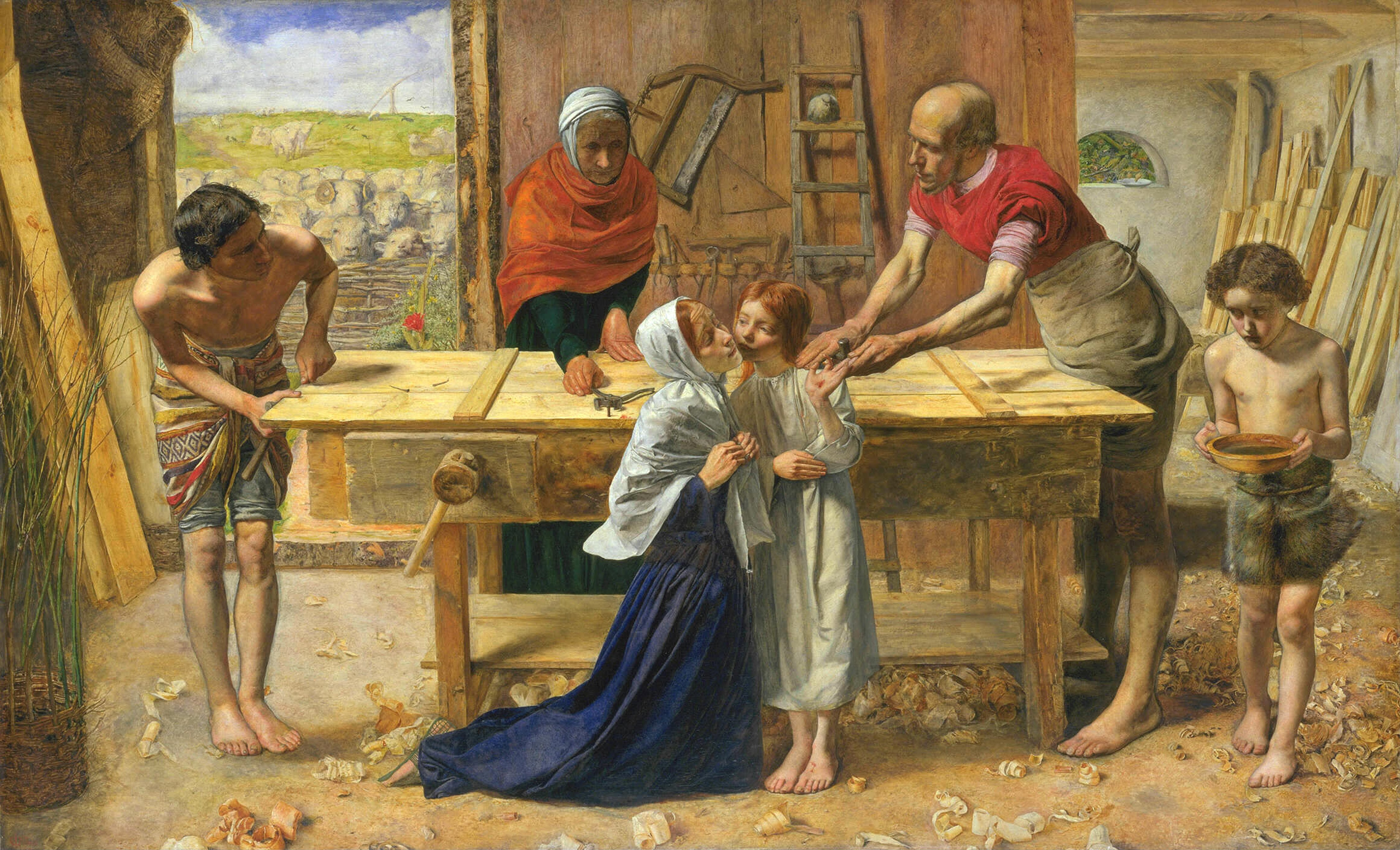
Christ in the House of His Parents by John Everett Millais

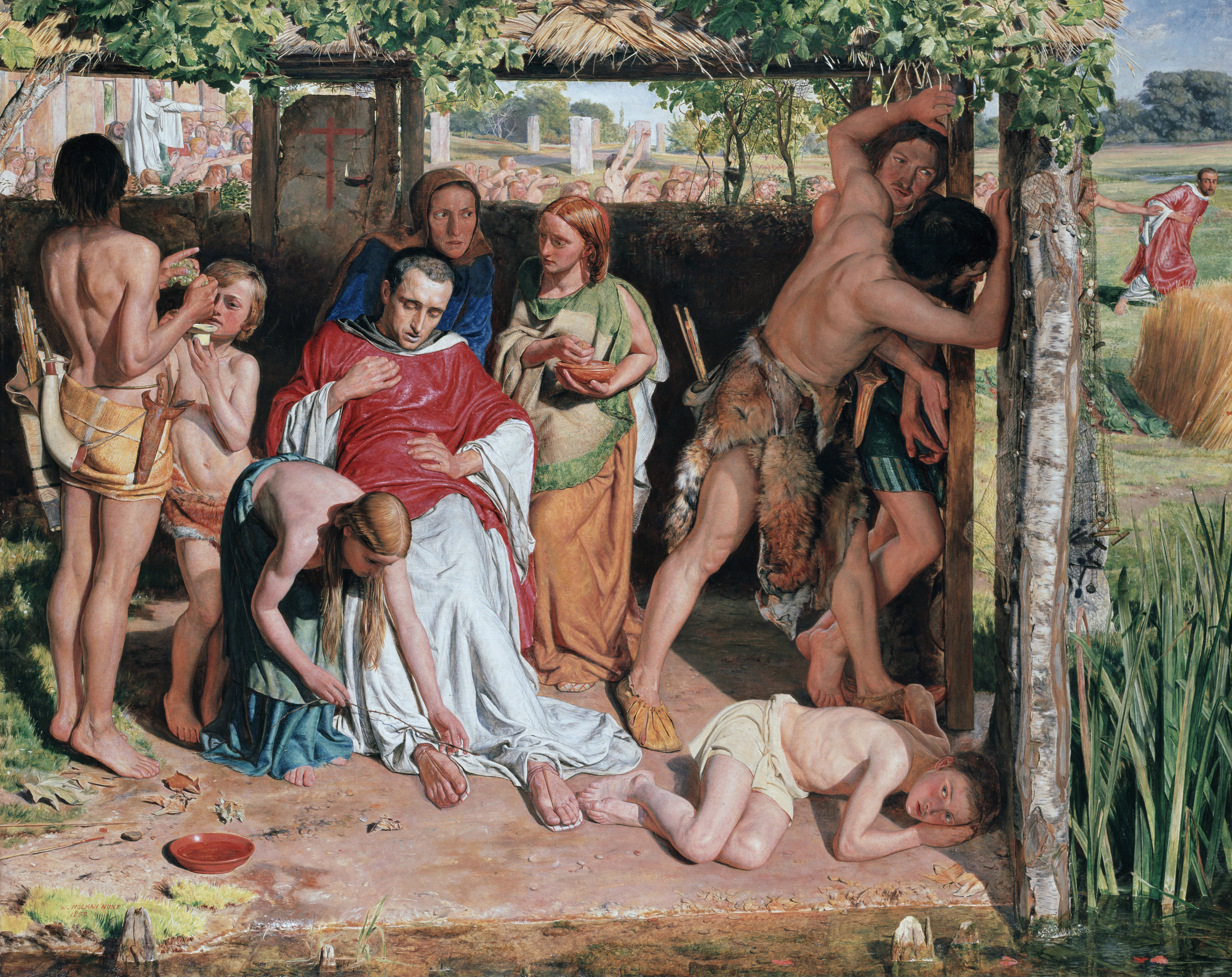
A Converted British Family Sheltering a Christian Missionary from the Persecution of the Druids by William Holman Hunt

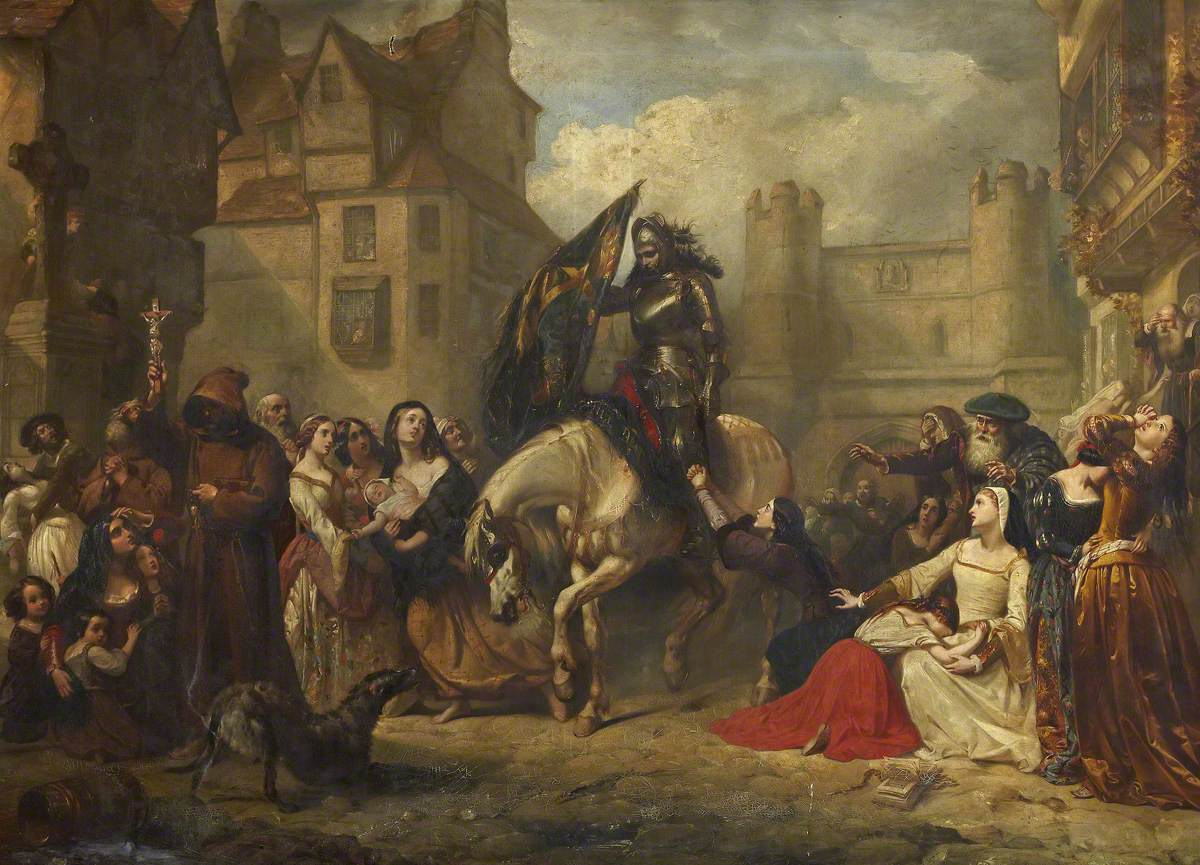
Edinburgh after Flodden by Thomas Jones Barker

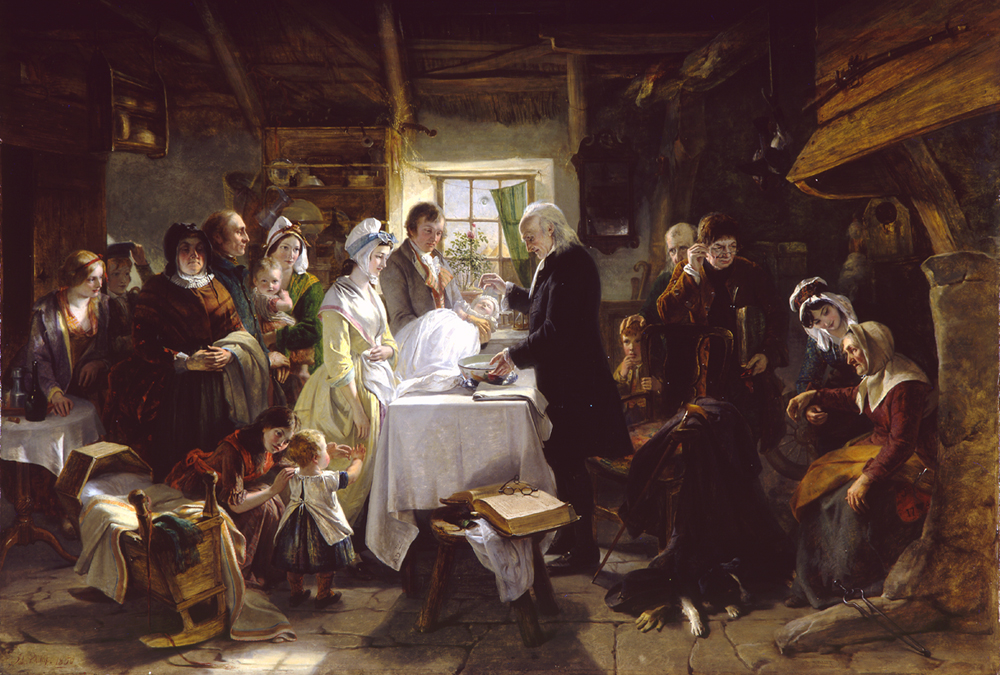
Baptism in Scotland by John Phillip

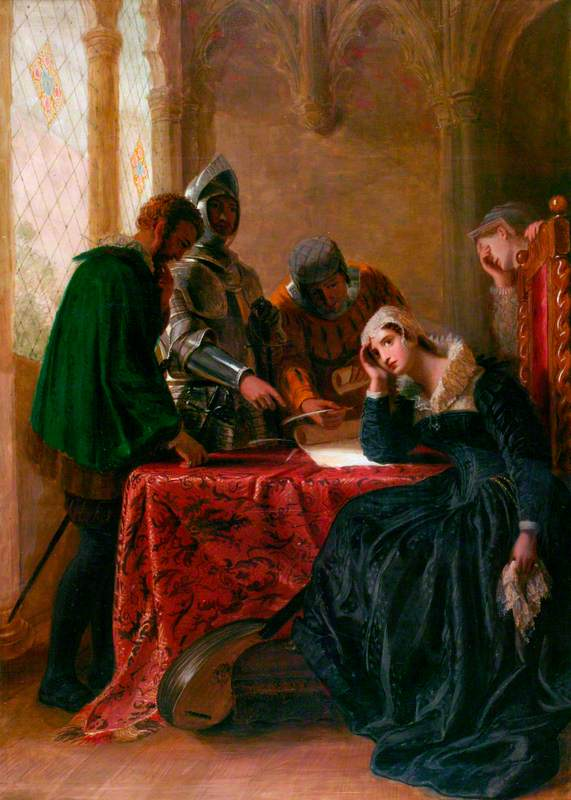
The Abdication of Mary, Queen of Scots by Joseph Severn

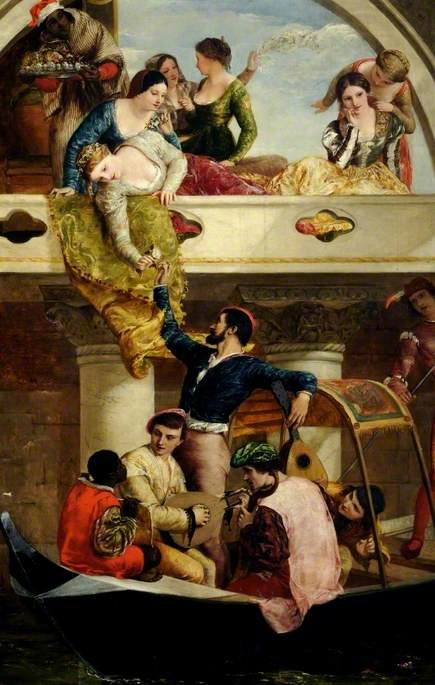
A Dream of Venice by James Clarke Hook

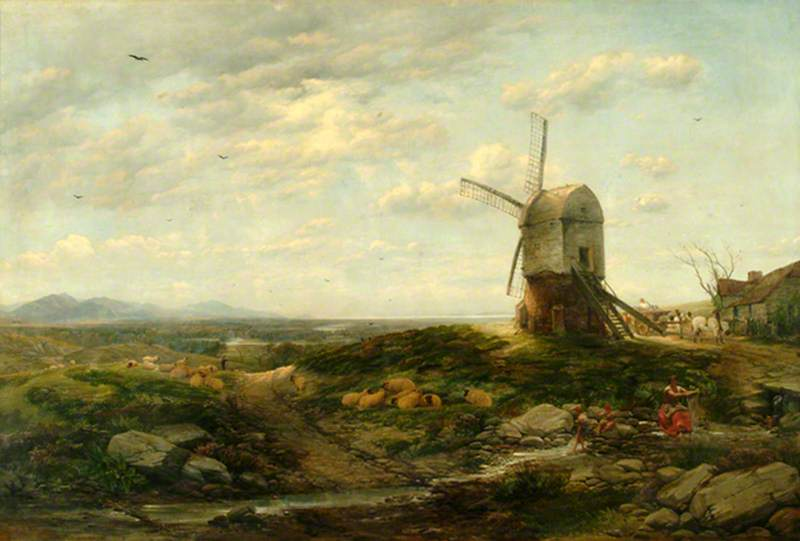
The First Glimpse of the Sea by Thomas Creswick

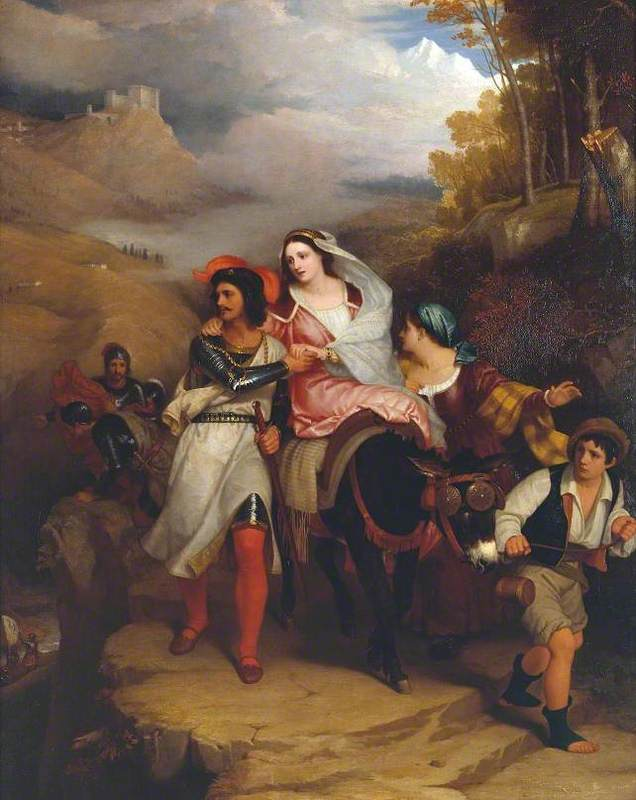
The Escape of Francesco Novello di Carrara by Charles Lock Eastlake

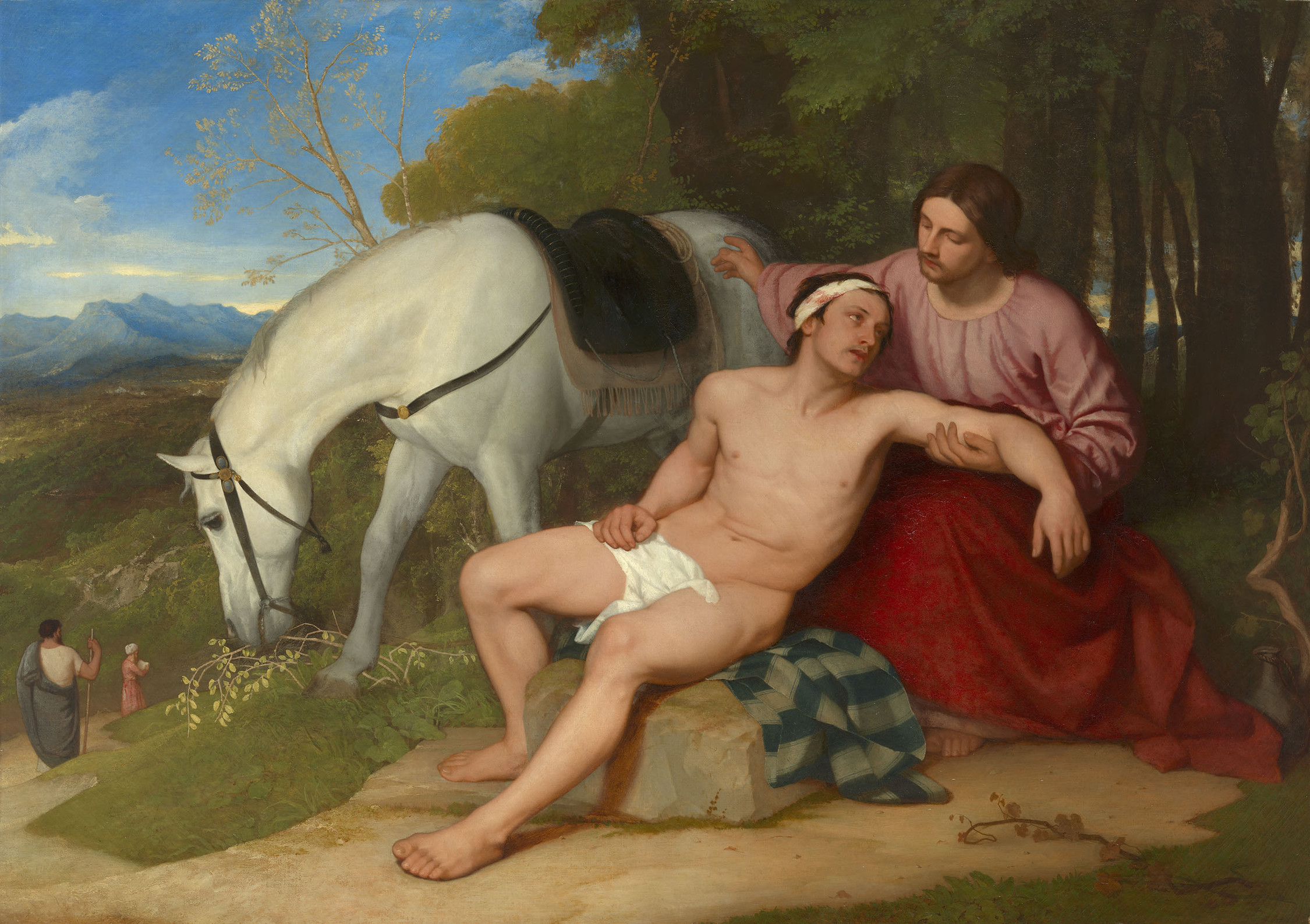
The Good Samaritan by Charles Lock Eastlake

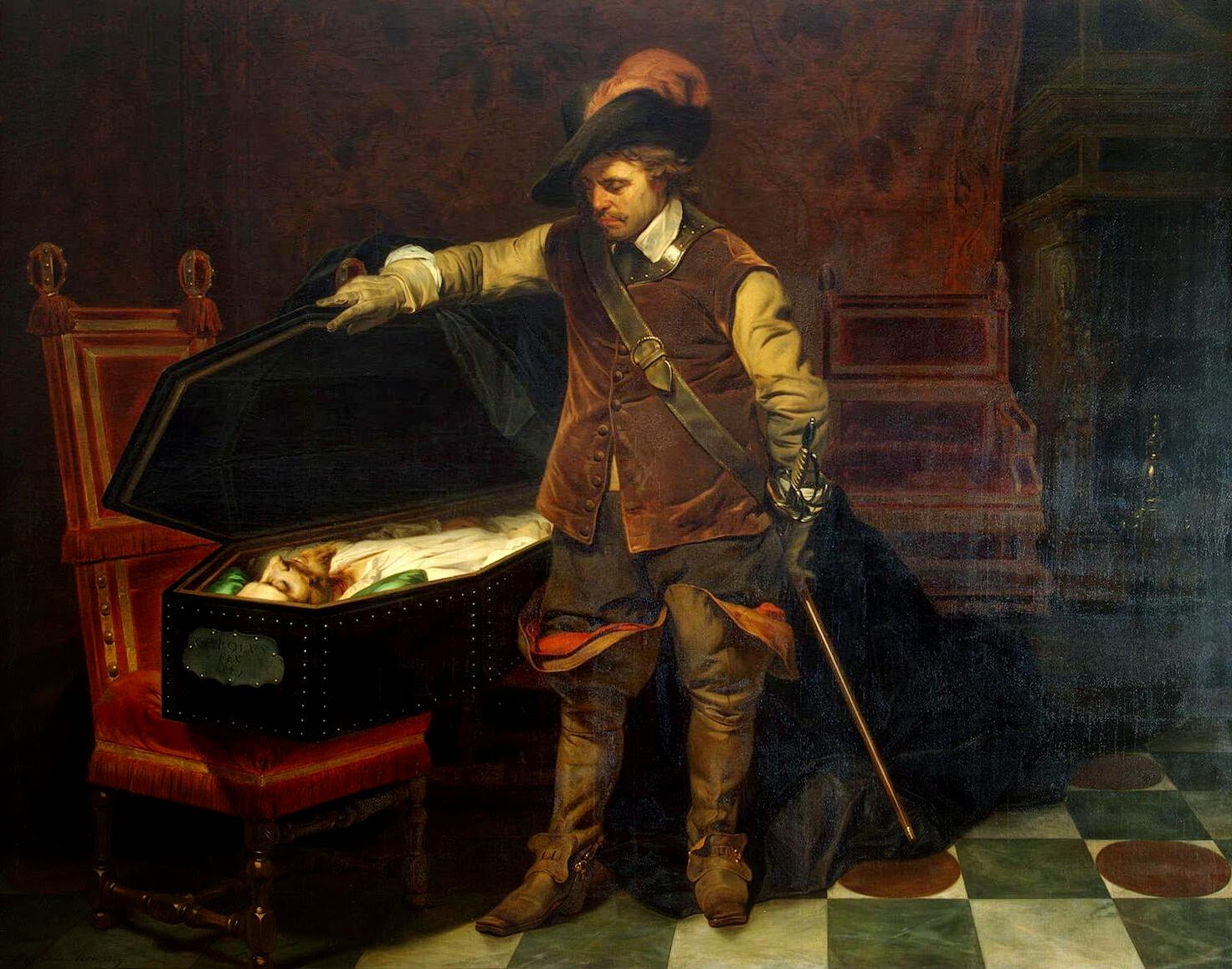
Cromwell Opening the Coffin of Charles I by Paul Delaroche

The Last Man by John Martin

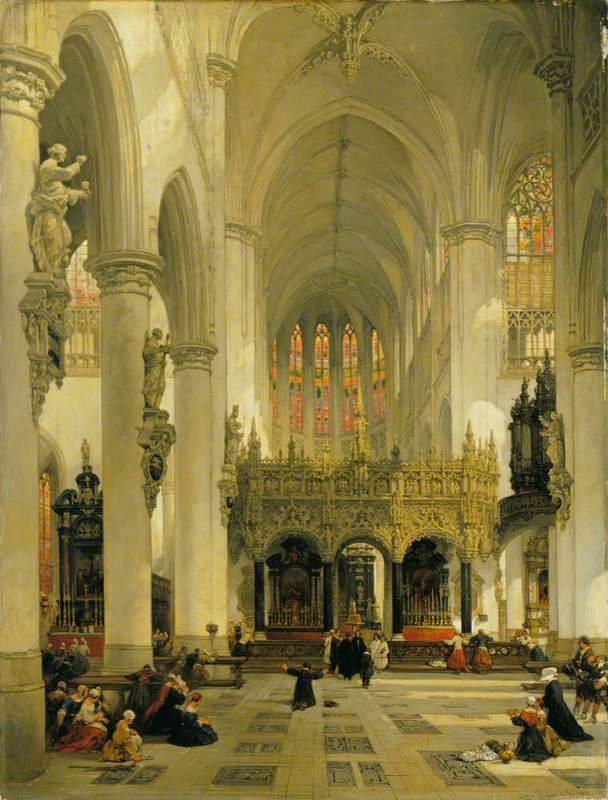
Interior of Saint-Gommaire, Lierre by David Roberts

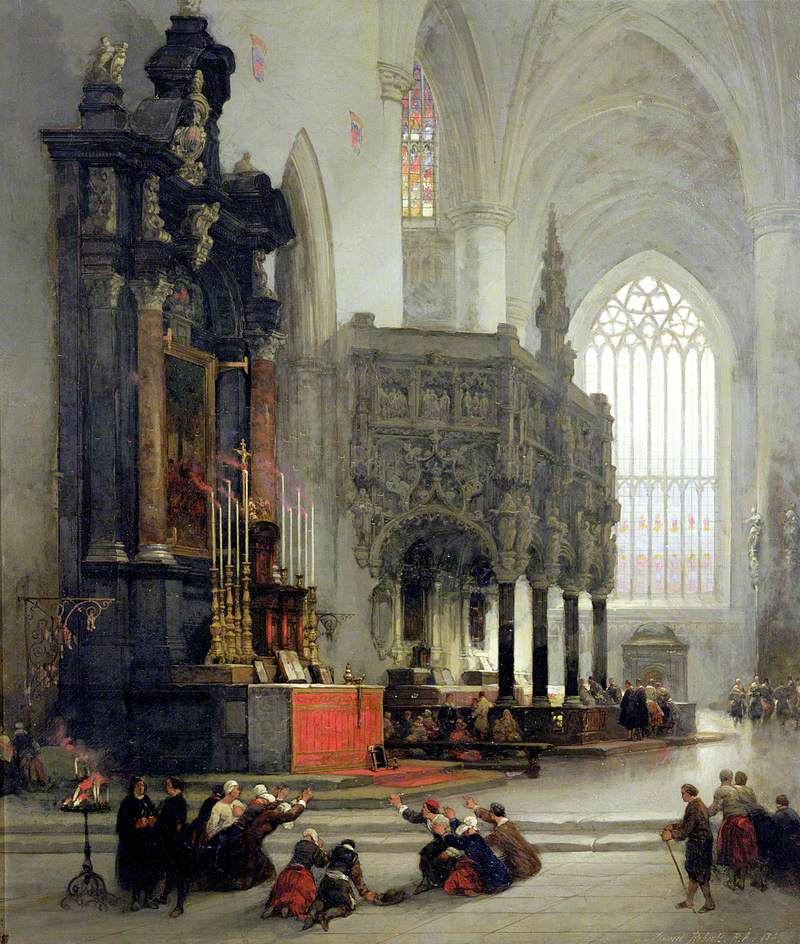
Shrine of Saint Gomar at Lierre by David Roberts

The Ruins of the Smaller Temple at Baalbec by David Roberts

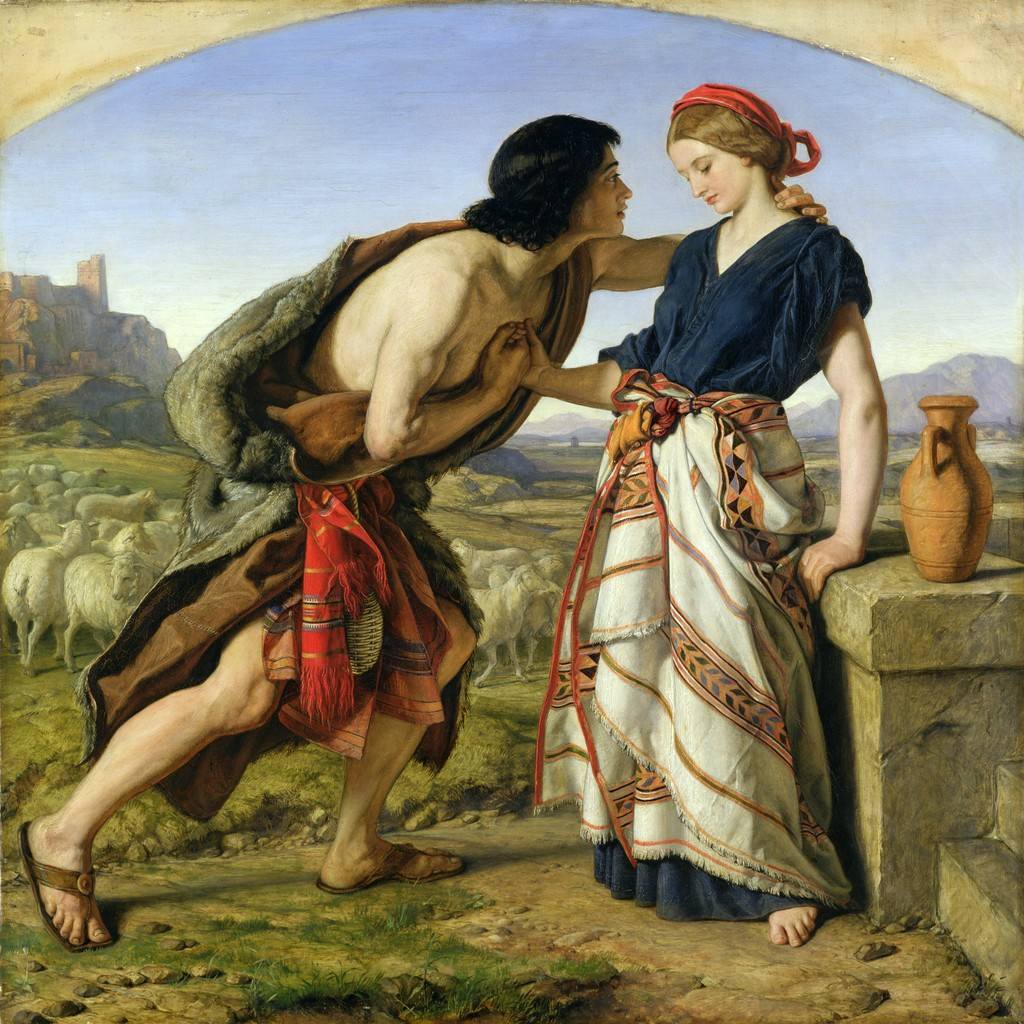
The Meeting of Jacob and Rachel by William Dyce

King James Receiving News of the Landing of William of Orange by Edward Matthew Ward

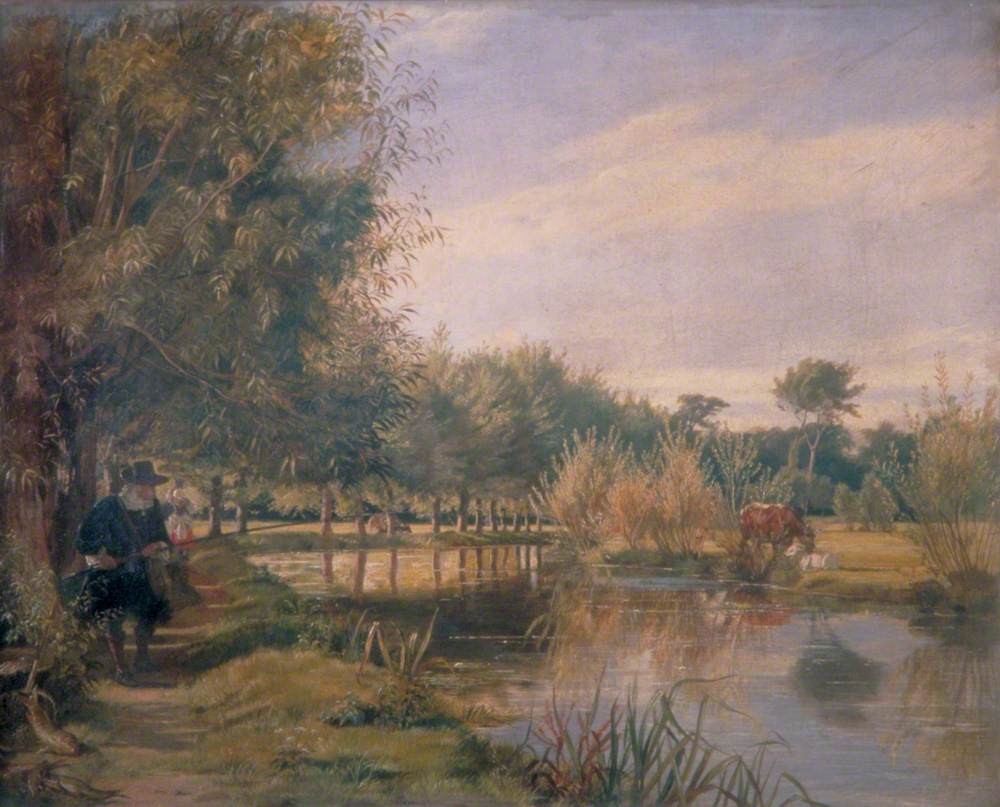
Izaac Walton Angling on a Summer's Day by Edward Matthew Ward

The Awakening of King Lear by the Kiss of Cordelia by Charles West Cope

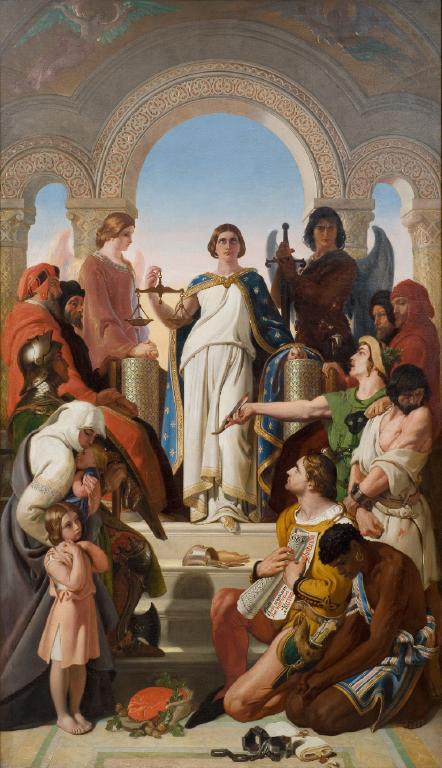
The Spirit of Justice by Daniel Maclise

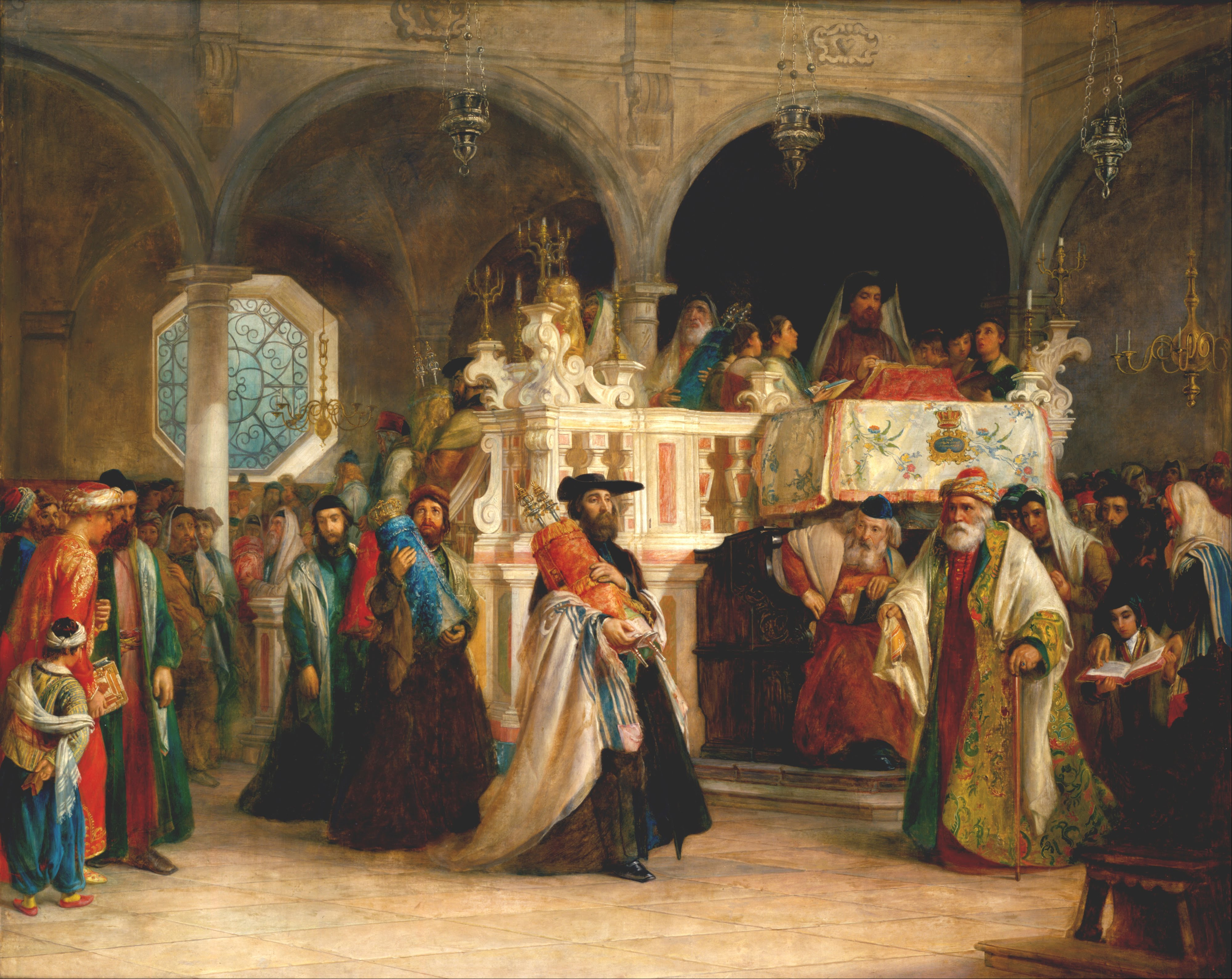
The Feast of the Rejoicing of the Law at the Synagogue in Leghorn, Italy by Solomon Hart

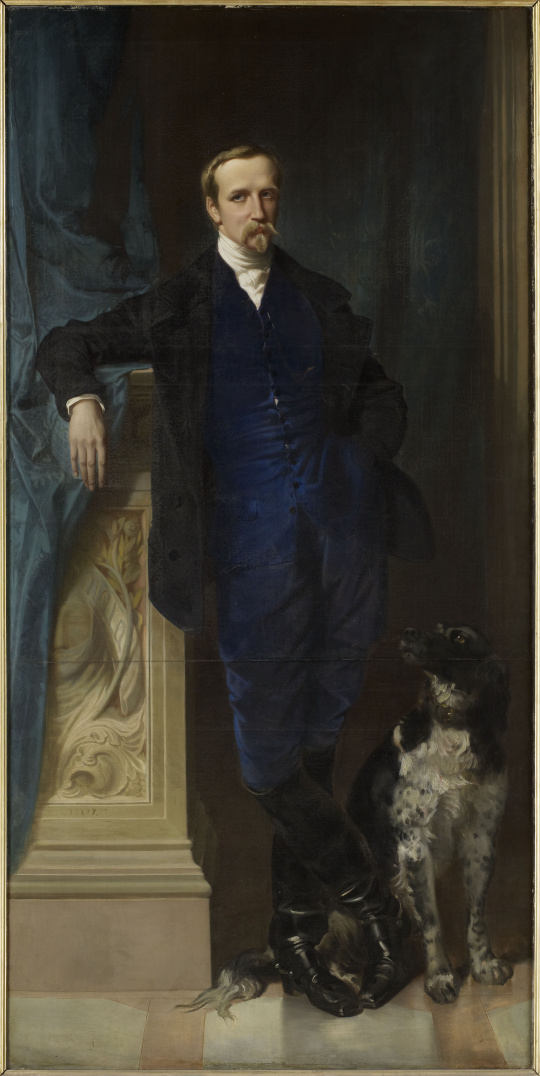
Duke of Aumale by Victor Mottez

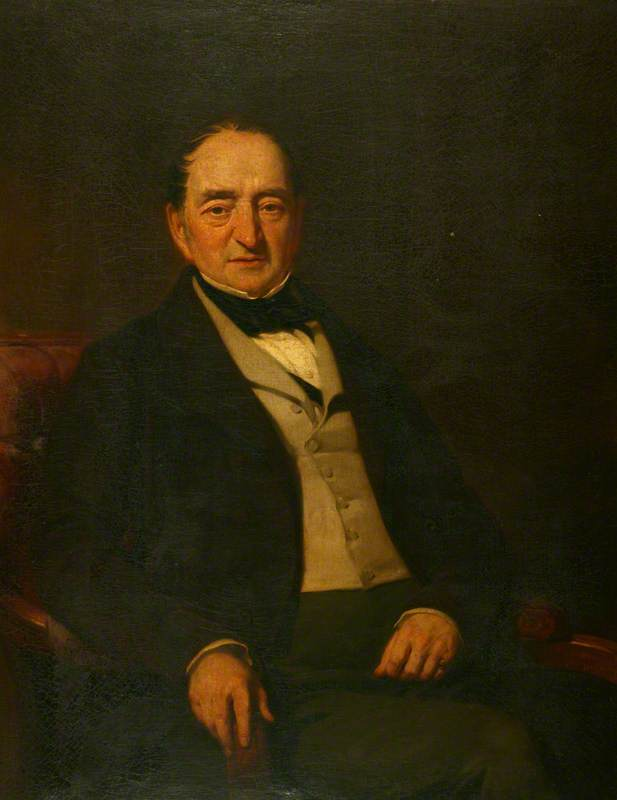
Edmund Buckley by George Patten

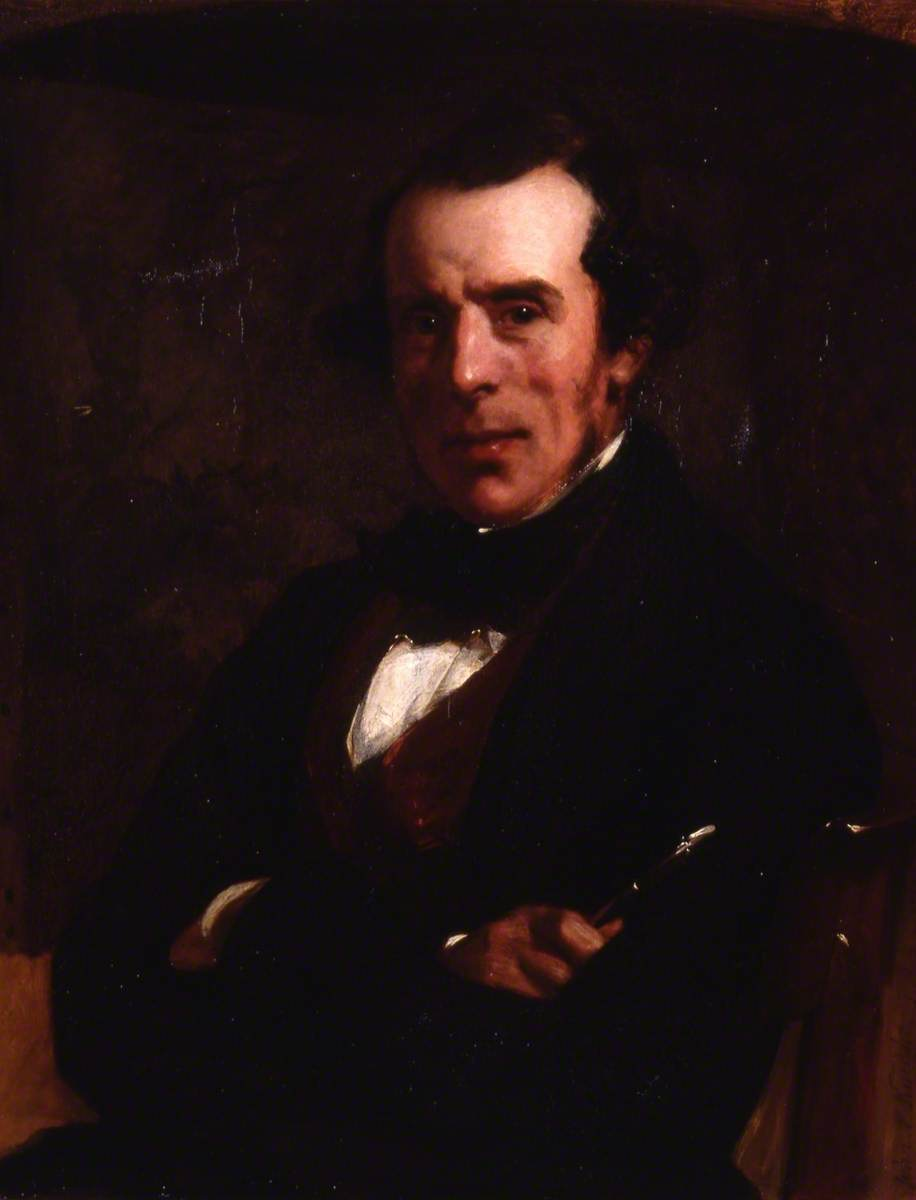
Thomas Sidney Cooper by John Prescott Knight

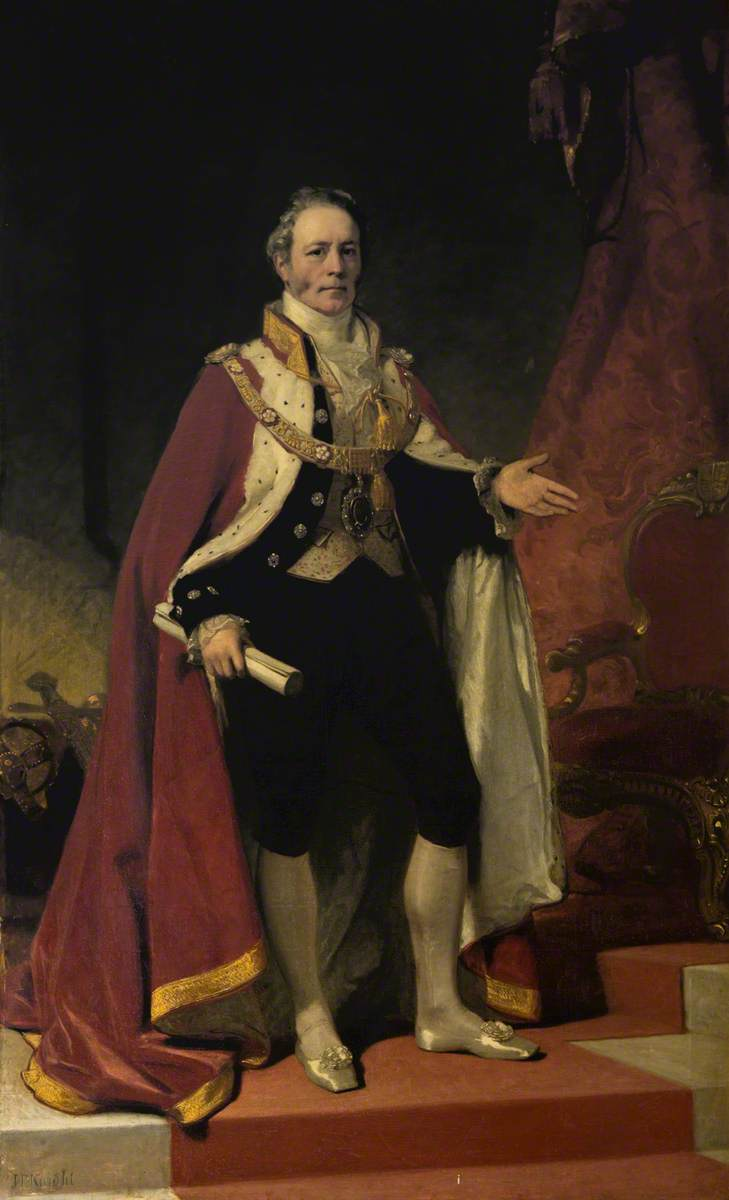
Sir James Duke by John Prescott Knight

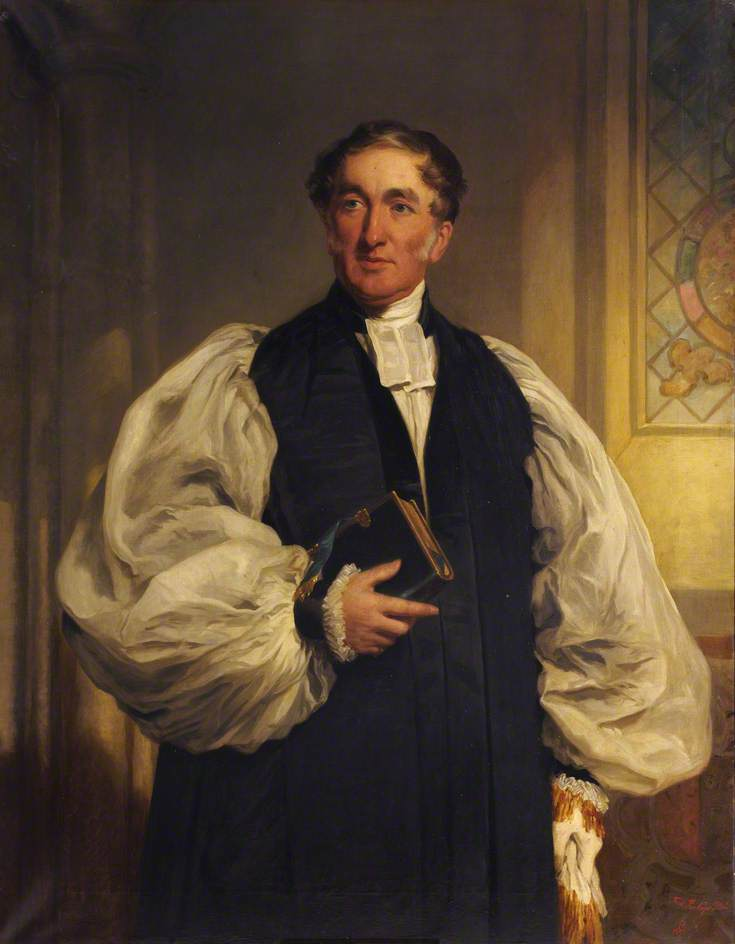
Thomas Musgrave by Frederick Richard Say

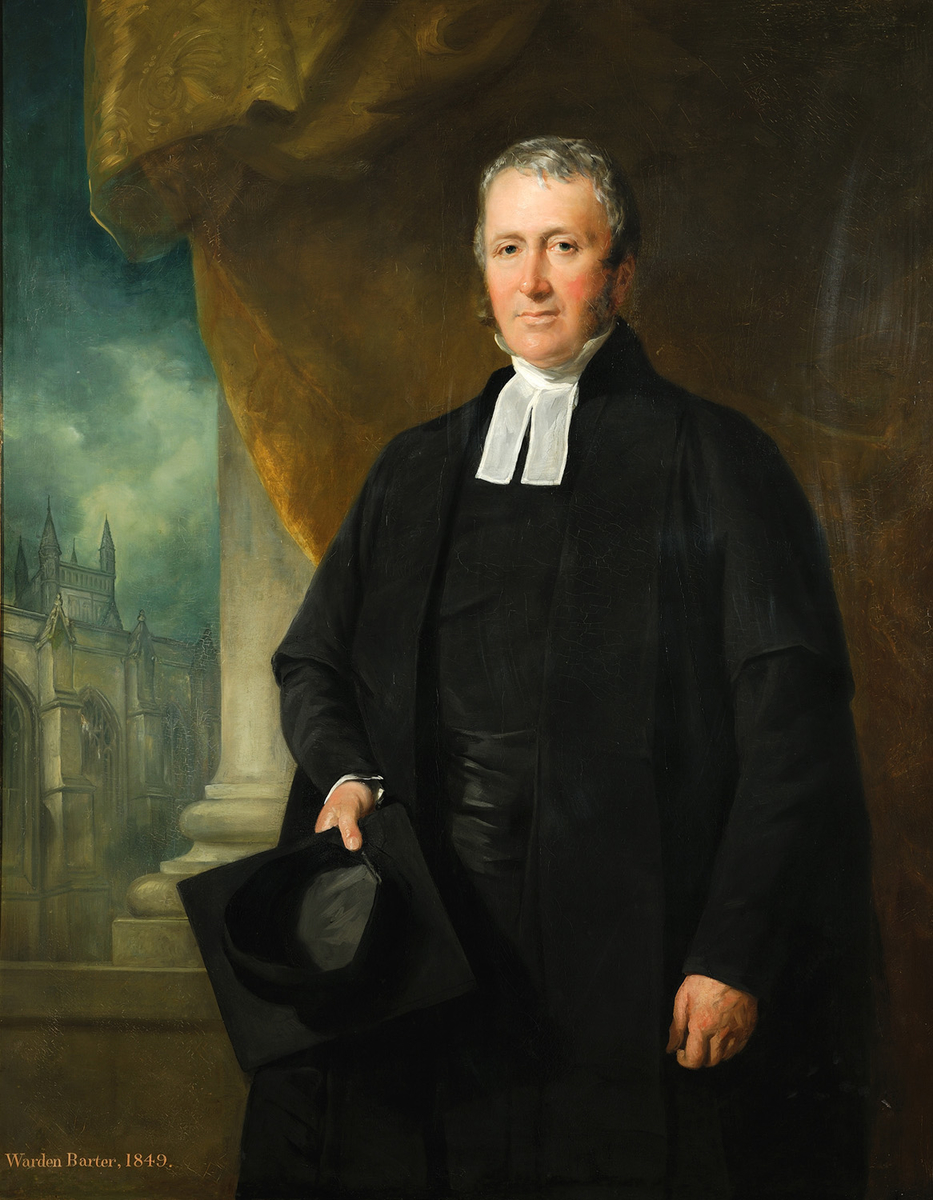
Robert Barter by Francis Grant

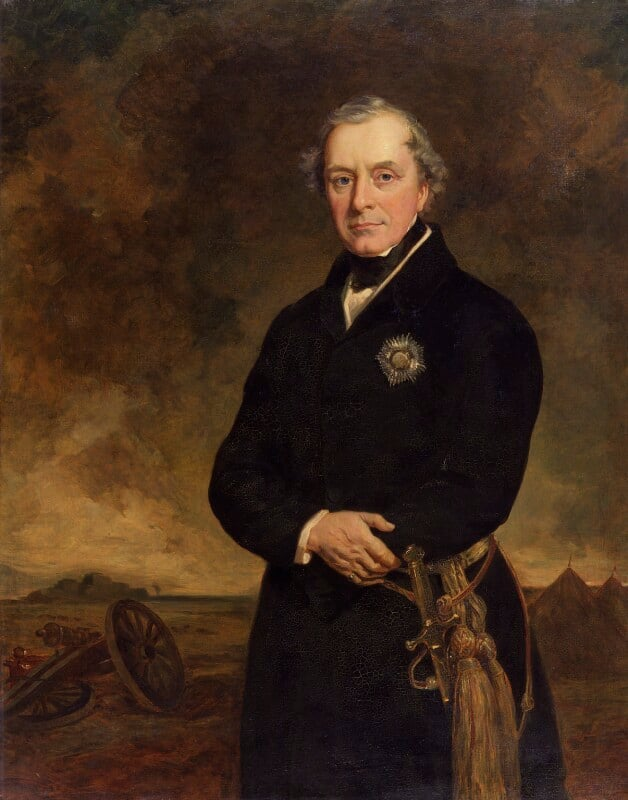
Henry Hardinge by Francis Grant

== Bibliography ==
- Bailey, Anthony. J.M.W. Turner: Standing in the Sun. Tate Enterprises Ltd, 2013.
- Murray, Peter. Daniel Maclise, 1806-1870: Romancing the Past. Crawford Art Gallery, 2009.
- Shanes, Eric. The Life and Masterworks of J.M.W. Turner. Parkstone International, 2012.
- Van der Merwe, Pieter & Took, Roger. The Spectacular career of Clarkson Stanfield. Tyne and Wear County Council Museums, 1979.
- Wills, Catherine. High Society: The Life and Art of Sir Francis Grant, 1803–1878. National Galleries of Scotland, 2003.
