= Macbeth and the Witches =

Painting by Clarkson Stanfield

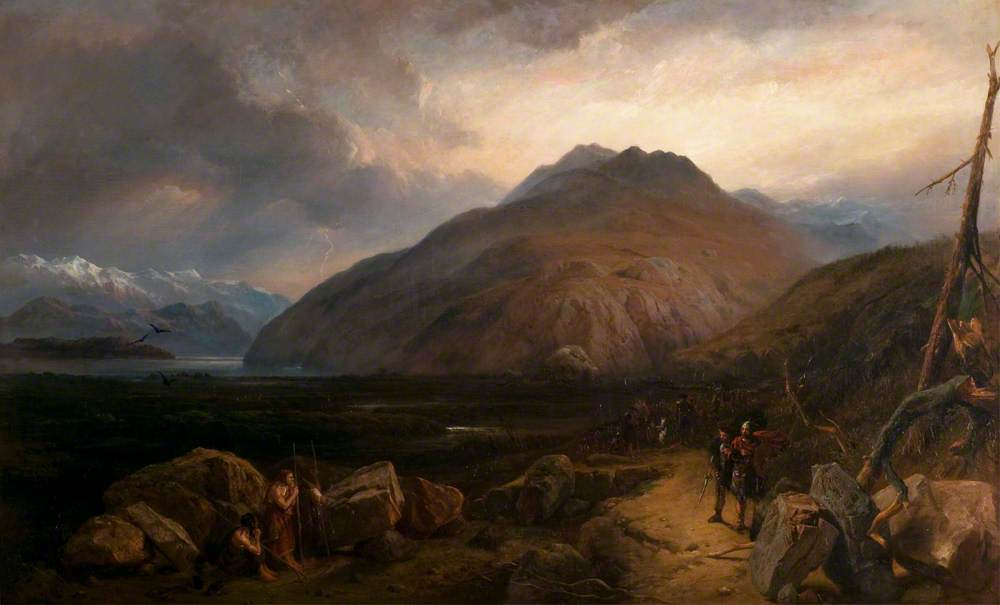
- Artist: Clarkson Stanfield
- Year: 1850
- Medium: Oil on canvas, landscape painting
- Dimensions: 80.6 cm × 132.1 cm (31.7 in × 52.0 in)
- Location: Leicester Museum & Art Gallery, Leicestershire

Macbeth and the Witches is an 1850 oil painting by the British artist Clarkson Stanfield. Combining landscape and history painting it is inspired by William Shakespeare's of the play Macbeth. The scene is of bleak-looking Scottish mountain country. Macbeth is shown accompanied by Banquo is shown approaching the witches, which occurs in Act I, Scene 3 of the play.

The work was commissioned by the engineer Isambard Kingdom Brunel for his gallery of Shakespearean pictures. The painting was displayed at the Royal Academy Exhibition of 1850 at the National Gallery in London where it was reviewed by The Athenaeum. Today the painting is in the collection of the Leicester Museum & Art Gallery, having been acquired in 1890.

== Bibliography ==
- Van der Merwe, Pieter & Took, Roger. The Spectacular career of Clarkson Stanfield. Tyne and Wear County Council Museums, 1979.
- Wright, Christopher, Gordon, Catherine May & Smith, Mary Peskett. British and Irish Paintings in Public Collections: An Index of British and Irish Oil Paintings by Artists Born Before 1870 in Public and Institutional Collections in the United Kingdom and Ireland. Yale University Press, 2006.
