= Mercury Sent to Admonish Aeneas =

Painting by J. M. W. Turner

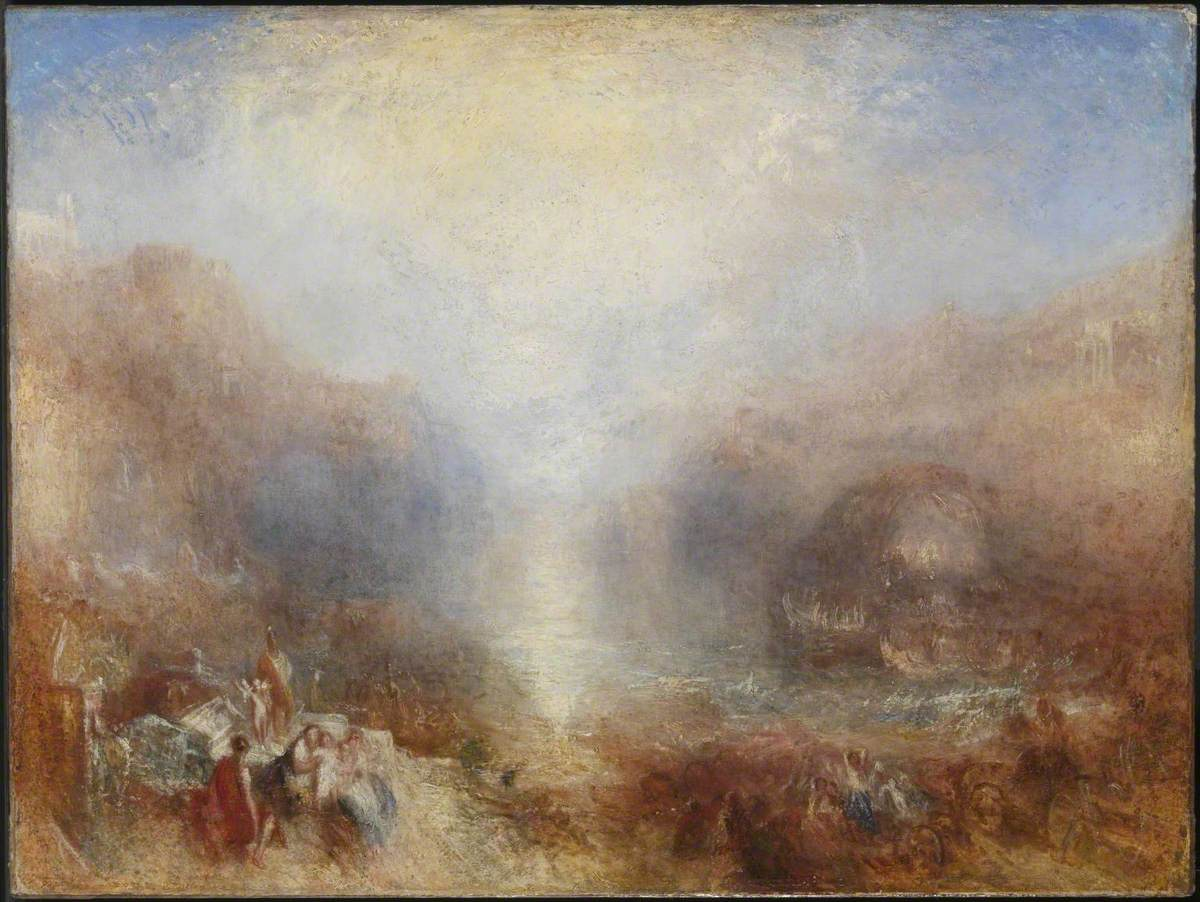
- Artist: J. M. W. Turner
- Year: 1850
- Type: Oil on canvas, history painting
- Dimensions: 120.6 cm × 90.2 cm (47.5 in × 35.5 in)
- Location: Tate Britain, London

Mercury Sent to Admonish Aeneas is an 1850 oil painting by the British artist J.M.W. Turner. Inspired by the epic poem The Aeneid by the Roman writer Virgil. It depicts the god Mercury appearing to the Trojan exile Aeneas during a dream, to rebuke him for lingering at Carthage where he had become the lover of the queen Dido. Characteristic of Turner's later style, his almost abstract emphasis on light and colour is given priority over the elements of traditional landscape and history painting.

Turner was returning to a subject he had used several times earlier in his career. It was one of four paintings on the theme he submitted to the Royal Academy Exhibition of 1850 at the National Gallery in London, his final ever appearance at the annual Summer Exhibition. Part of the 1856 Turner Bequest to the nation, it is now in the collection of the Tate Britain in Pimlico.

== See also ==
- List of paintings by J. M. W. Turner

== Bibliography ==
- Bailey, Anthony. J.M.W. Turner: Standing in the Sun. Tate Enterprises Ltd, 2013.
- Costello, Leo. J.M.W. Turner and the Subject of History. Taylor and Francis, 2017.
- Finley, Gerald. Angel in the Sun; Turner's Vision of History. McGill-Queen's University Press, 1999.
- Herrmann Luke. J. M. W. Turner. Oxford University Press, 2007.
