= The Departure of the Fleet =

Painting by J. M. W. Turner

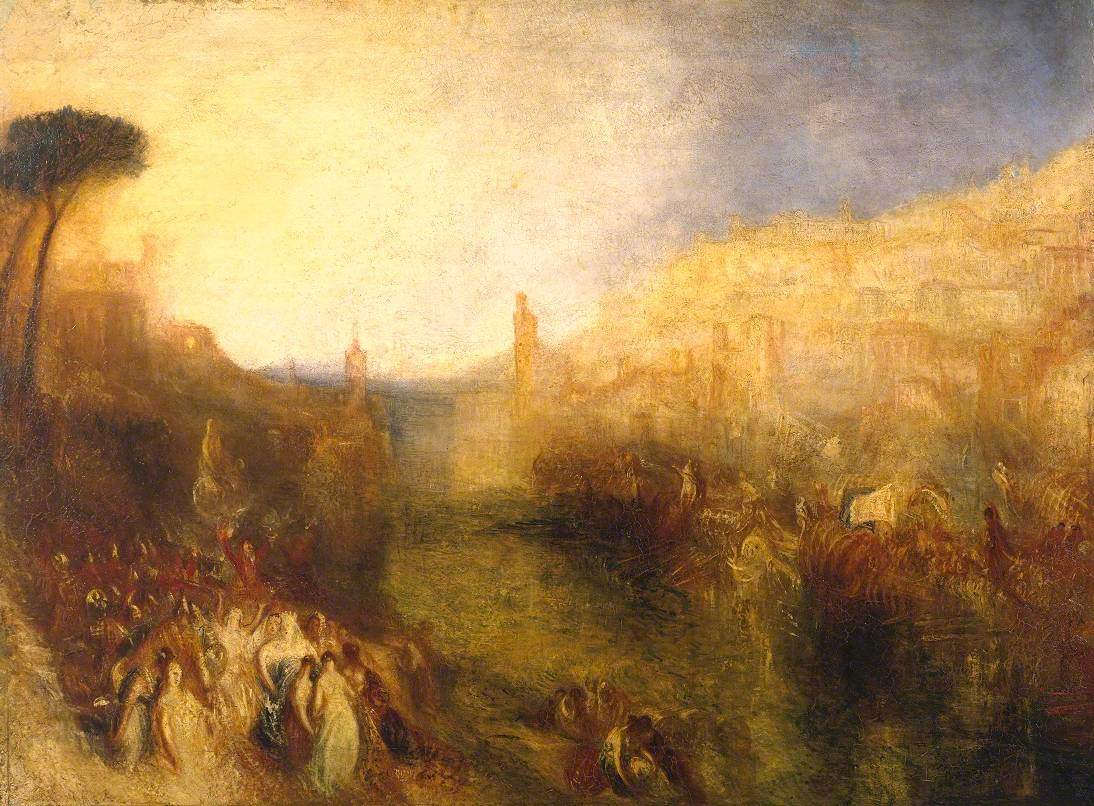
- Artist: J. M. W. Turner
- Year: 1850
- Medium: Oil on canvas
- Dimensions: 120.3 cm × 89.9 cm (47.4 in × 35.4 in)
- Location: Tate Britain, London
- Accession: N00554
- Website: tate.org.uk/art/artworks/turner-the-departure-of-the-fleet-n00554

The Departure of the Fleet is an 1850 history painting by the British artist J.M.W. Turner. Inspired by Classical writings, it depicts the fleet of the Trojan Aeneas departing from Carthage The Carthaginian Queen Dido and her attendants are on the left, watching the departure of the ships.

It was one of four paintings that Turner exhibited at Royal Academy's Summer Exhibition of 1850. Today it is in the collection of the Tate Britain, having been part of the Turner Bequest of 1856.

== See also ==
- List of paintings by J. M. W. Turner

== Bibliography ==
- Bailey, Anthony. J.M.W. Turner: Standing in the Sun. Tate Enterprises Ltd, 2013.
- Beckett, R.B. John Constable and the Fishers: The Record of a Friendship. Taylor & Francis, 2023.
- Costello, Leo. J.M.W. Turner and the Subject of History. Taylor and Francis, 2017.
- Finley, Gerald. Angel in the Sun; Turner's Vision of History. McGill-Queen's University Press, 1999.
- Herrmann Luke. J. M. W. Turner. Oxford University Press, 2007
- Moorby, Nicola. Turner and Constable: Art, Life, Landscape. Yale University Press, 2025.
- Shanes, Eric. The Life and Masterworks of J.M.W. Turner. Parkstone International, 2012.
- Vance, Norman. The Victorians and Ancient Rome. John Wiley & Sons, 1997.
