= Samson Betrayed =

Painting by Frederick Richard Pickersgill

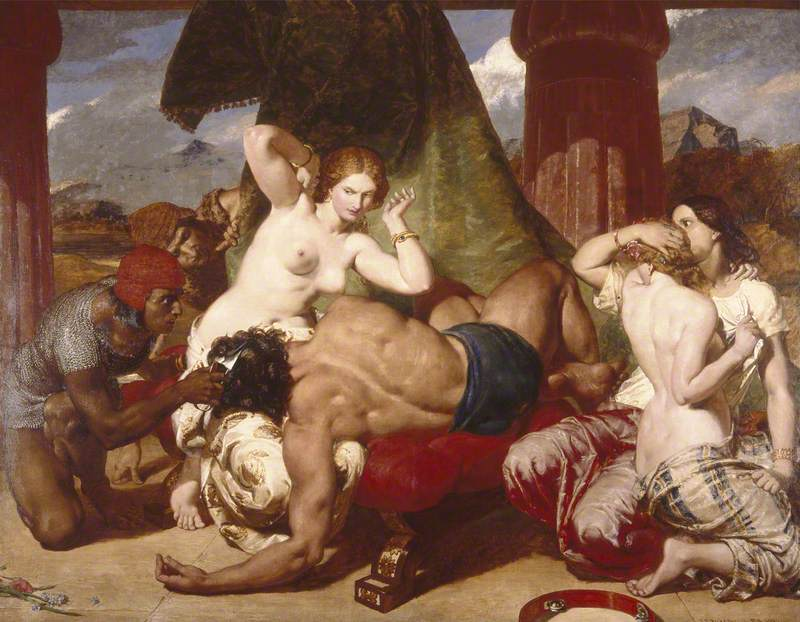
- Artist: Frederick Richard Pickersgill
- Year: 1850
- Type: Oil on canvas, history painting
- Dimensions: 243.8 cm × 306 cm (96.0 in × 120 in)
- Location: Manchester Art Gallery, Greater Manchester

Samson Betrayed is an 1850 oil painting by the British artist Frederick Richard Pickersgill. It is a biblical history painting depicting the moment when the sleeping Samson is betrayed by his lover Delilah whose allies rush forwards to cut his hair, the source of his strength. The picture's composition shows the strong influence of the nude-heavy historical and religious scenes of William Etty.

Pickersgill was the nephew of the celebrated portraitist Henry William Pickersgill, a rival of Thomas Lawrence, and was himself elected to the Royal Academy. The painting was displayed at the Royal Academy Exhibition of 1850 held at the National Gallery in London. Today it is the collection of Manchester Art Gallery, having been acquired originally by the Royal Manchester Institution and transferred on 1882.

== Bibliography ==
- Boase, Thomas Sherrer Ross. English Art, 1800-1870. Clarendon Press, 1959.
