= Mr Honeywood Introduces the Bailiffs to Miss Richland as His Friends =

Painting by William Powell Frith

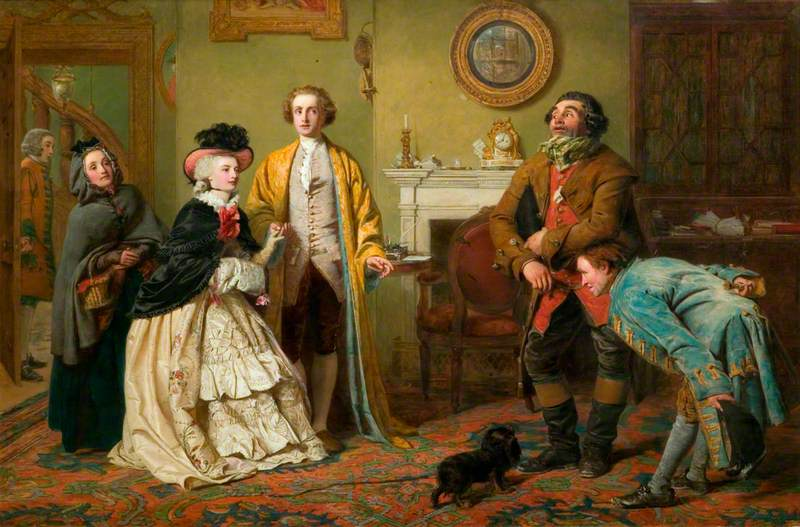
- Artist: William Powell Frith
- Year: 1850
- Type: Oil on canvas, genre painting
- Dimensions: 71.1 cm × 104.2 cm (28.0 in × 41.0 in)
- Location: Victoria and Albert Museum, London

Mr Honeywood Introduces the Bailiffs to Miss Richland as His Friends is an 1850 oil painting by the British artist William Powell Frith. It depicts a scene from the 1768 comedy play The Good-Natur'd Man by the Irish author Oliver Goldsmith. The amiable Mr Honeywood has run up large debts by his generosity, and the bailiffs have come to secure his property until he can pay off his debts. When he is visited by his wealthy love interest Miss Richland, he dresses them up in his own clothes and tries to pass them off as his friends. Costume pictures featuring scenes from established literature were popular during the early Victorian era.

The painting was displayed at the Royal Academy Exhibition of 1850 held at the National Gallery in London. It was subsequently also displayed at the Salon of 1855 in Paris, part of the Exposition Universelle. Charles Dickens particularly praised it after visiting the Salon. Frith was awarded a gold medal by the French authorities for his submissions. Acquired by the art collector John Sheepshanks, the painting was donated by him in 1857 as part of the large Sheepshanks Gift.

== Bibliography ==
- Bills, Mark. Dickens and the Artists. Yale University Press, 2012.
- Bills, Mark & Knight, Vivien (ed.) William Powell Frith: Painting the Victorian Age. Yale University Press, 2006
- Green, Richard & Sellars, Jane. William Powell Frith: The People's Painter. Bloomsbury, 2019.
- Roe, Sonia. Oil Paintings in Public Ownership in the Victoria and Albert Museum. Public Catalogue Foundation, 2008.
