= William Edward Frost =

English painter

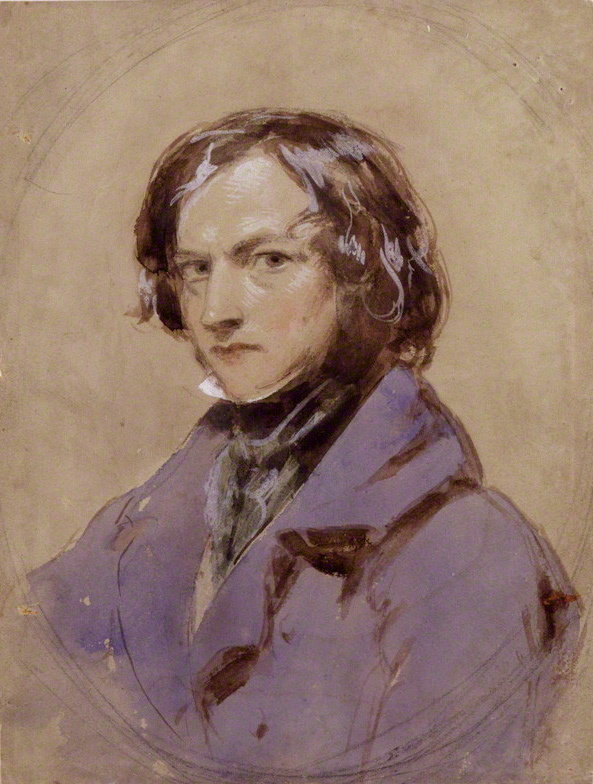
William Edward Frost (self-portrait), 1839.

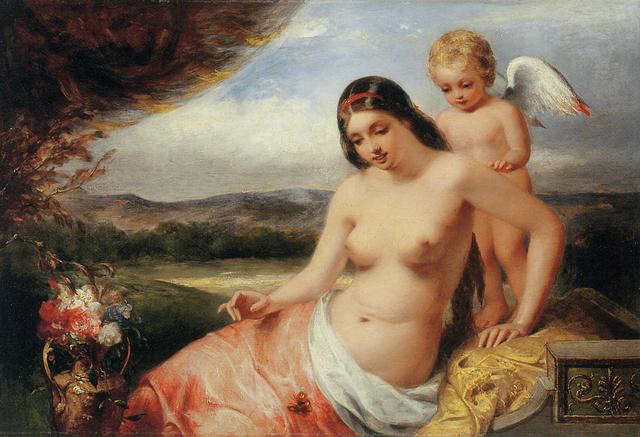
Venus and Cupid

William Edward Frost (September 1810 – 4 June 1877) was an English painter of the Victorian era. Virtually alone among English artists in the middle Victorian period, he devoted his practice to the portrayal of the female nude.

Frost was educated in the schools of the Royal Academy, beginning in 1829; he established a reputation as a portrait painter before branching into historical and mythological subjects, including the subgenre of fairy painting that was characteristic of Victorian art. In 1839 he won the Royal Academy's gold medal for his Prometheus Bound, and in 1843 he won a prize in the Westminster Hall competition for his Una Alarmed by Fauns (a subject from Spenser's The Faerie Queene). He was elected an associate member of the Royal Academy in 1846, and a full member in 1870.

Frost is widely recognized as a follower of William Etty, who preceded him as the primary British painter of nudes in the second quarter of the nineteenth century. Despite the prudishness of the Victorian era, Frost's relatively chaste nudes were popular, and his career was financially successful.

Sabrina and the Nymphs, 1845

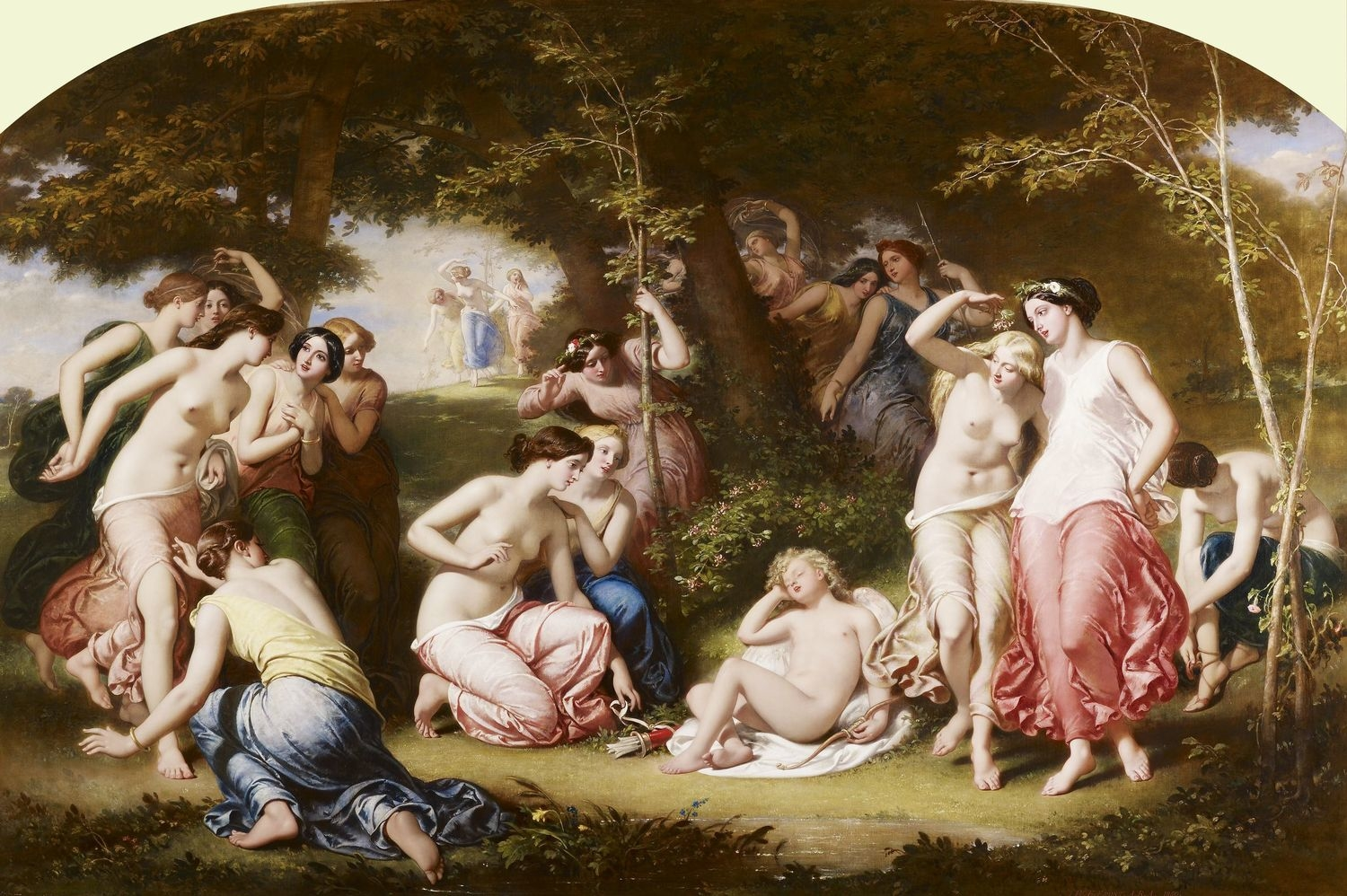
The Disarming of Cupid, 1850

At their best Frost's works have a distinctive jewel-like charm, his attractive young women models possessing a pert, self-conscious quality which makes them more titillating than Etty's powerful studies....

—Lionel Lambourne, Victorian Painting
