= A Dream of Venice =

Painting by James Clarke Hook

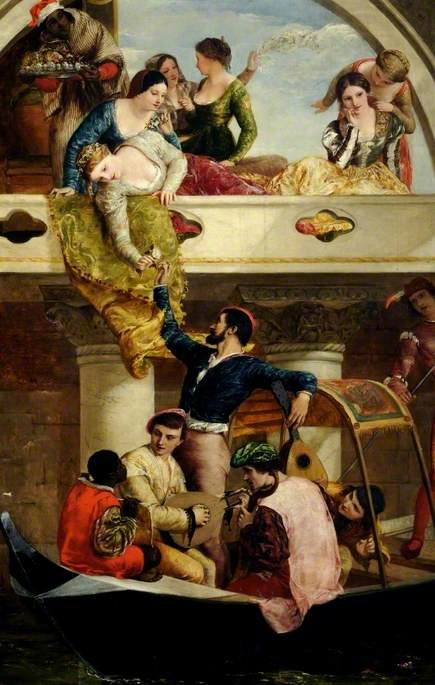
- Artist: James Clarke Hook
- Year: 1850
- Type: Oil on canvas, genre painting
- Dimensions: 124.7 cm × 80.5 cm (49.1 in × 31.7 in)
- Location: Graves Art Gallery, Sheffield

A Dream of Venice is an 1850 oil painting by the British artist James Clarke Hook. A historical genre painting, it depicts a Renaissance era scene aboard a gondola in the canals of the Republic of Venice where a group of young men sereande ladies on a balcony with music. Stylistically it draws on the influence of the Italian Renaissance painter Paolo Veronese of the Venetian School.

After winning a scholarship award in 1846 Hook had spent three years travelling around Italy studying art and much of his early work reflects this. Significantly this painting moved his away from the tradition of heroic history pictures, as it depicts no recognisable figures. The painting was displayed at the Royal Academy Exhibition of 1850 held at the National Gallery in London, along with a quote from Francesco Sansovino. It later belonged to the art collector Sir Wilson Mappin who in 1925 bequeathed it to the city of Sheffield where is now in the collection of the Graves Art Gallery.

== Bibliography ==
- French, Harry Willard. Gems of Genius: Famous Painters and Their Pictures. Lee and Shepard, 1880.
- McMaster, Juliet. James Clarke Hook: Painter of the Sea. McGill-Queen's University Press, 2023.
