= Interior of Saint-Gommaire, Lierre =

Painting by David Roberts

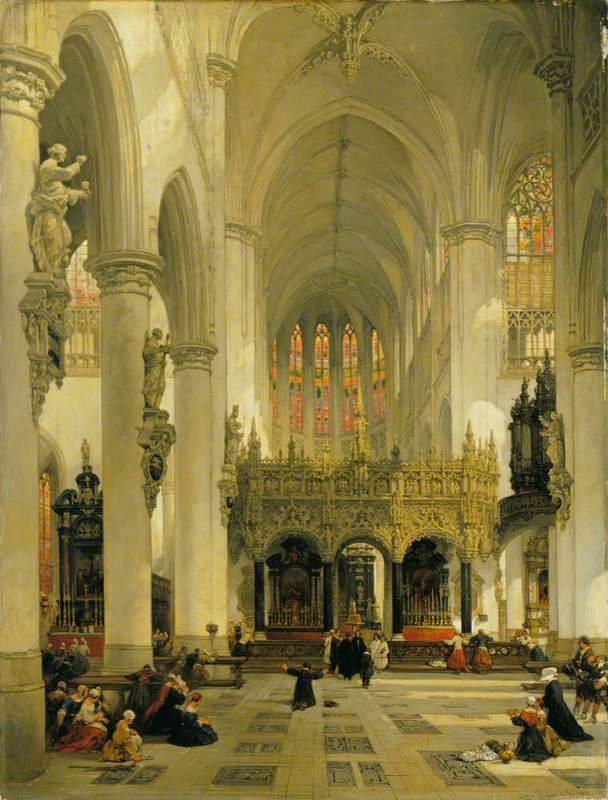
- Artist: David Roberts
- Year: 1850
- Type: Oil on canvas, landscape painting
- Dimensions: 121.8 cm × 94 cm (48.0 in × 37 in)
- Location: Wallace Collection, London

Interior of Saint-Gommaire, Lierre is an 1850 oil painting by the British artist David Roberts. It depicts the nave of the Church of Saint-Gommaire at Lier, near Antwerp. in Belgium. Noted for his Gothic architecture, the church takes its name from the town's patron saint Gommaire. Roberts paid a number of visits to Belgium during his career. Like other church interiors he produced it echoes the style of such scenes in the Dutch Golden Age art.

It was one of two paintings produced by Roberts depicting the church (the other Shrine of Saint Gomar at Lierre, is now in the (Harris Museum in Preston) It was displayed at the Royal Academy Exhibition of 1850 at the National Gallery in London. Initially owned by the whaling tycoon Elhanan Bicknell, It is now in the Wallace Collection, having been bought by the Marquess of Hertford in 1863.

== Bibliography ==
- Bumpus, Thomas Francis. The Cathedrals and Churches of Belgium. T. Werner Laurie, 1928.
- George, Victoria. Whitewash and the New Aesthetic of the Protestant Reformation. Pindar Press, 2012.
- Guiterman, Helen. David Roberts, 1796-1864, Artist, Adventurer. Scottish Arts Council, 1981.
- Sim, Katherine. David Roberts R.A., 1796–1864: A Biography. Quartet Books, 1984.
