= The Good Samaritan (Eastlake) =

Painting by Charles Lock Eastlake

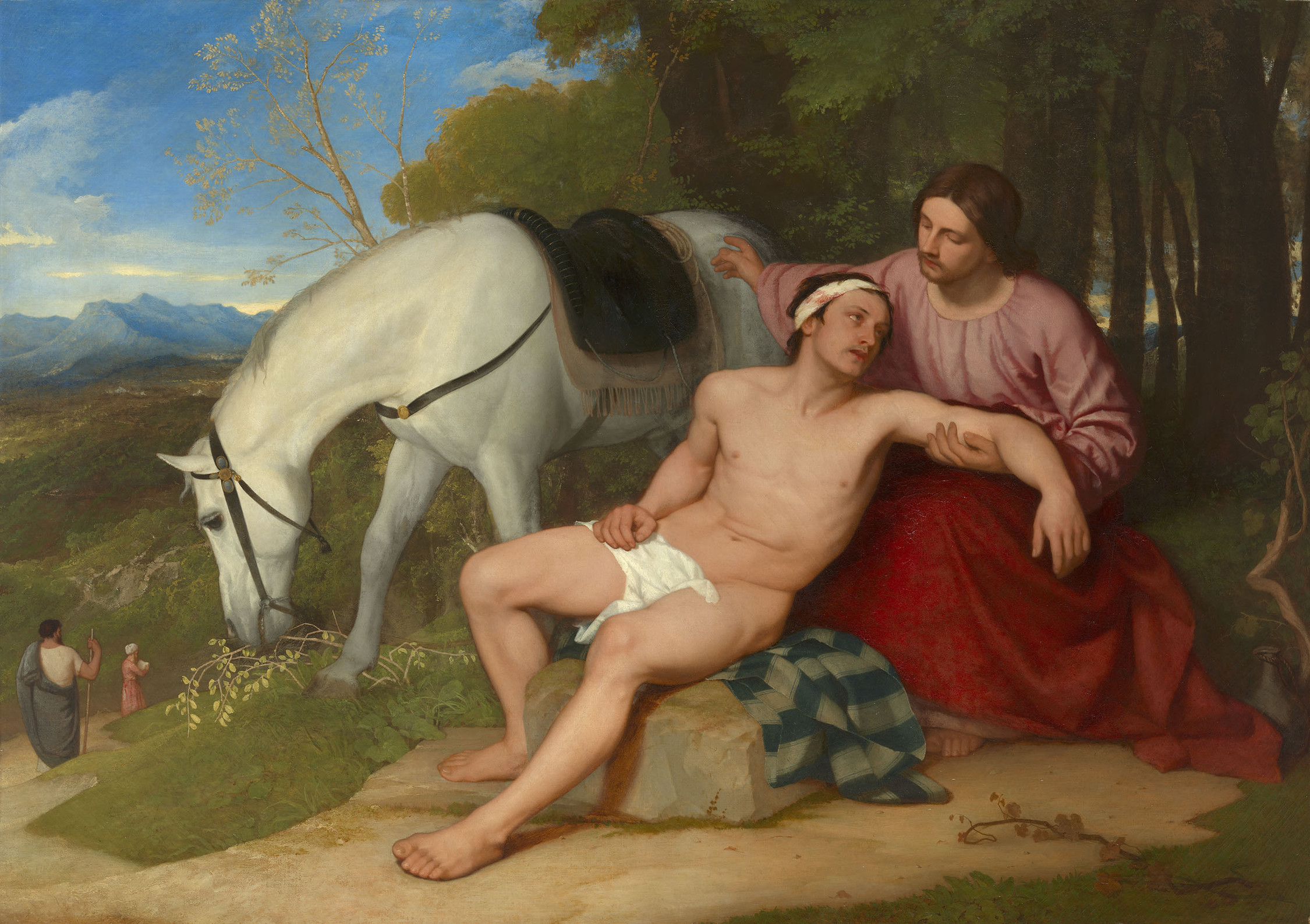
- Artist: Charles Lock Eastlake
- Year: 1850
- Type: Oil on canvas, religious painting
- Dimensions: 111.7 cm × 157.8 cm (44.0 in × 62.1 in)
- Location: Osborne House, Isle of Wight

The Good Samaritan is an 1850 oil painting by the British artist Charles Lock Eastlake. It depicts the biblical story of The Good Samaritan. In theme and composition bears a resemblance to Eastlake's 1842 painting Hagar and ishmael.

The painting was commissioned by Prince Albert for the Royal Collection. Eastlake had spent many years living in Rome and was strongly influenced by Italian art, particularly Titian. The same year he produced the painting he was elected as President of the Royal Academy in succession to Martin Archer Shee. The painting was displayed at the Royal Academy Exhibition of 1850 held at the National Gallery in London. Today the painting is at Osborne House on the Isle of Wight.

== Bibliography ==
- Giebelhausen, Michaela. Painting the Bible: Representation and Belief in Mid-Victorian Britain. Taylor & Francis, 2017.
- Monkhouse, Cosmo. Pictures by Sir Charles Eastlake. Virtue, Spalding, 1876.
