= Berengaria's Alarm =

Painting by Charles Allston Collins

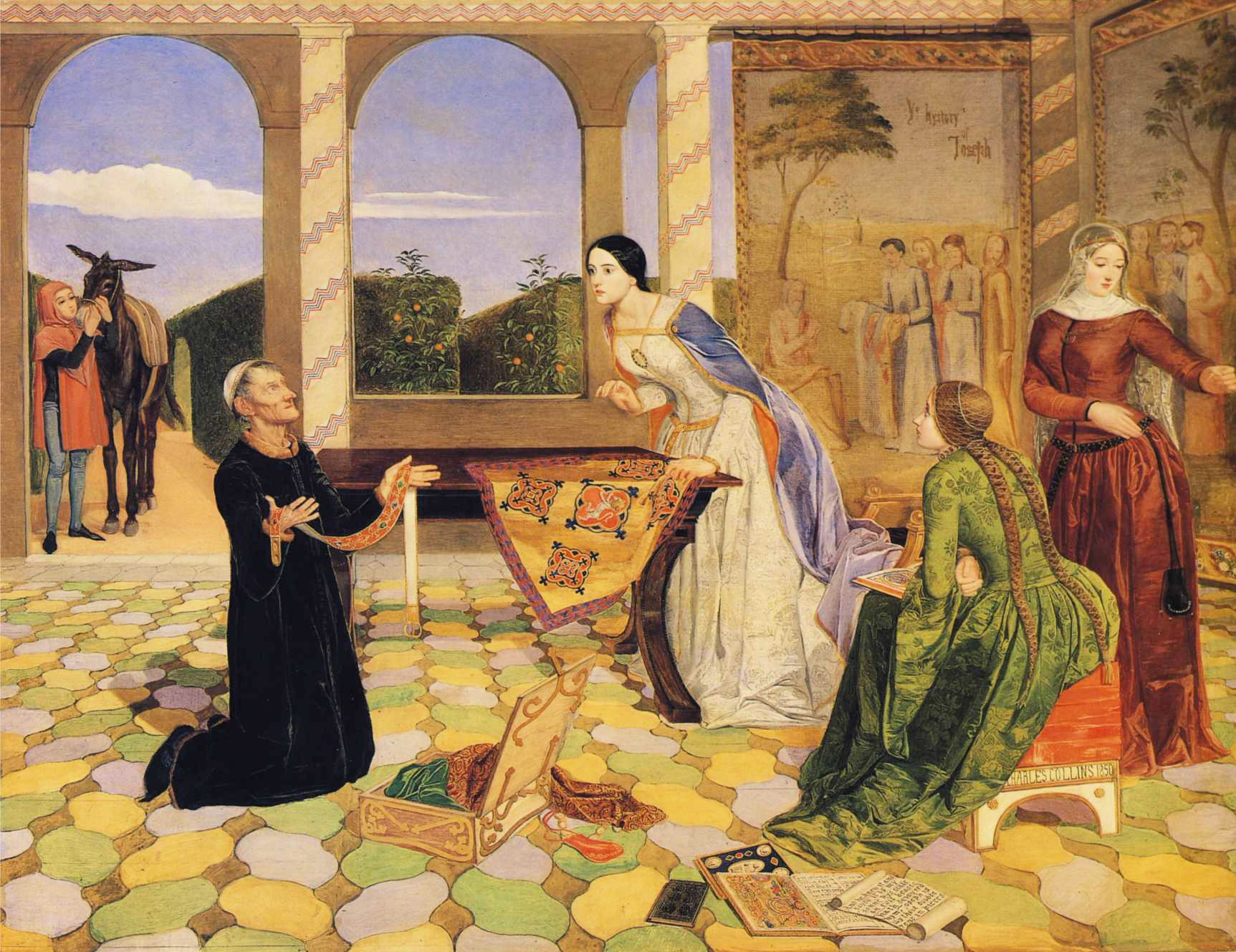
- Artist: Charles Allston Collins
- Year: 1850
- Type: Oil on canvas, history painting
- Dimensions: 101.2 cm × 106.7 cm (39.8 in × 42.0 in)
- Location: Manchester Art Gallery, Greater Manchester

Berengaria's Alarm is an 1850 oil painting by the British artist Charles Allston Collins. It shows Berengaria of Navarre, the wife of Richard I, alarmed when a travelling pedlar offers her husband's jewelled belt to her for sale. She realises some danger has come to him - returning from the Third Crusade he has been captured and imprisoned by the Duke of Austria. The tapestry in the background echoes this with the biblical story of Joseph's brothers showing their father his coat to prove he is dead. It is also known as The Pedlar.

Collins was the son of the noted artist William Collins and the brother of the author Wilkie Collins. He was closely associated with the Pre-Raphaelite Brotherhood movement in Victorian painting.

The painting was displayed at the Royal Academy Exhibition of 1850 held at the National Gallery in London. Today the woke is part of the collection of Manchester Art Gallery, having been acquired in 1896.

== Bibliography ==
- Bury, Stephen (ed.) Benezit Dictionary of British Graphic Artists and Illustrators, Volume 1. OUP, 2012.
- Harding, James. The Pre-Raphaelites. Academy Editions, 1977.
- Treuherz, Julian. Pre-Raphaelite Paintings from Manchester City Art Galleries. Manchester City Art Gallery, 1993.
