= King James Receiving News of the Landing of William of Orange =

Painting by Edward Matthew Ward

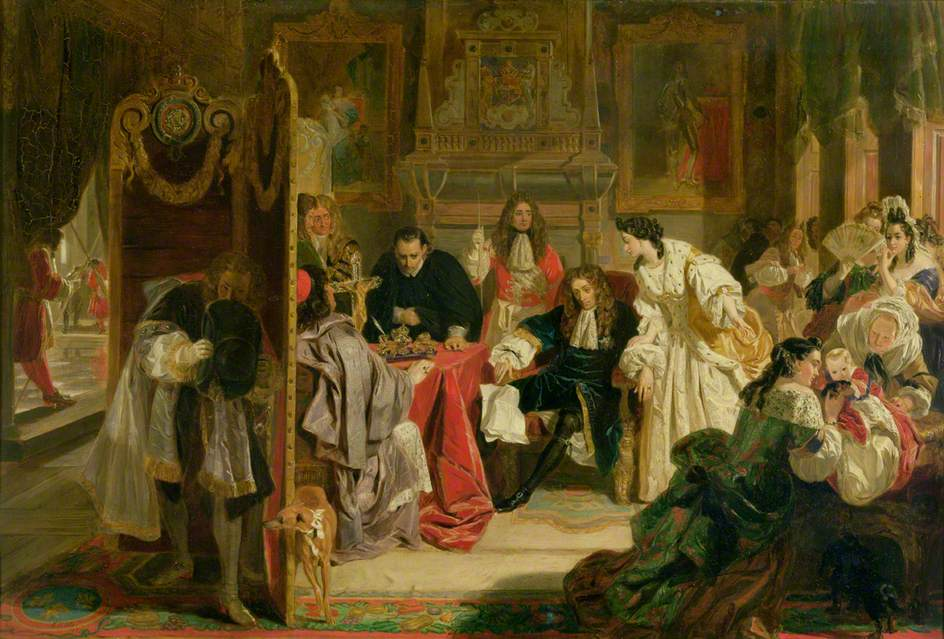
- Version in Towneley Hall
- Artist: Edward Matthew Ward
- Year: 1850
- Type: Oil on canvas, history painting
- Dimensions: 120.6 cm × 182.8 cm (47.5 in × 72.0 in)
- Location: Tate Britain, London

King James Receiving News of the Landing of William of Orange is an oil on canvas history painting by the British artist Edward Matthew Ward, from 1850. It is held at the Tate Britain, in London.

== History and description ==
It depicts a moment from the Glorious Revolution of 1688, when James II is informed at Whitehall Palace, in London, that his nephew and rival William, Prince of Orange has landed with an army in Devon. The crouching figure of the king listening in emphasises the air of conspiracy that led to the collapse of the king's cause and led him to flee into exile in France where he was the figurehead of the Jacobite movement. In addition to the king, the painting features his wife, Mary of Modena, and his infant son and heir, James Francis Edward Stuart, who would continue the Jacobite claim throughout his life. To the left, a priest and a seated bishop can be seen, while a crucifix stands as a symbol of the Catholic faith of the king and his wife.

The painting was displayed at the Royal Academy Exhibition of 1850 held at the National Gallery, in London. It is now in the collection of the Tate Britain, having been presented to the nation by the art collector Jacob Bell in 1859. In 1851 Ward produced a smaller replica, which is now at the Towneley Hall Art Gallery, in Burnley.

An engraving based on the painting was produced by Frederick Heath, in 1867, a copy of which is now in the British Museum, in London.

== Bibliography ==
- Dafforne, James. The Life and Works of Edward Matthew Ward. Virtue and Company, 1879.
