= Susanna at her Bath =

Painting by Francesco Hayez

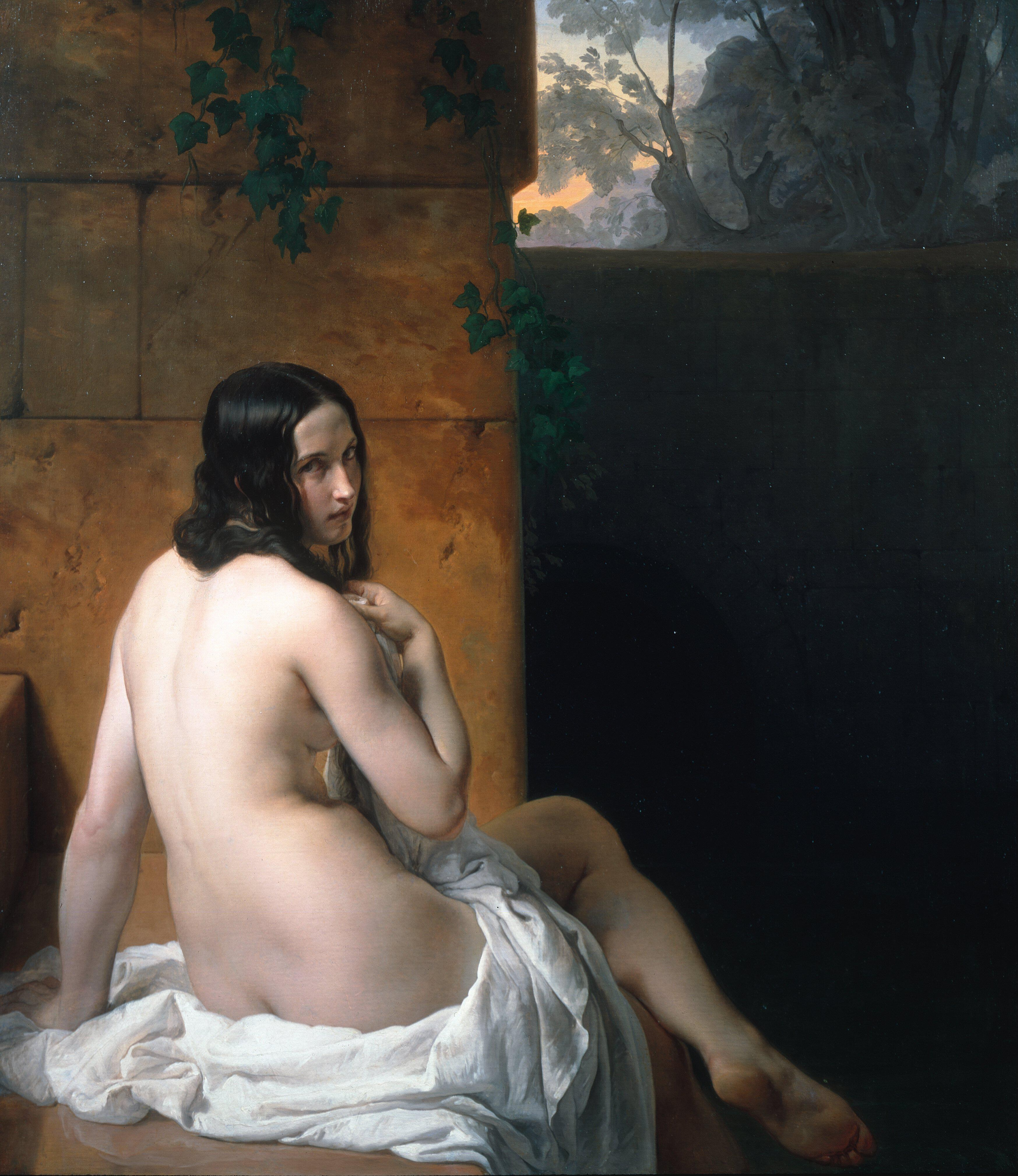
- Artist: Francesco Hayez
- Year: 1850
- Type: Oil on canvas, religious art
- Dimensions: 138 cm × 122 cm (54 in × 48 in)
- Location: National Gallery; London

Susanna at her Bath is an 1850 religious history painting by the Italian artist Francesco Hayez. It depicts the biblical figure of Susanna in a nude scene. Drawn from the story of Susanna and the Elders, it was a popular subject for artists from the Renaissance era onwards. Although Hayez does not depict the old men watching Susanna as she is bathing, their presence is suggested by her startled expression as she looks over her shoulder. Today, the painting is in a private collection, but as of early 2026 was on loan to the National Gallery, London, where it was not on display.

== Bibliography ==
- Grillo, Jennie. Daniel After Babylon: The Additions in the History of Interpretation. Oxford University Press, 2024.
- Mazzocca, Fernando. Francesco Hayez: catalogo ragionato. F. Motta, 1994.
- Philpot, Elizabeth. Old Testament Apocryphal Images in European Art. Acta Universitatis Gothoburgensis, 2009.
