= A Dialogue at Waterloo =

Painting by Edwin Landseer

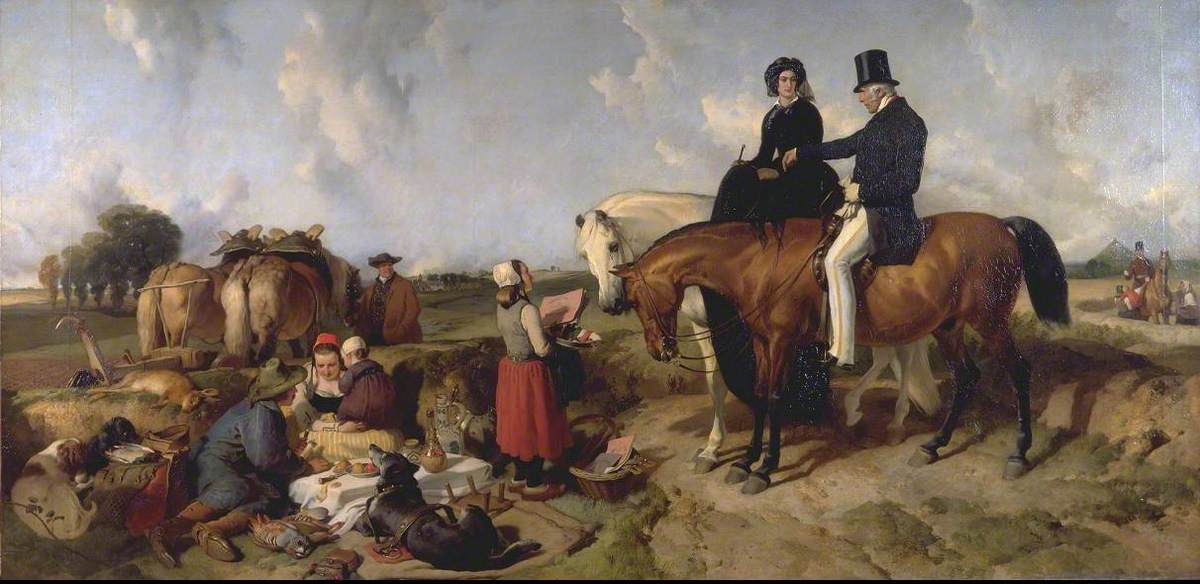
- Artist: Edwin Landseer
- Year: 1850
- Type: Oil on canvas, history painting
- Dimensions: 193.7 cm × 388 cm (76.3 in × 153 in)
- Location: Tate Britain, London

A Dialogue at Waterloo is an 1850 history painting by the British artist Edwin Landseer. It depicts the elderly Duke of Wellington visiting the battlefield of Waterloo in Belgium many decades after he led Allied forces to victory there in 1815. He is shown on horseback in the company of his daughter-in-law Marchioness of Douro. A young woman selling souvenirs of the battle attempts to attract his interest. The artist David Roberts was the model for the Belgian farmer in the background.

It was a visit drawn from the artist's own imagination Landseer visited Belgium during his preparation for the painting. It was displayed at the Royal Academy's Summer Exhibition of 1850 at the National Gallery where it was one of the most popular works on display. Before it was completed the painting had been bought by Robert Vernon as a gift to the nation. Today it is in the collection of the Tate Britain.

== Bibliography ==
- Bury, Stephen (ed.) Benezit Dictionary of British Graphic Artists and Illustrators, Volume 1. OUP, 2012.
- Harrington, Peter. British Artists and War: The Face of Battle in Paintings and Prints, 1700-1914. Greenhill Books, 1993.
- Ormond, Richard. Sir Edwin Landseer. Philadelphia Museum of Art, 1981.
