= Salon of 1850 =

1850 art exhibition in Paris

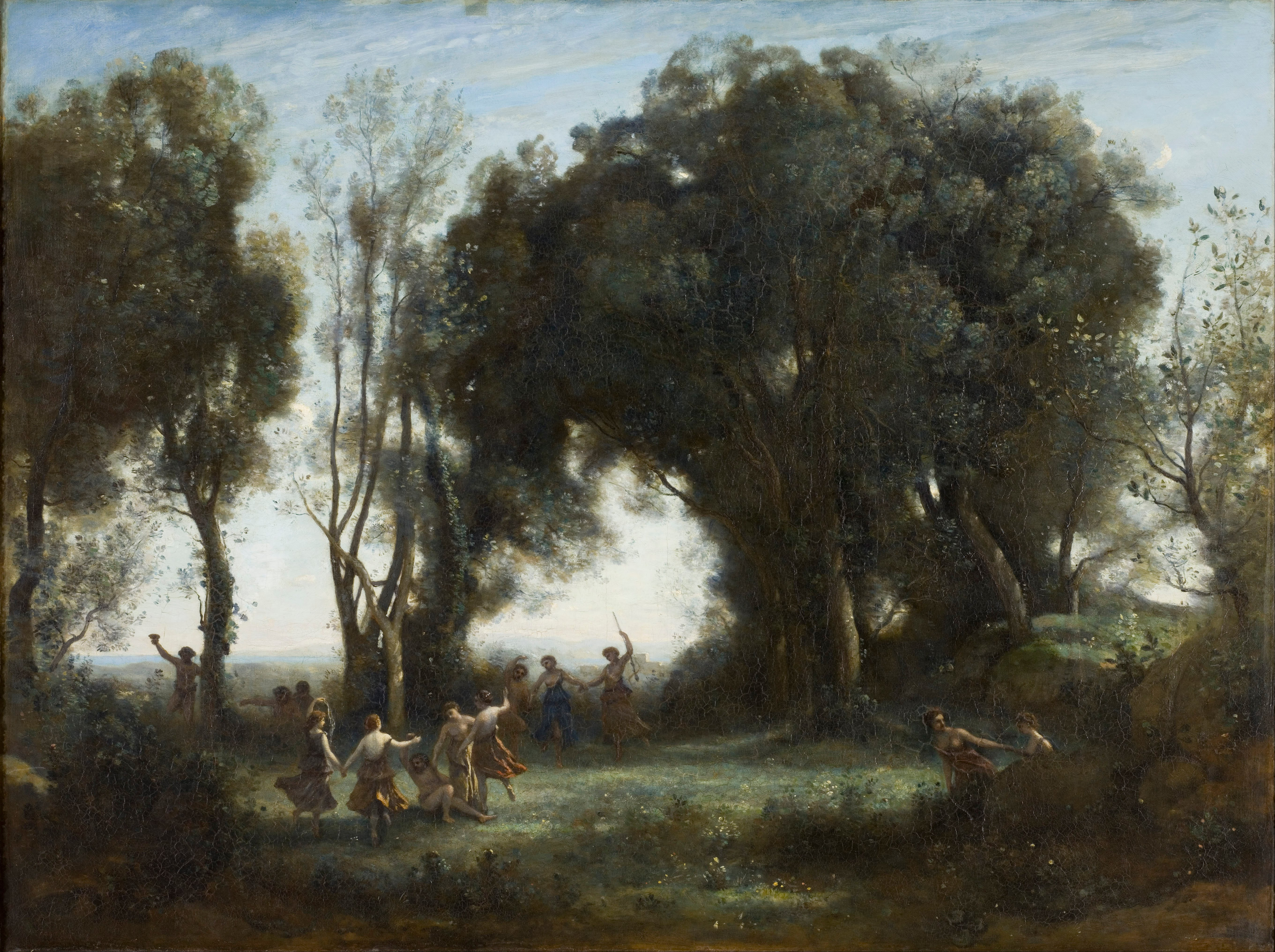
The Dance of the Nymphs by Camille Corot

The Salon of 1850 was an art exhibition held at the Palais-Royal in Paris between 30 December 1850 and 6 March 1851. Part of the tradition of annual Salons organised by the Academy of Fine Arts, it took place during the French Second Republic. It is also sometimes referred to as the Salon of 1851.

The Palais-Royal had previously been the residence of the Louis Philippe I before his overthrow in the French Revolution of 1848. The Romantic painter Théodore Chassériau displayed the Orientalist Arab Horsemen Carrying Away Their Dead. He also displayed a painting of Desdemona from William Shakespeare's Othello. Camille Corot submitted The Dance of the Nymphs while the Realist Gustave Courbet exhibited The Stone Breakers, later destroyed in the Bombing of Dresden in 1945. He also displayed his well-known work A Burial at Ornans.

In sculpture Antoine-Louis Barye exhibited the bronze statues Lapith Combating a Centaur and Theseus and the Minotaur which he had completed several years earlier. Jean-François Soitoux displayed a statue representing a female personification of the new French republic.

== Gallery ==
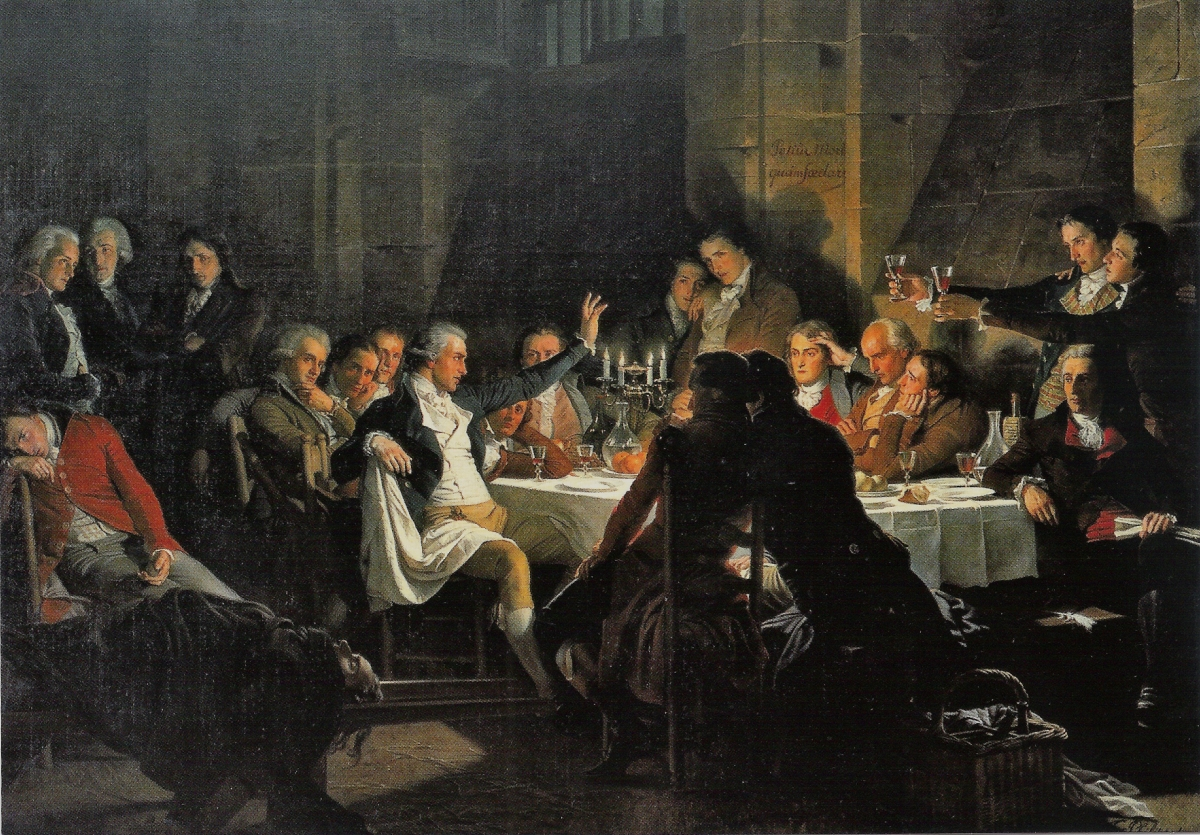
The Last Banquet of the Girondins by Henri Félix Emmanuel Philippoteaux

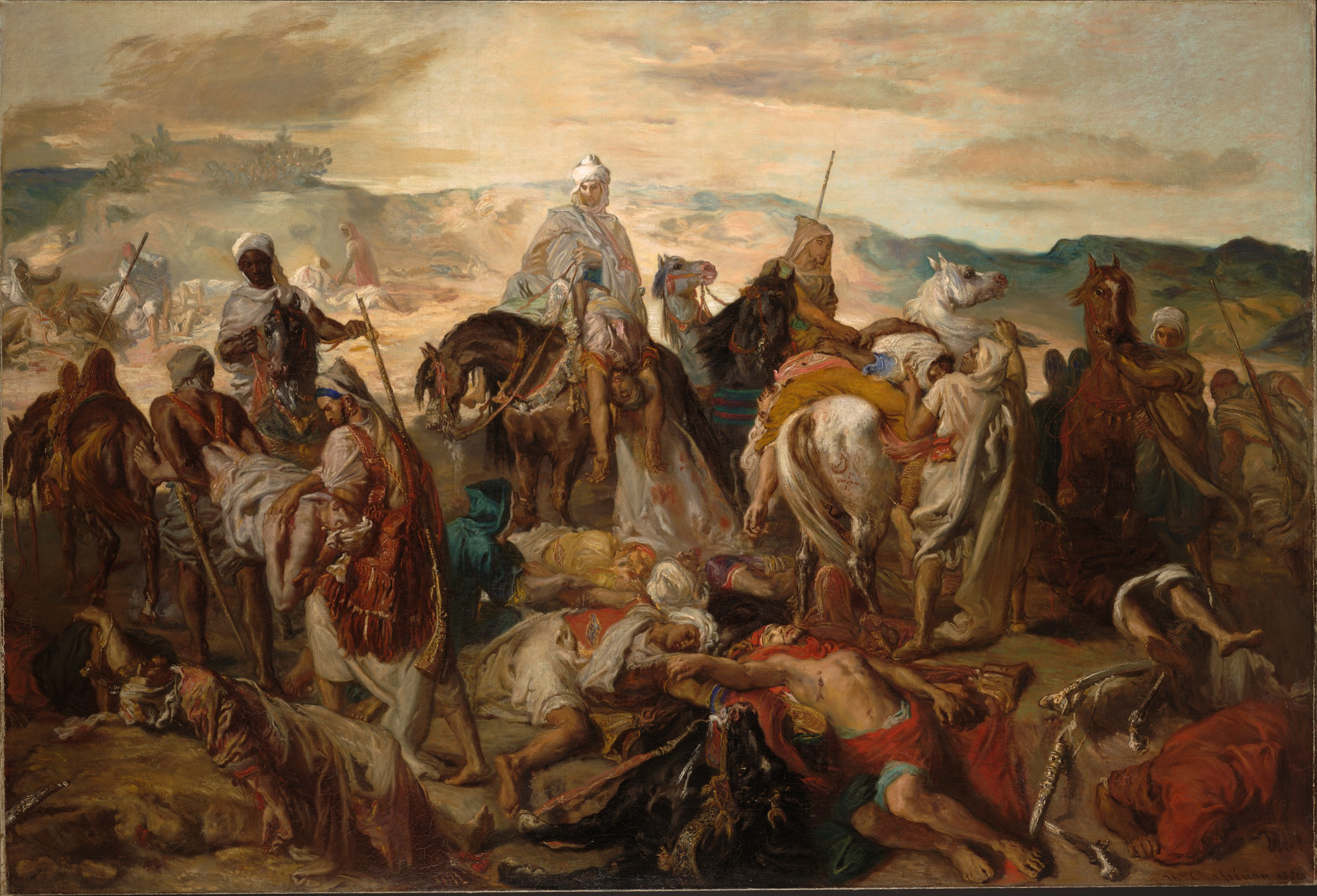
Arab Horsemen Carrying Away Their Dead by Théodore Chassériau

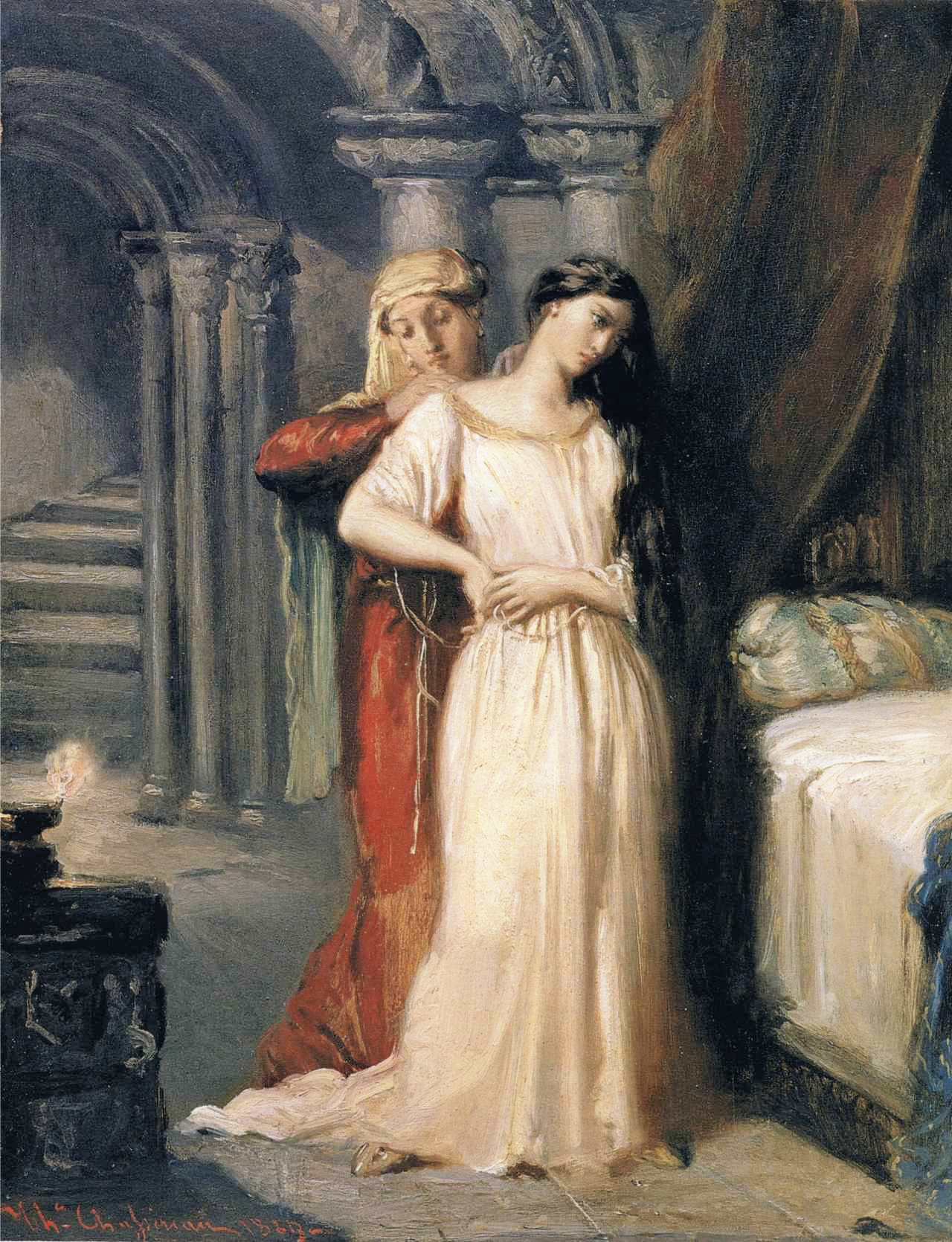
Desdemona Retiring to her Bed by Théodore Chassériau

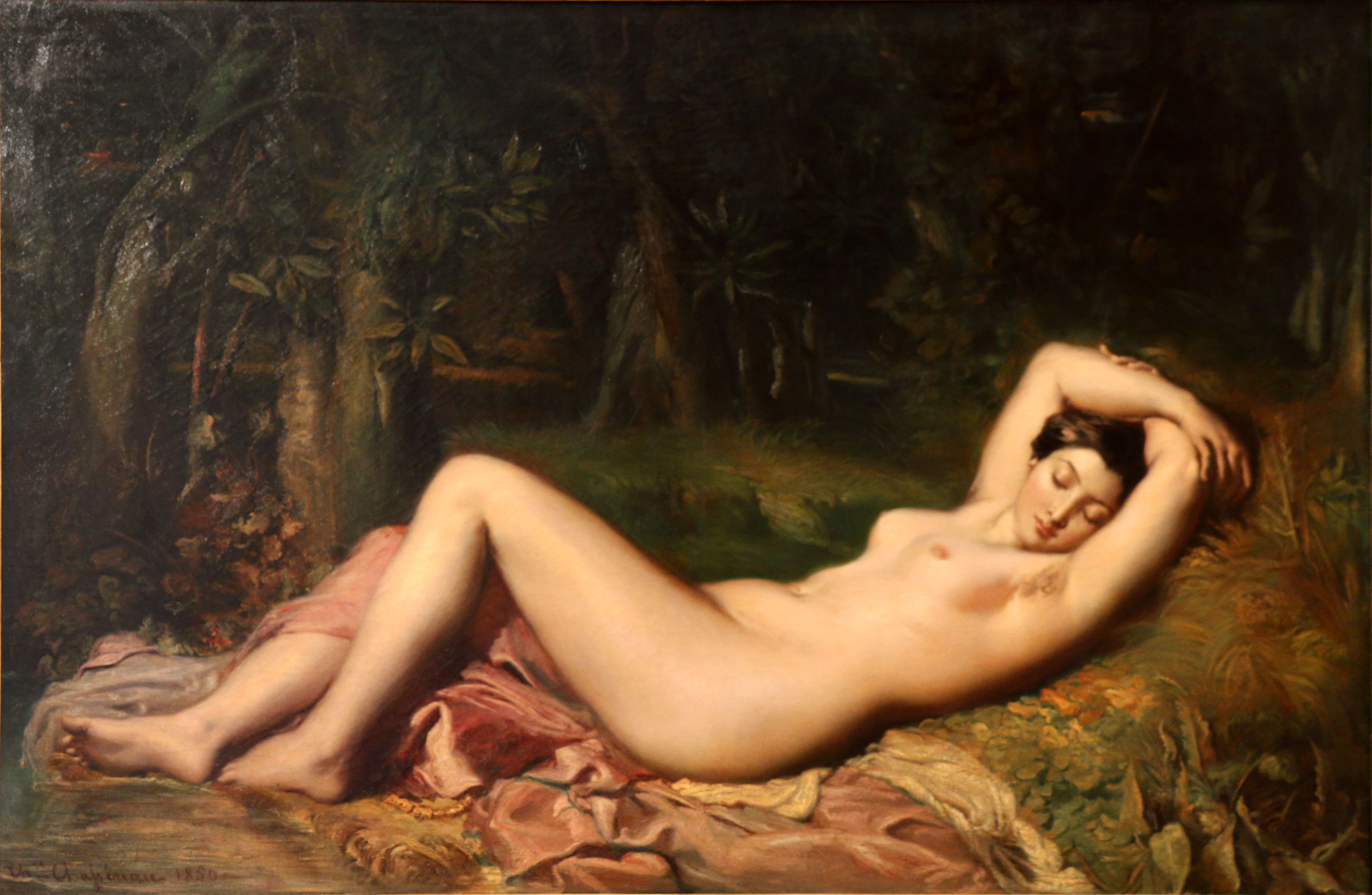
Bather Sleeping Near a Spring by Théodore Chassériau

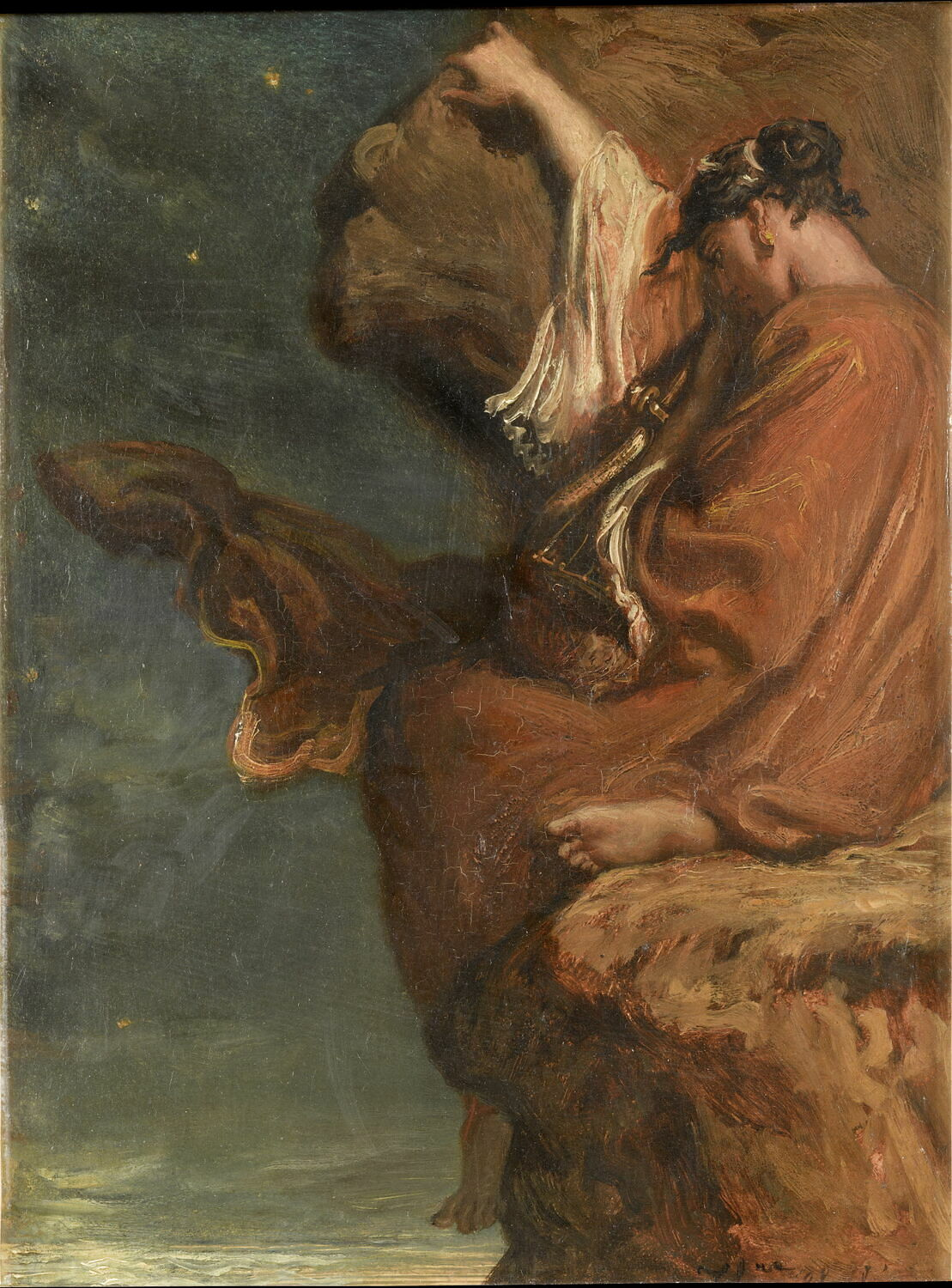
Sapho by Théodore Chassériau

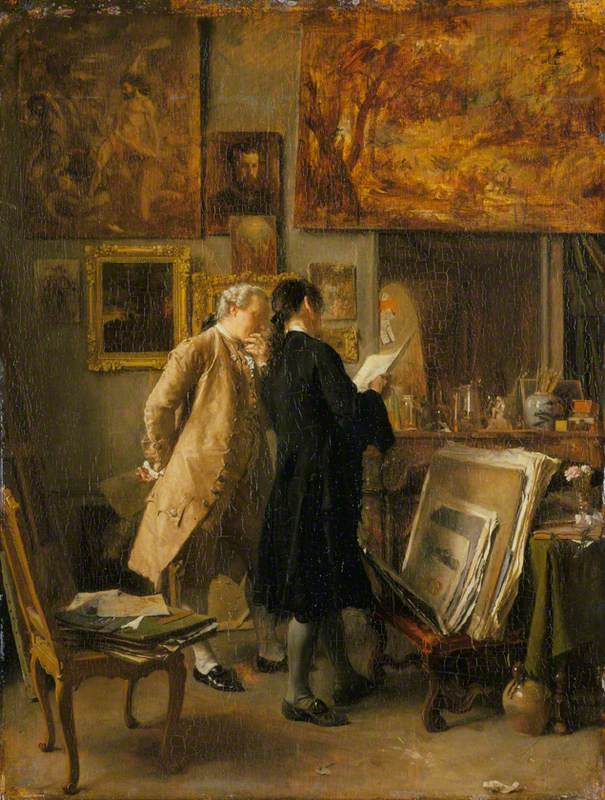
An Artist Showing His Work by Ernest Meissonier

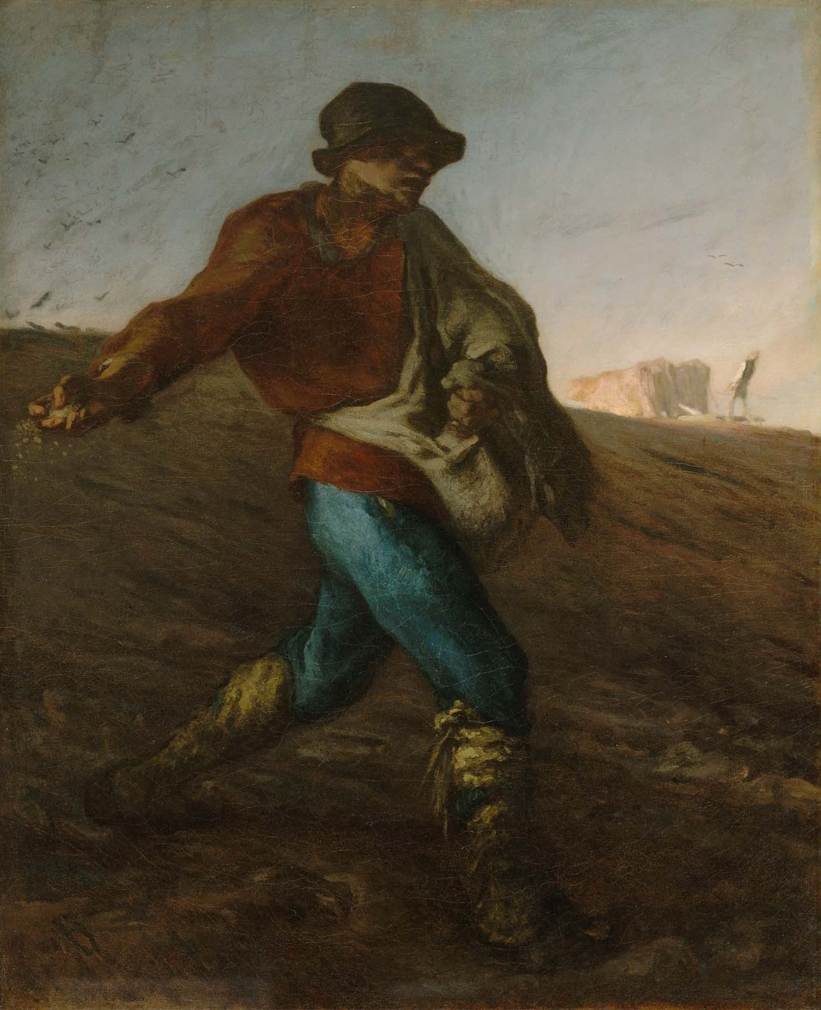
The Sower by Jean-François Millet

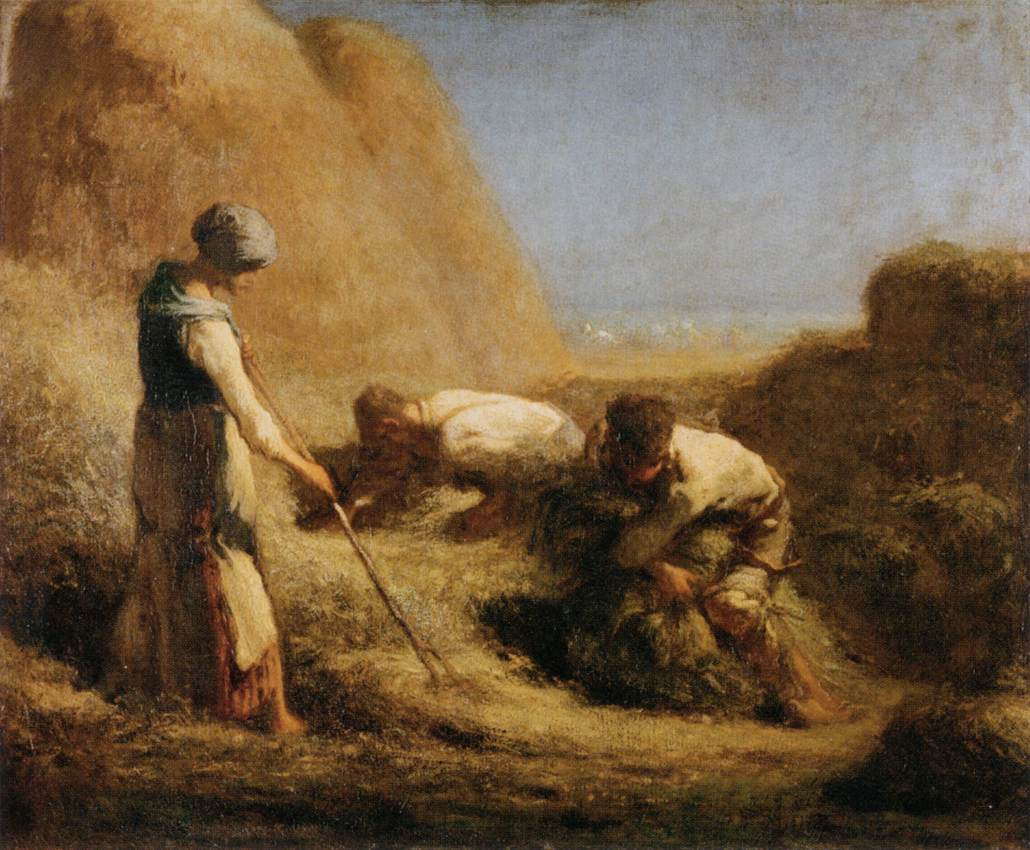
Trussing Hay by Jean-François Millet

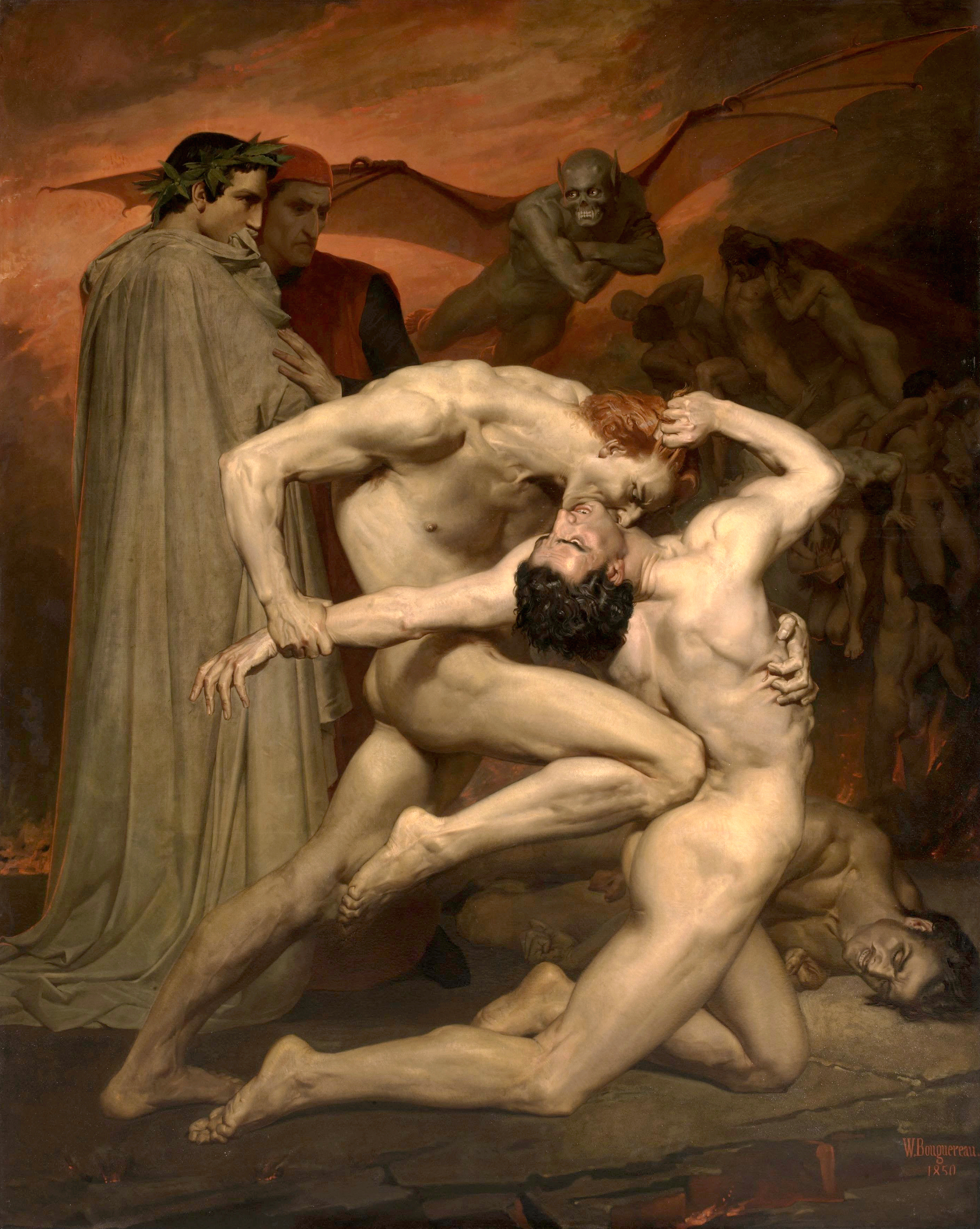
Dante and Virgil by William-Adolphe Bouguereau

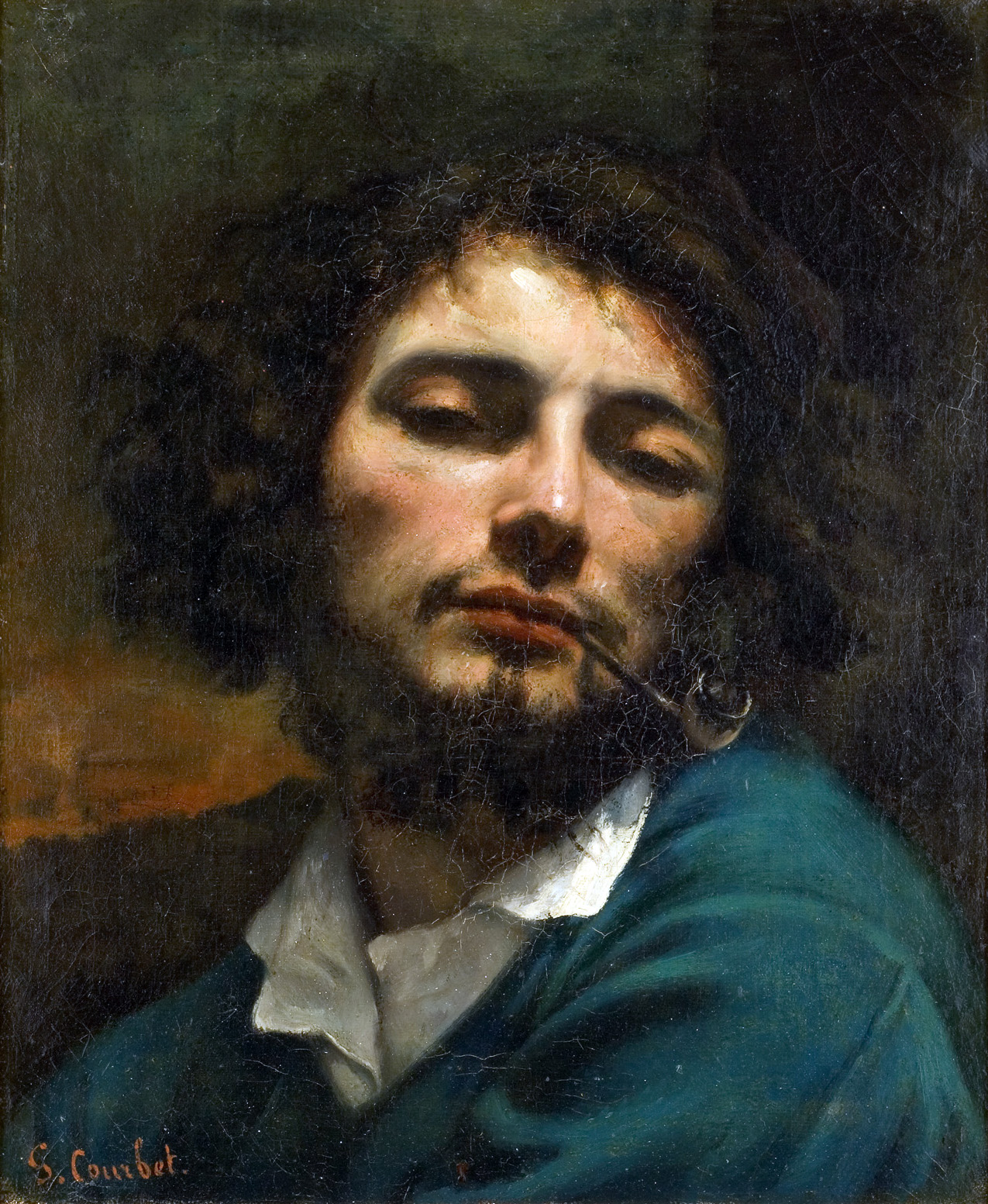
Self-Portrait with Pipe by Gustave Courbet

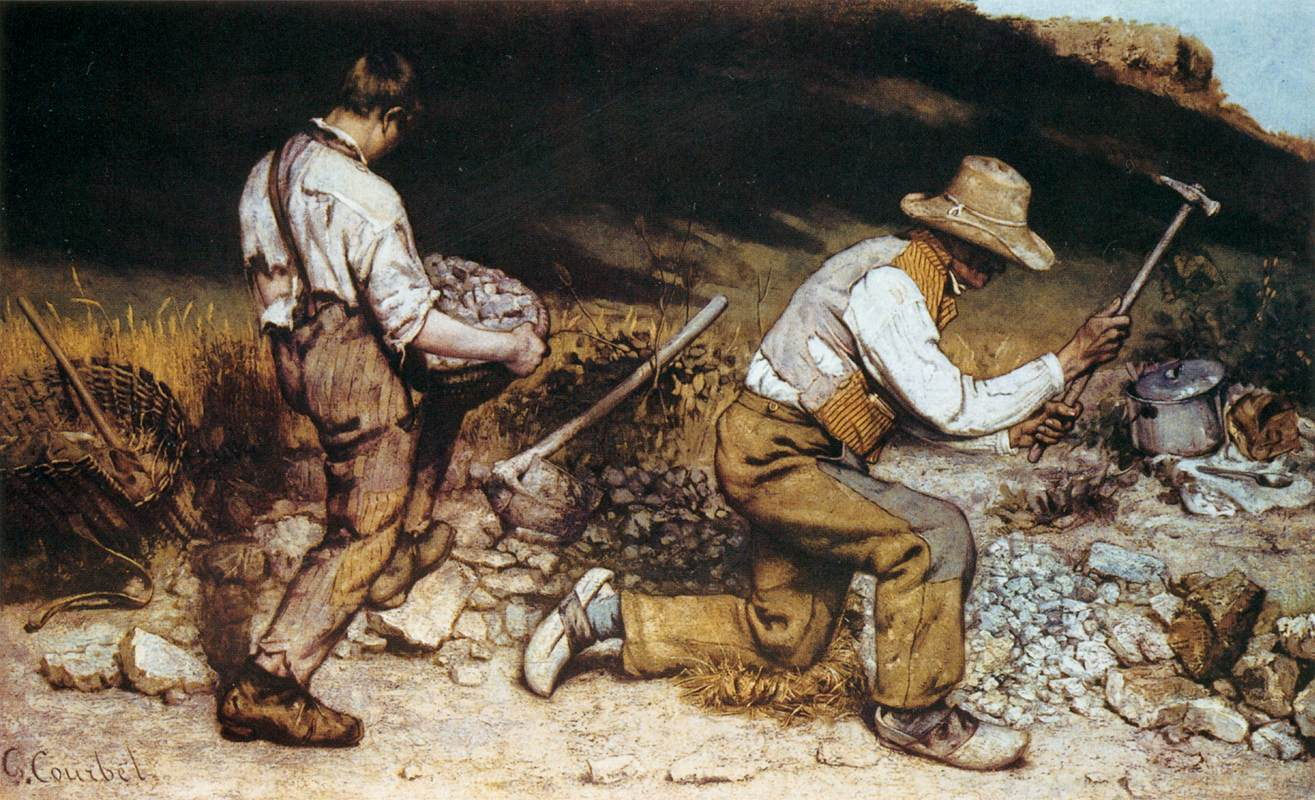
The Stone Breakers by Gustave Courbet

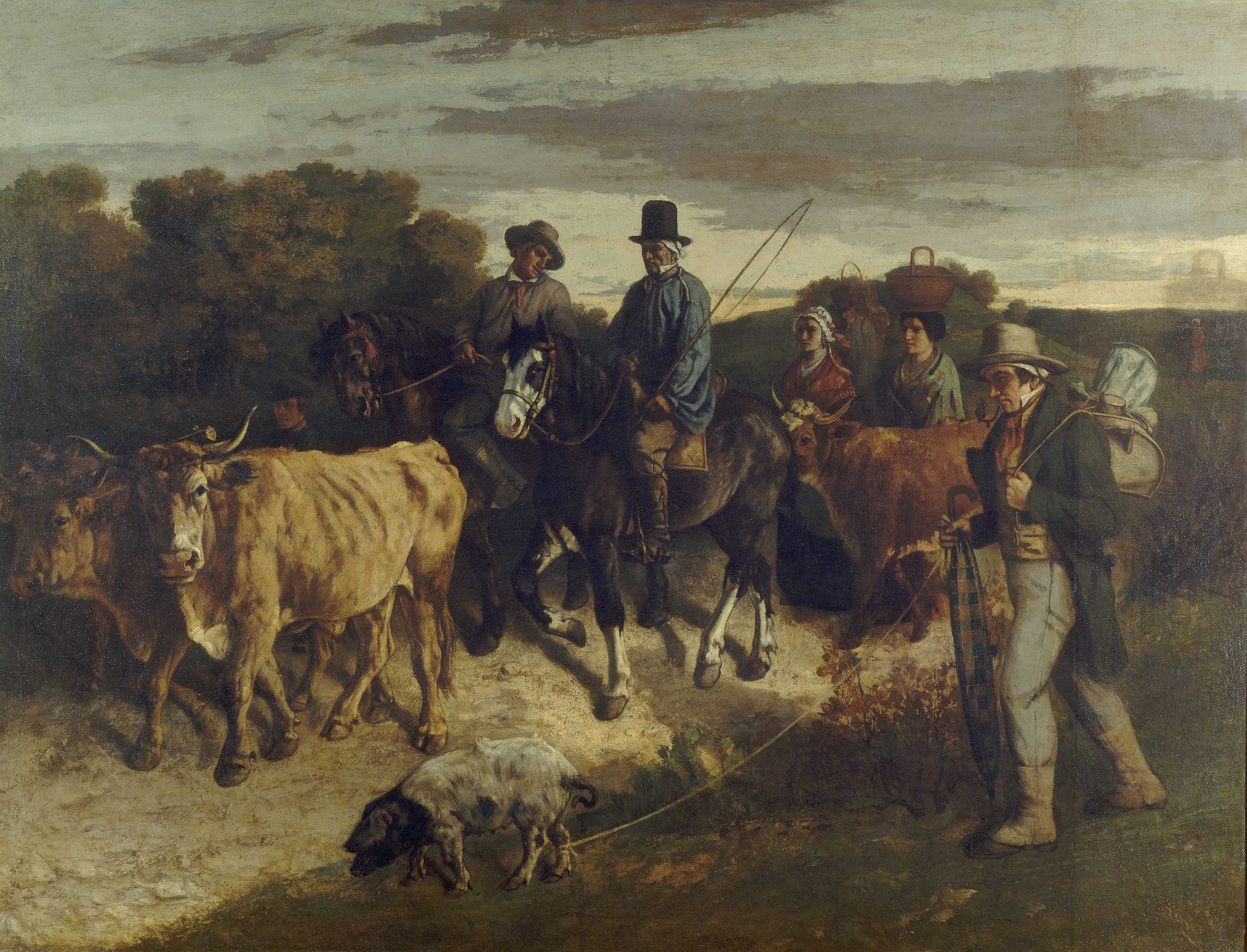
Les Paysans de Flagey revenant de la foire by Gustave Courbet

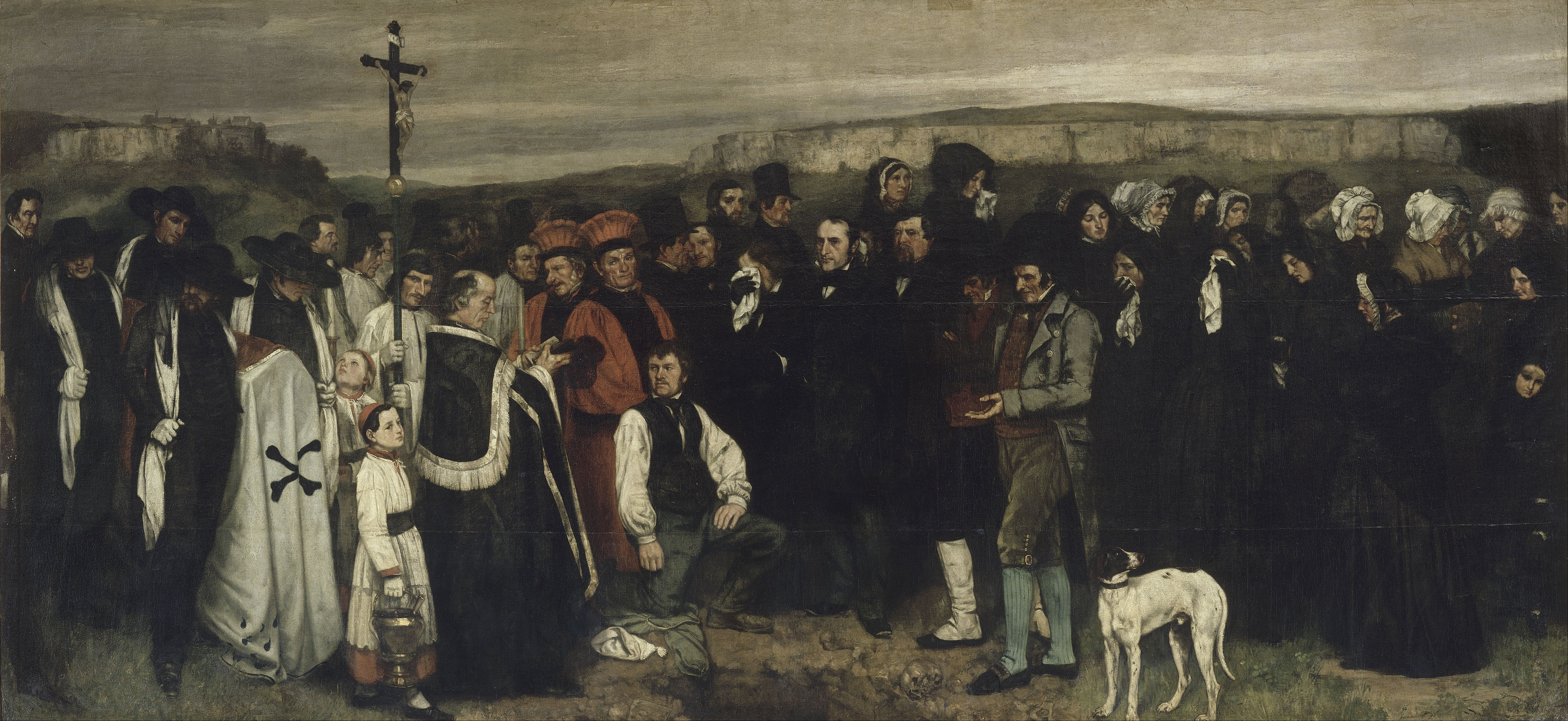
A Burial at Ornans by Gustave Courbet

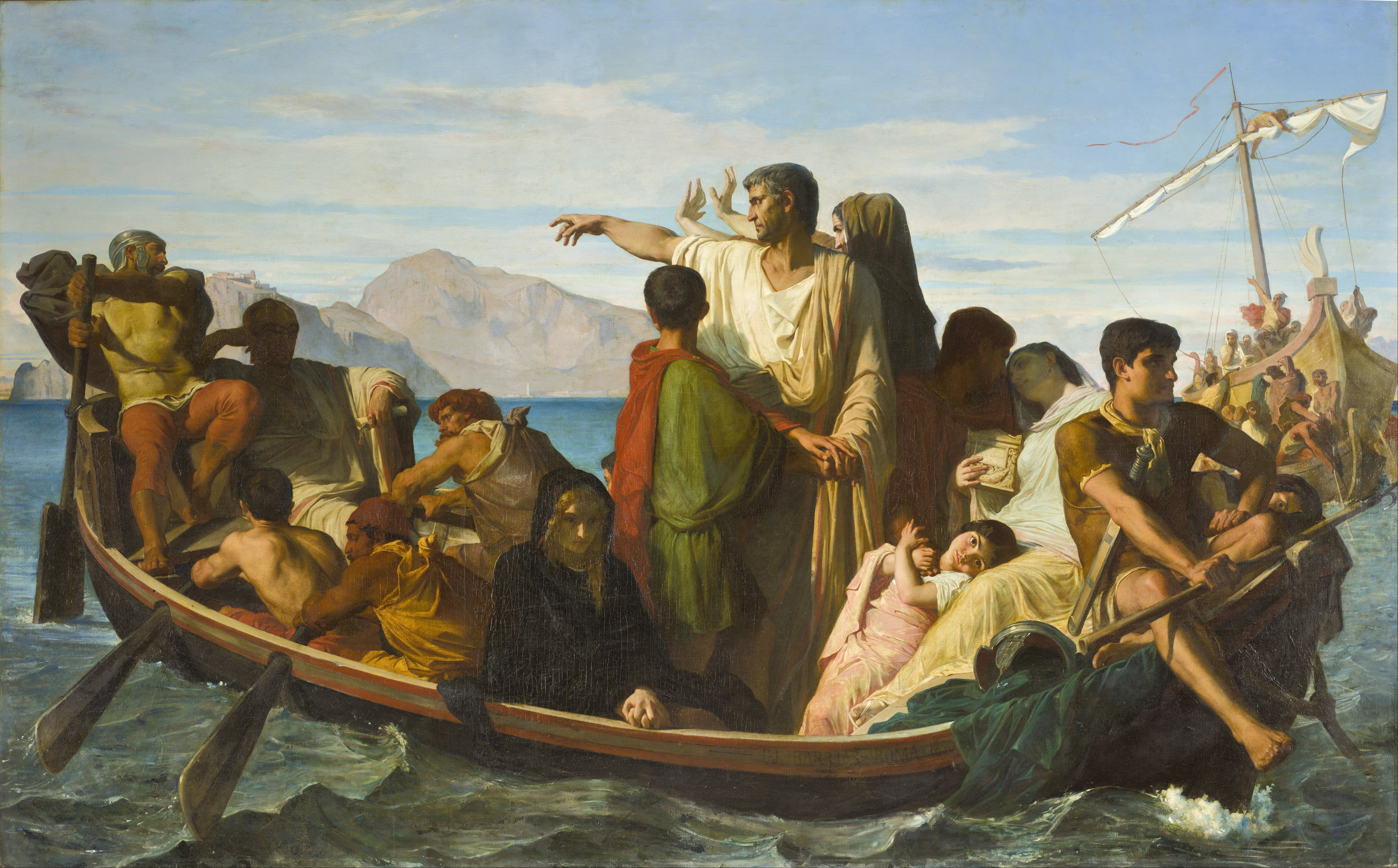
The Exiles of Tiberius by Félix-Joseph Barrias

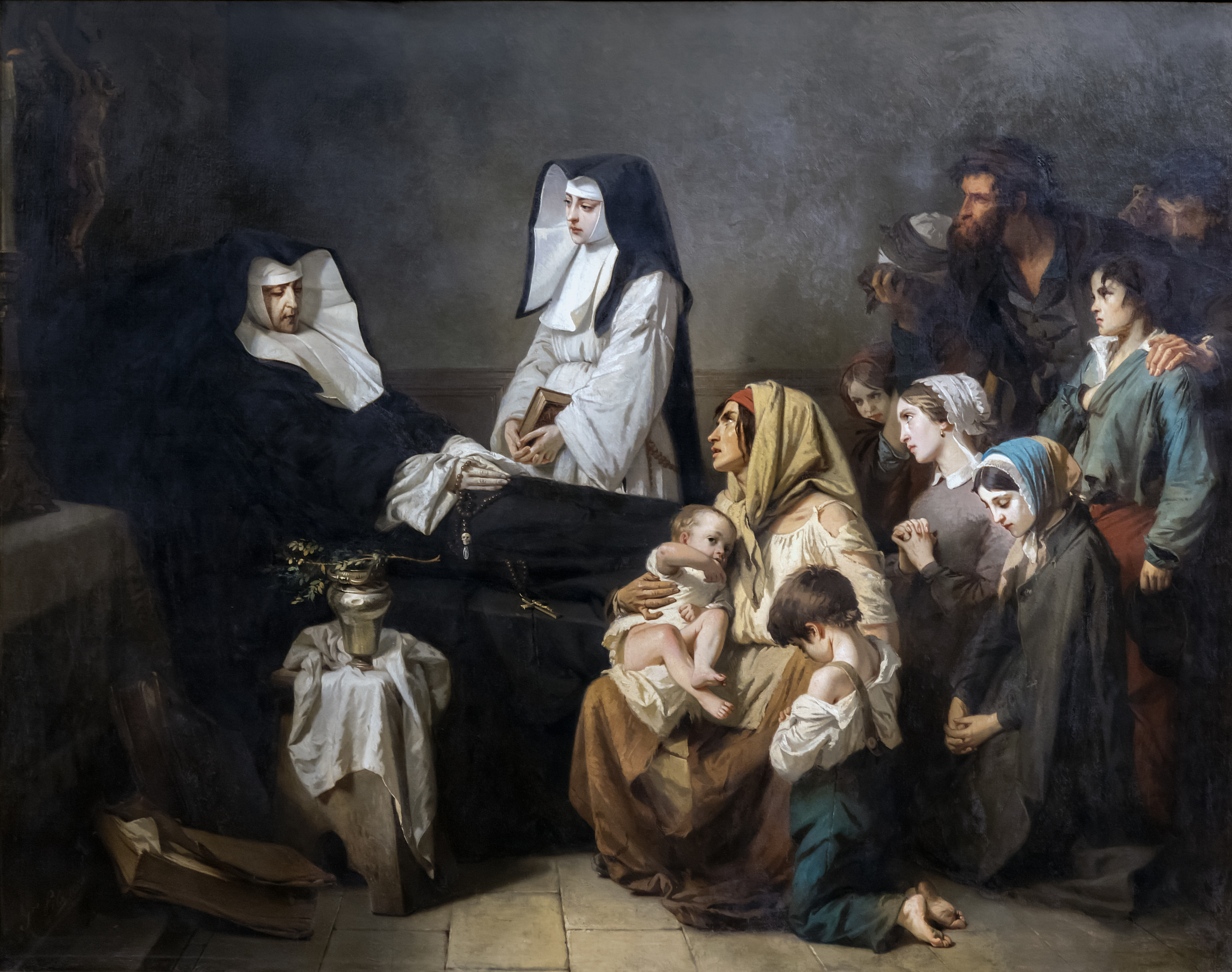
The Death of a Sister of Charity by Isidore Pils

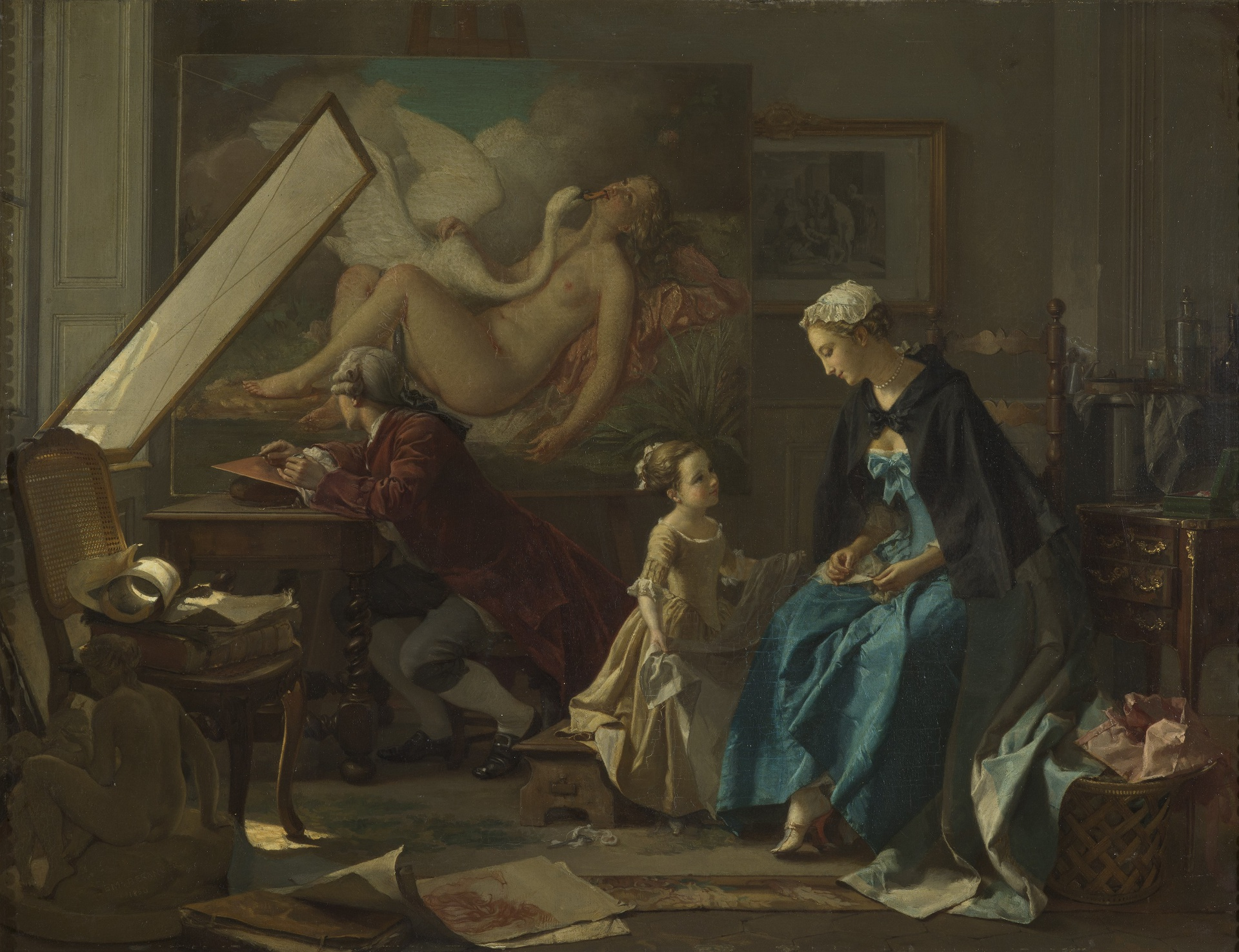
The Studio of the Engraver by Jean-Baptiste Antoine Emile Béranger

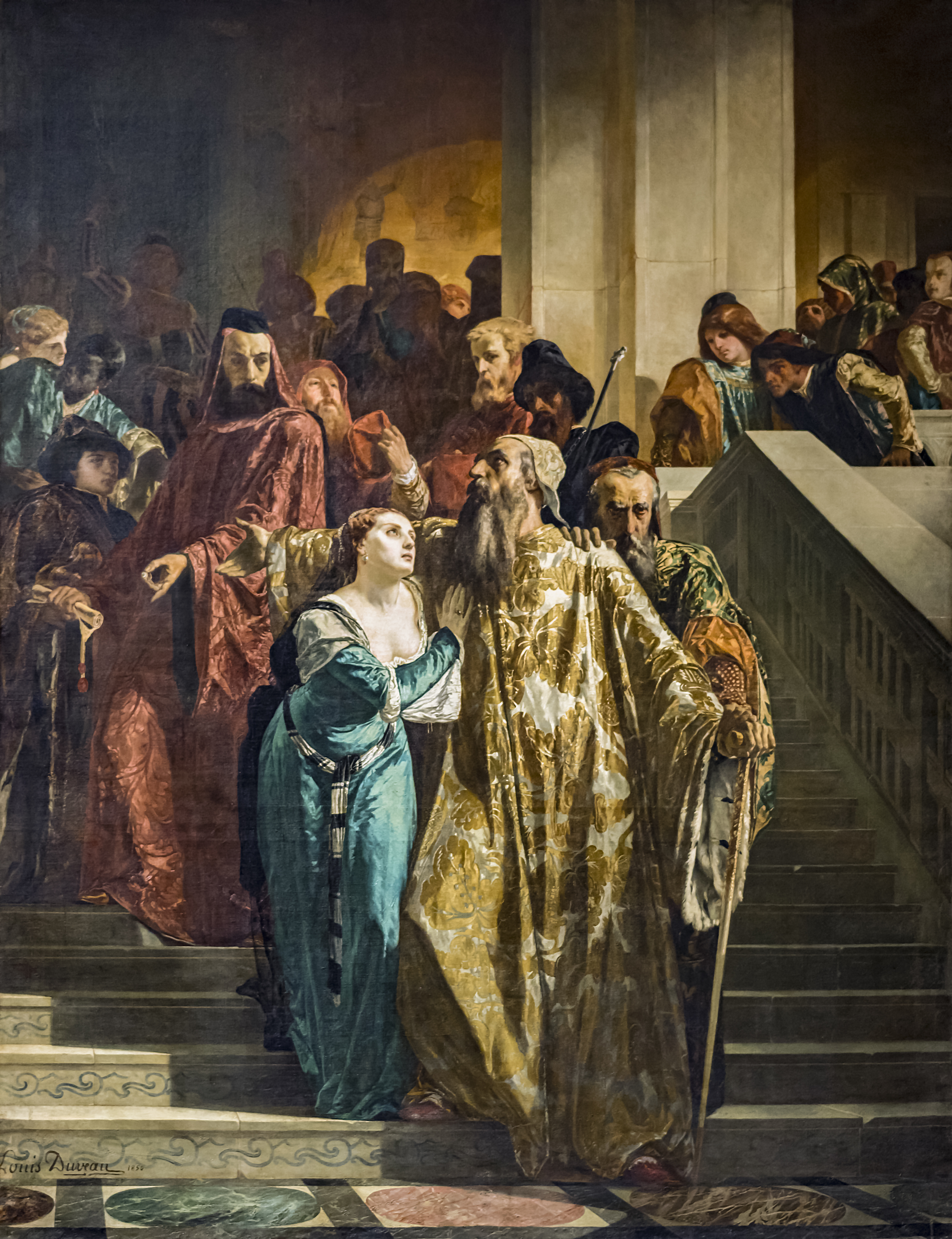
The Abdication of Doge Foscari by Louis Duveau

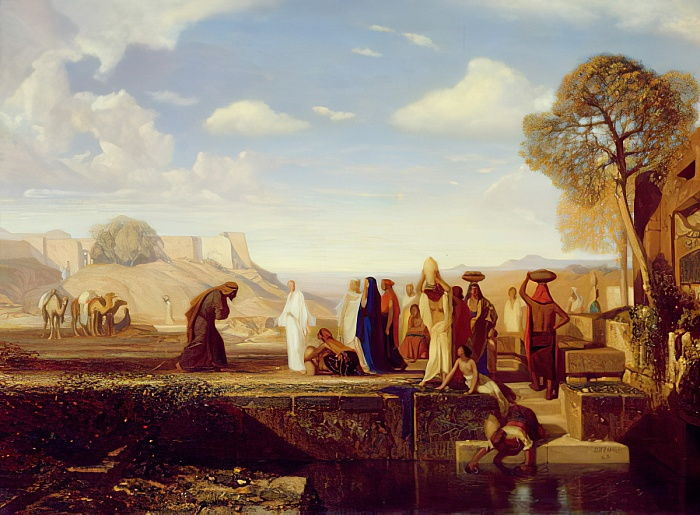
Rebecca at the Well by Alexandre-Gabriel Decamps

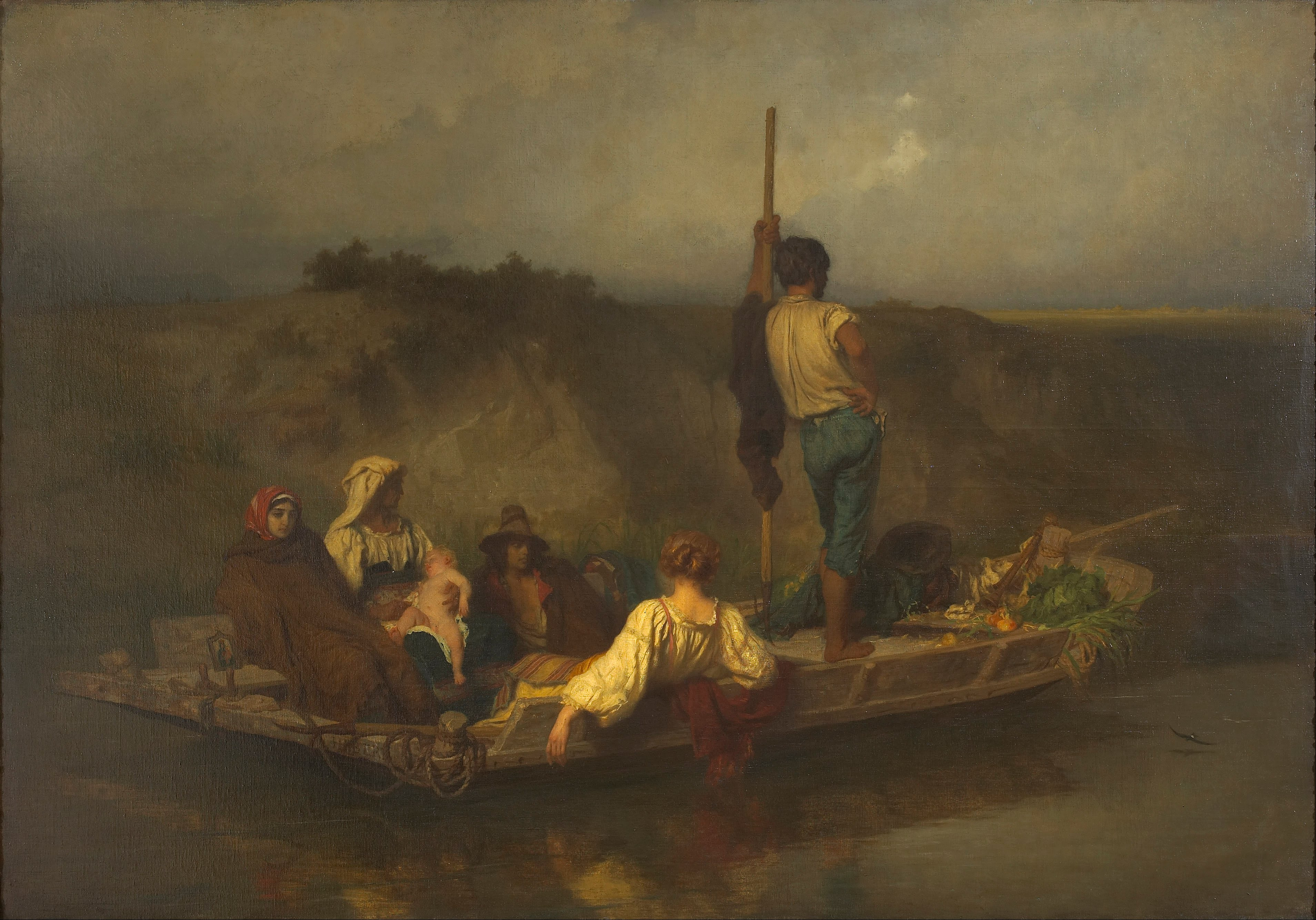
The Mal'aria by Ernest Hébert

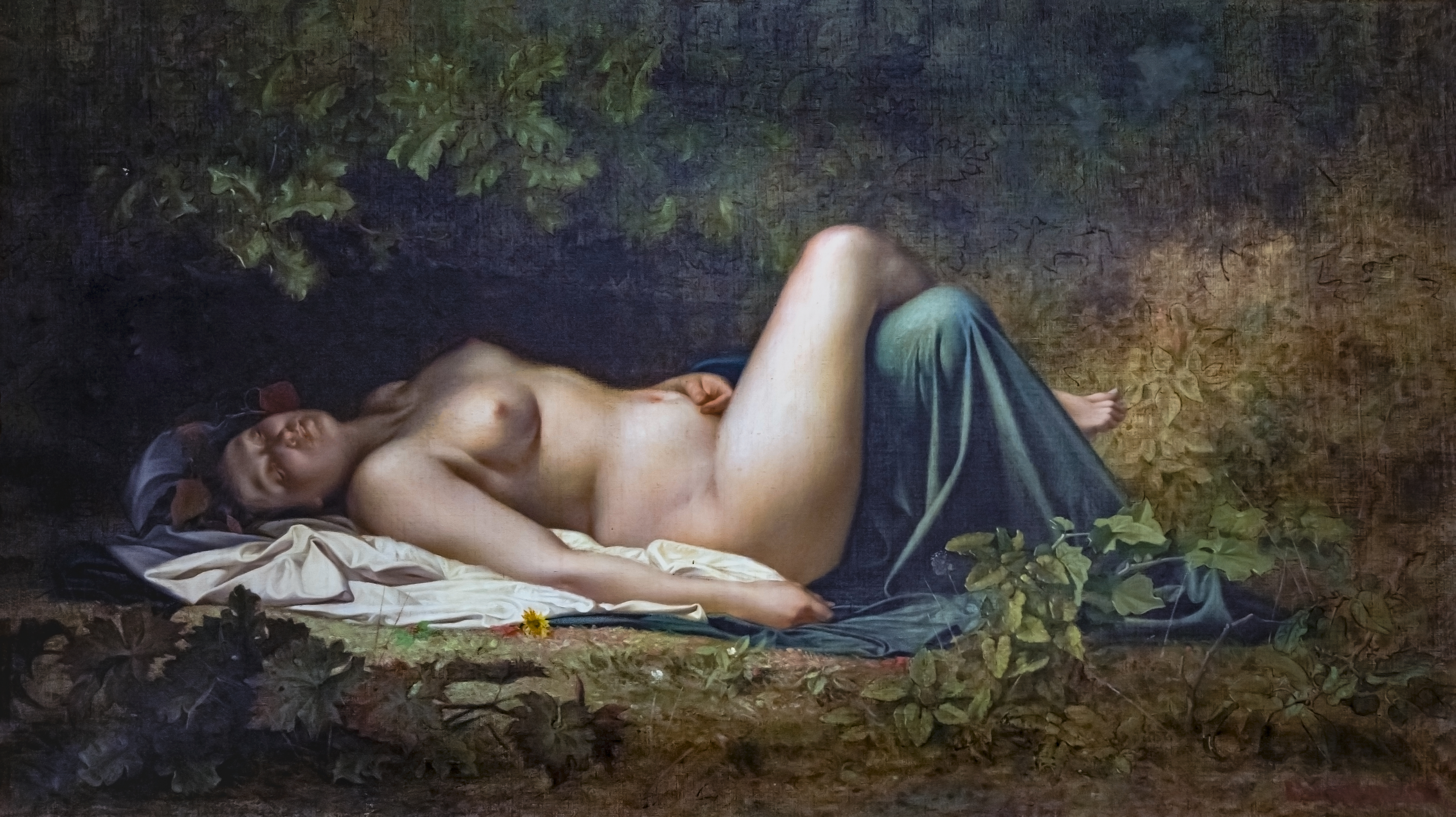
Sleeping Nymph by Armand Cambon

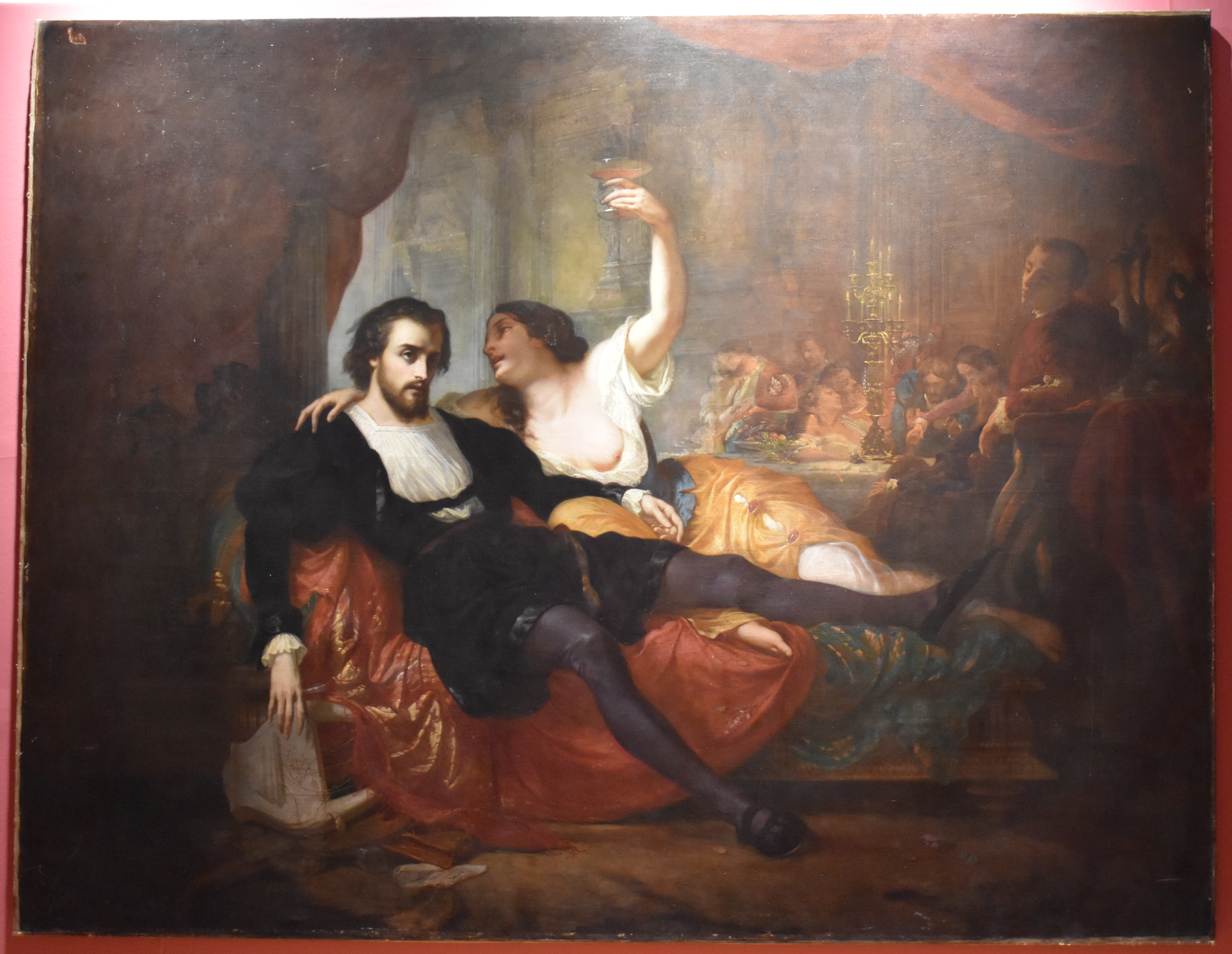
Le génie éteint par la volupté by Hippolyte Lazerges

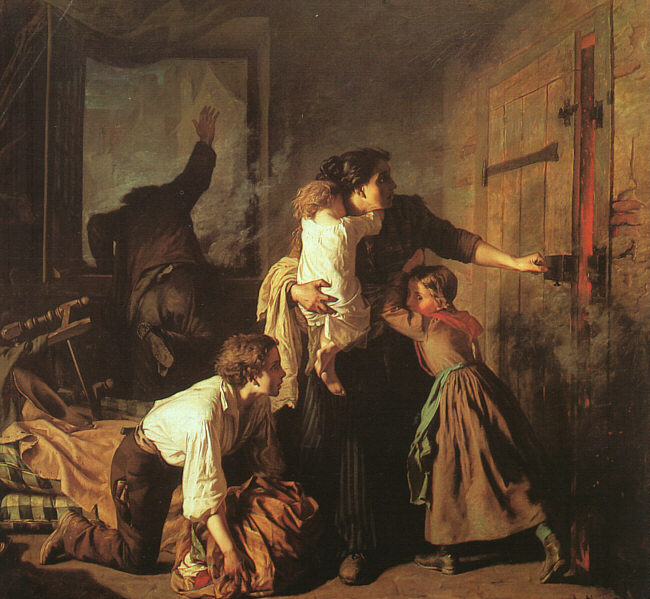
L'Incendie by Alexandre Antigna

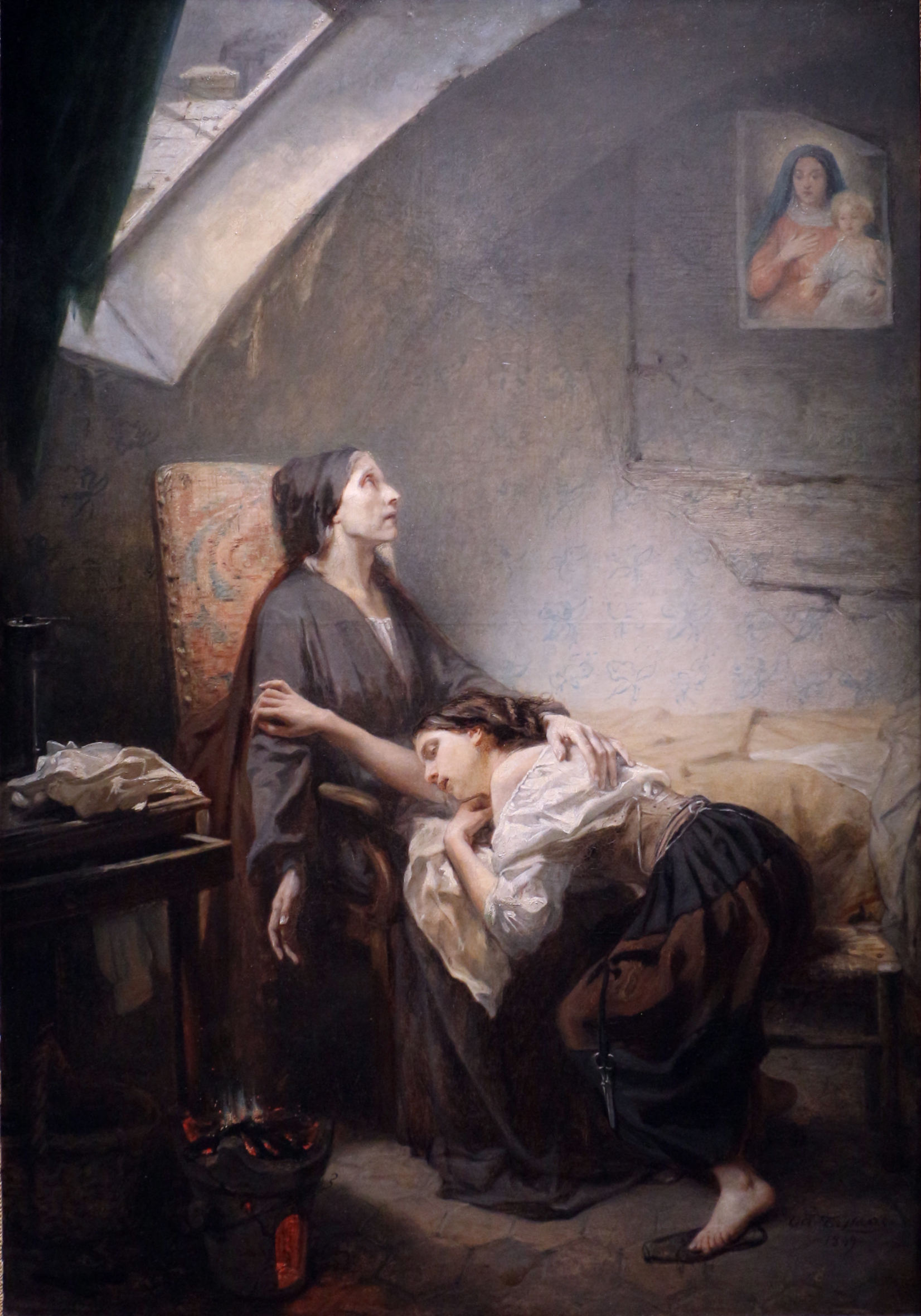
An Unhappy Family by Octave Tassaert

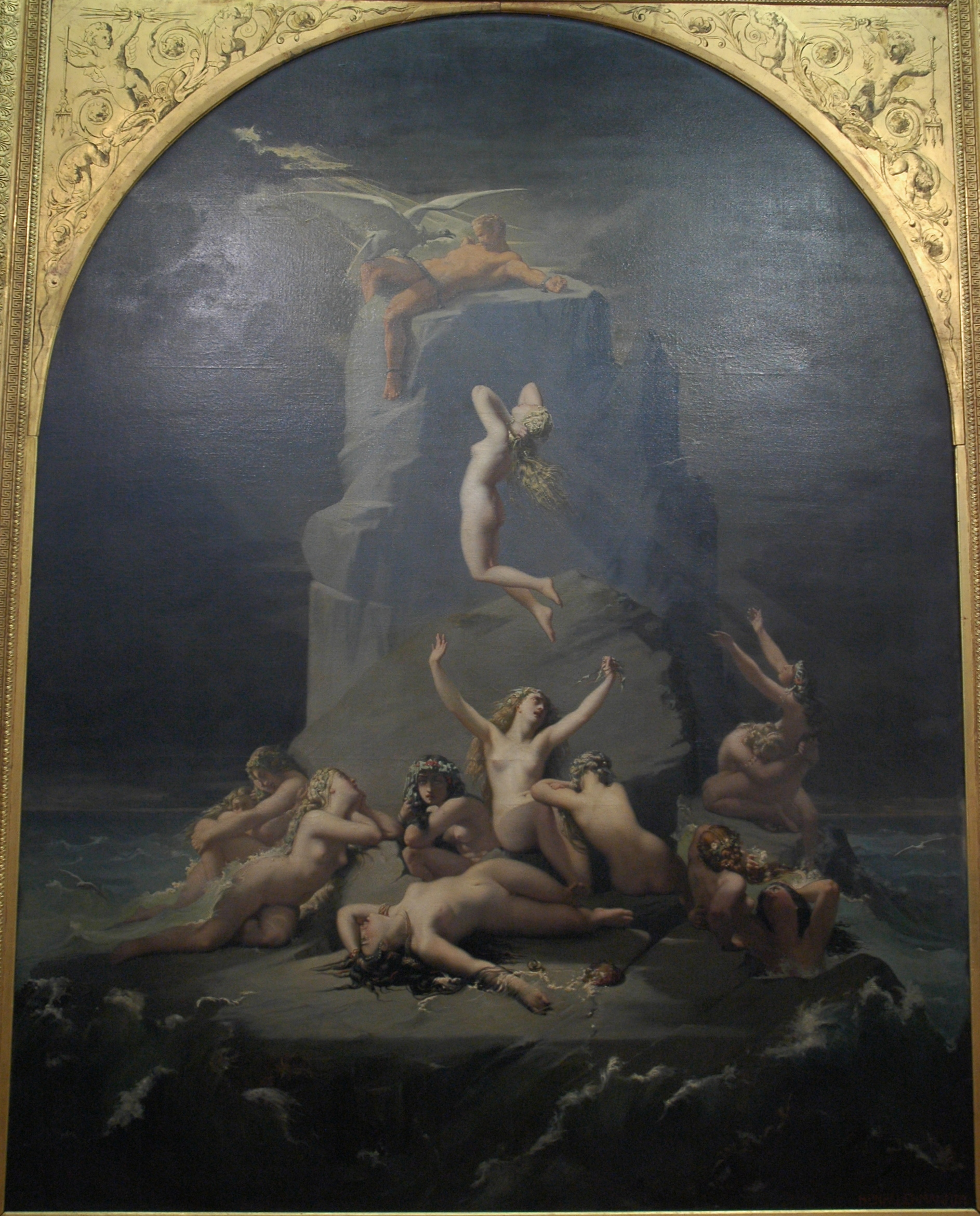
Desolation of the Oceanids by Henri Lehmann

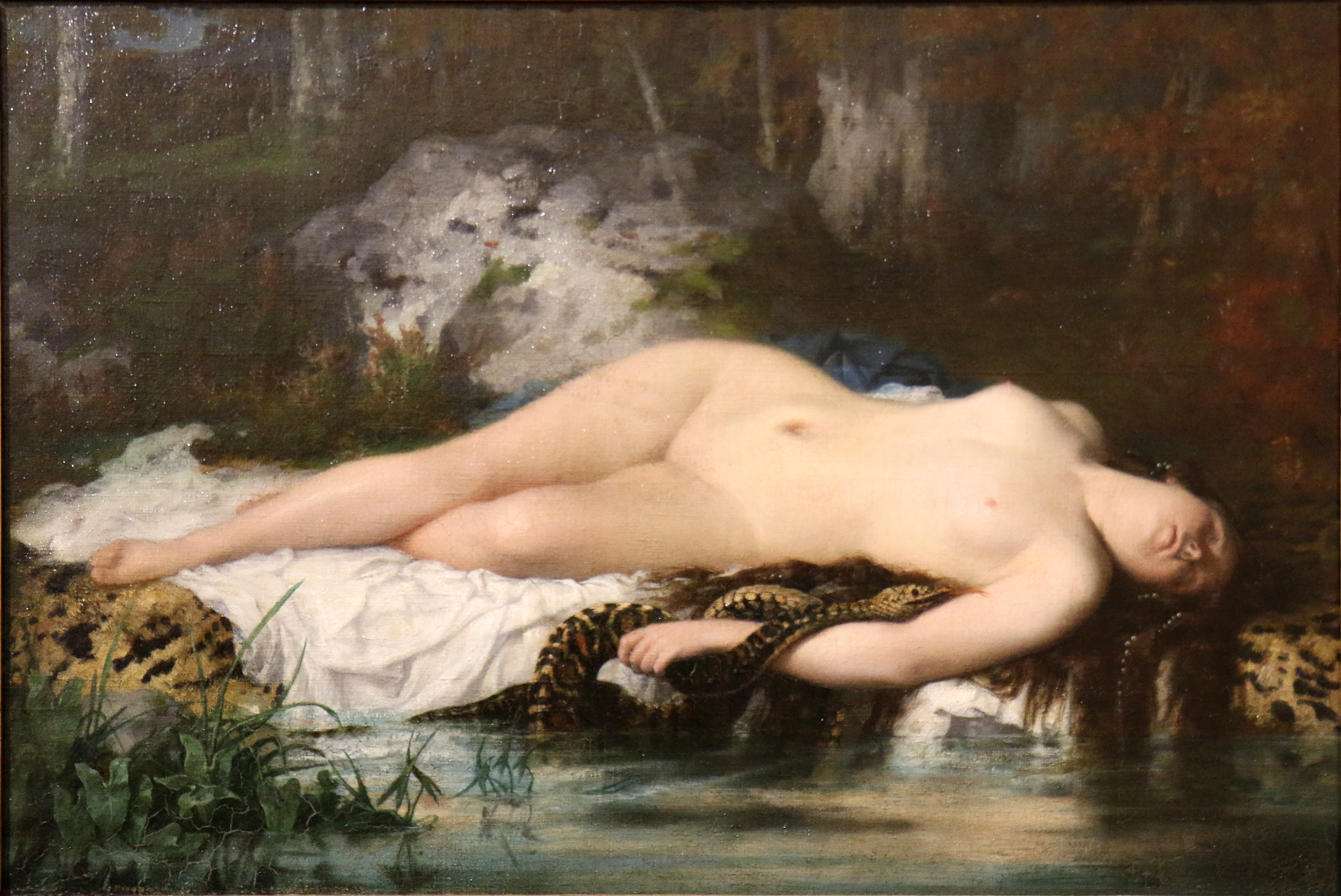
La mort de Coronis by Charles Nègre

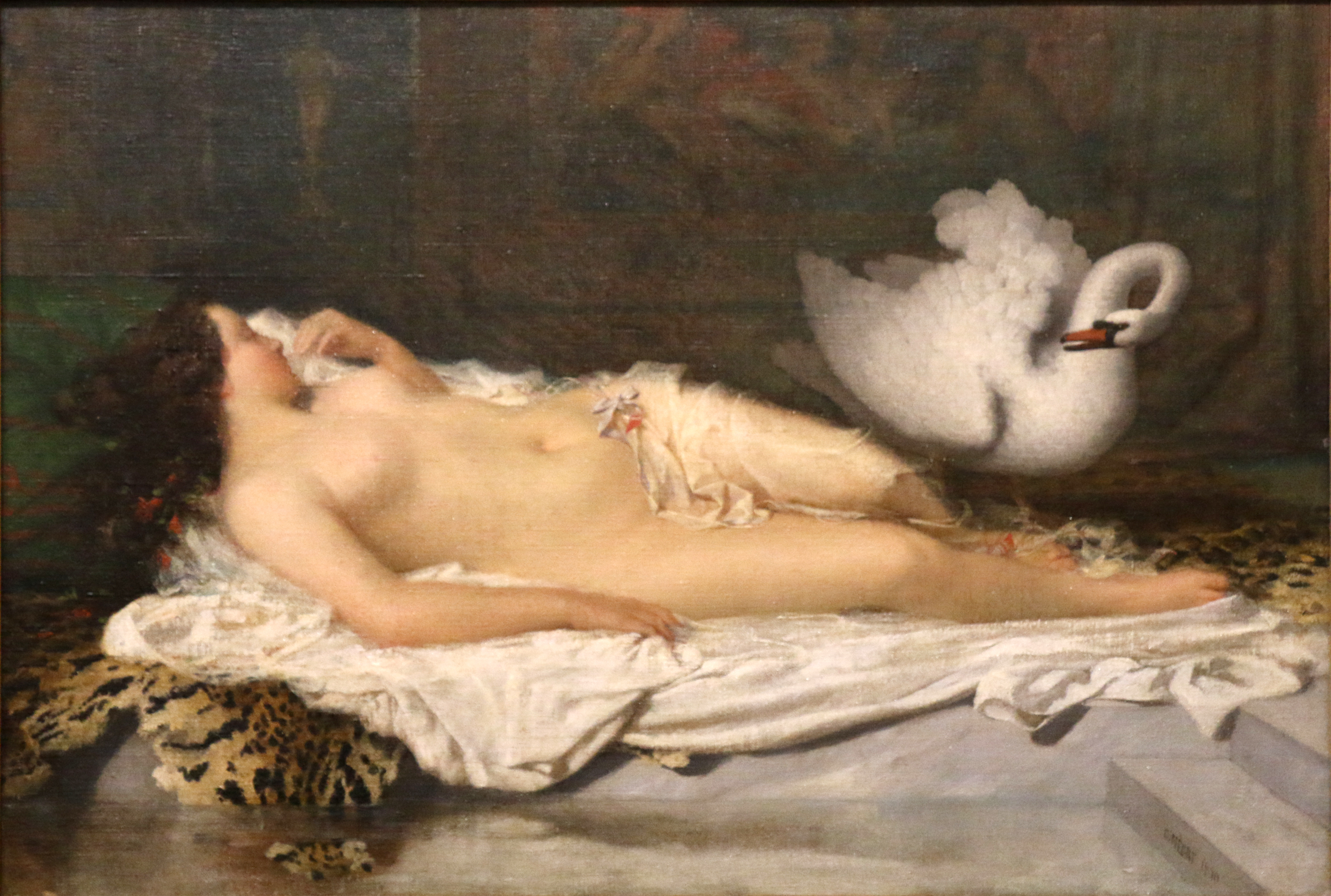
Leda and the Swan by Charles Nègre

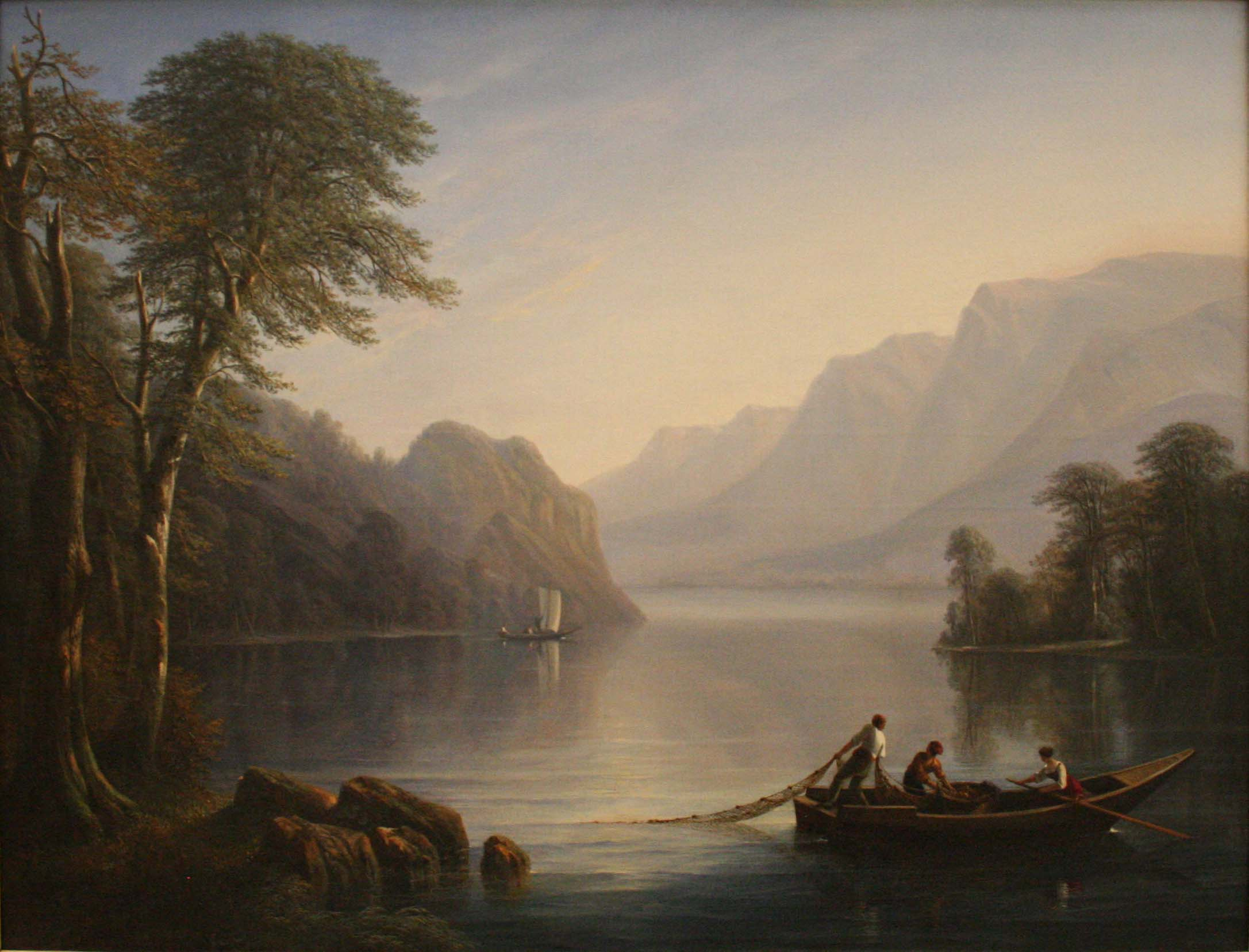
The Lake at Neufchâtel by Isidore Dagnan

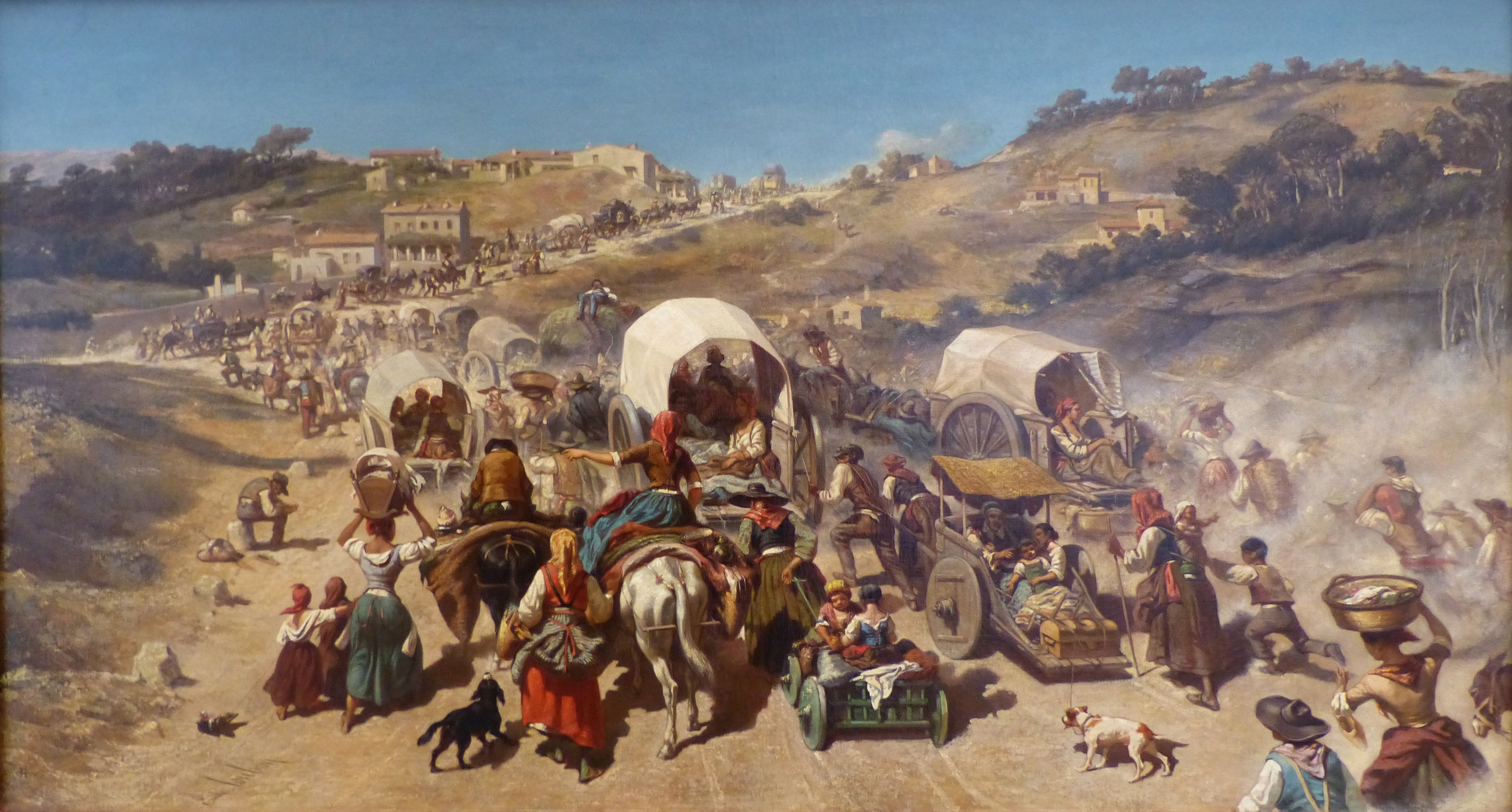
Emigration for Cholera in Marseille by Émile Loubon

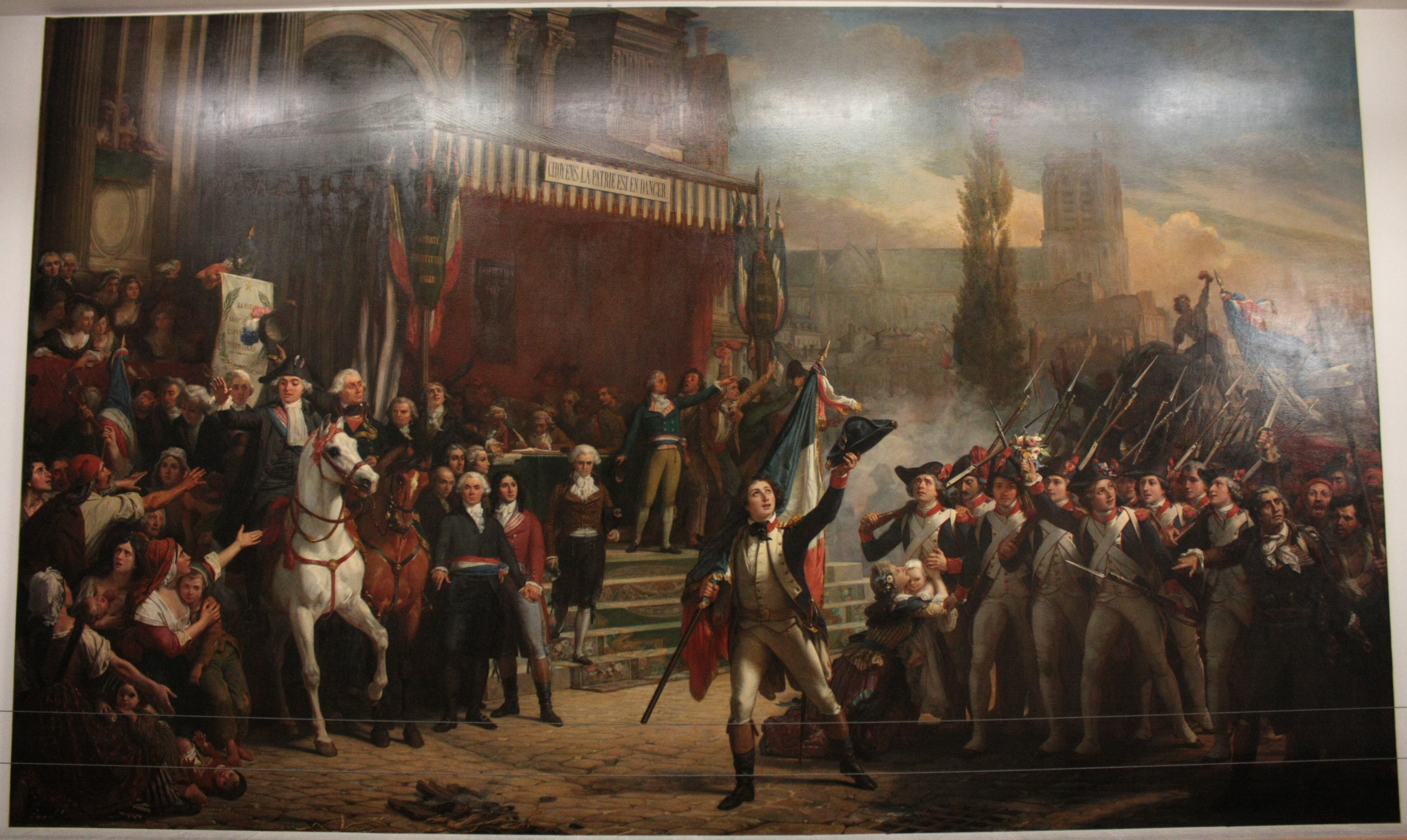
Enrôlement des Volontaires, 1792 by Auguste Vinchon

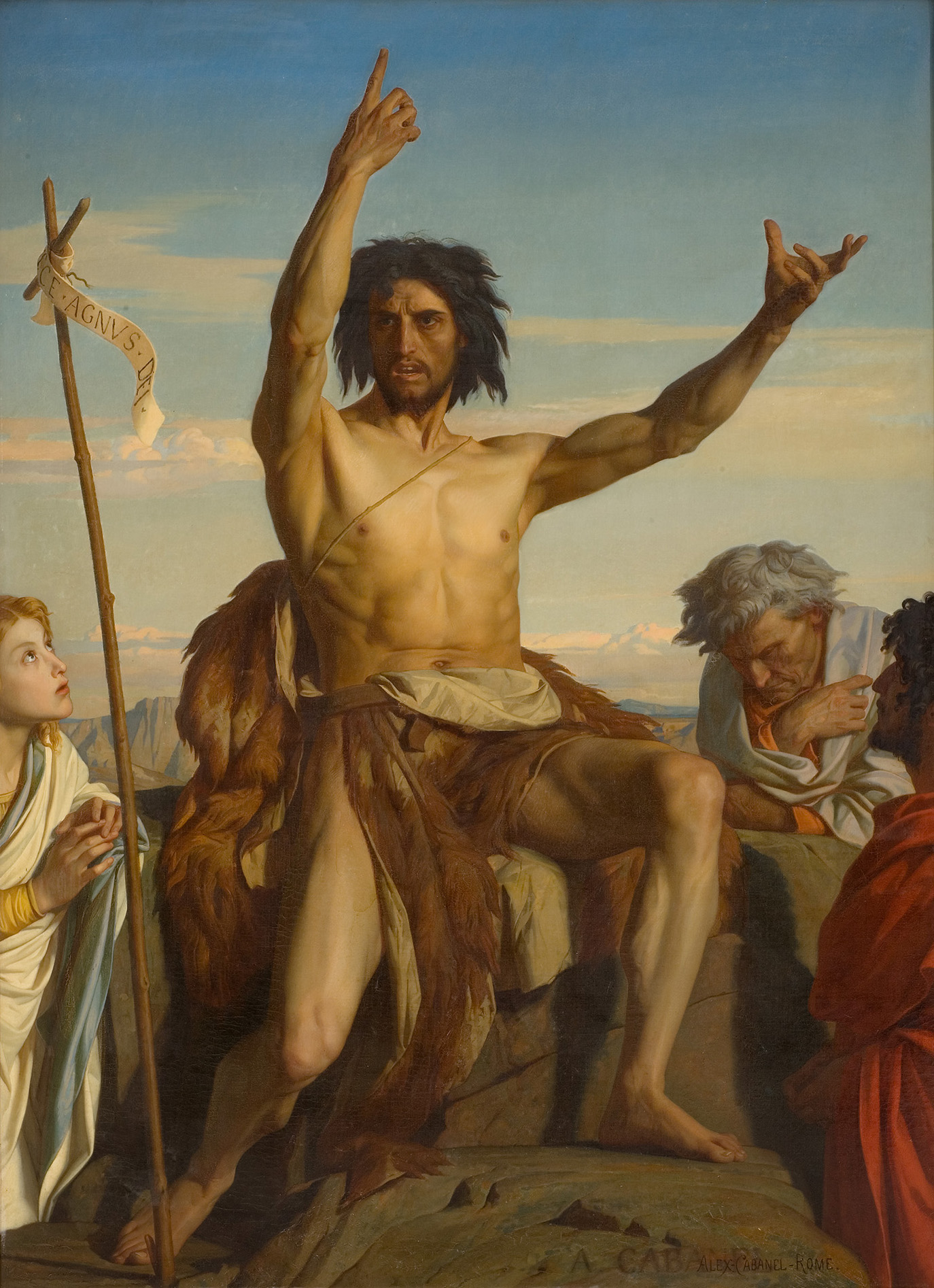
John the Baptist by Alexandre Cabanel

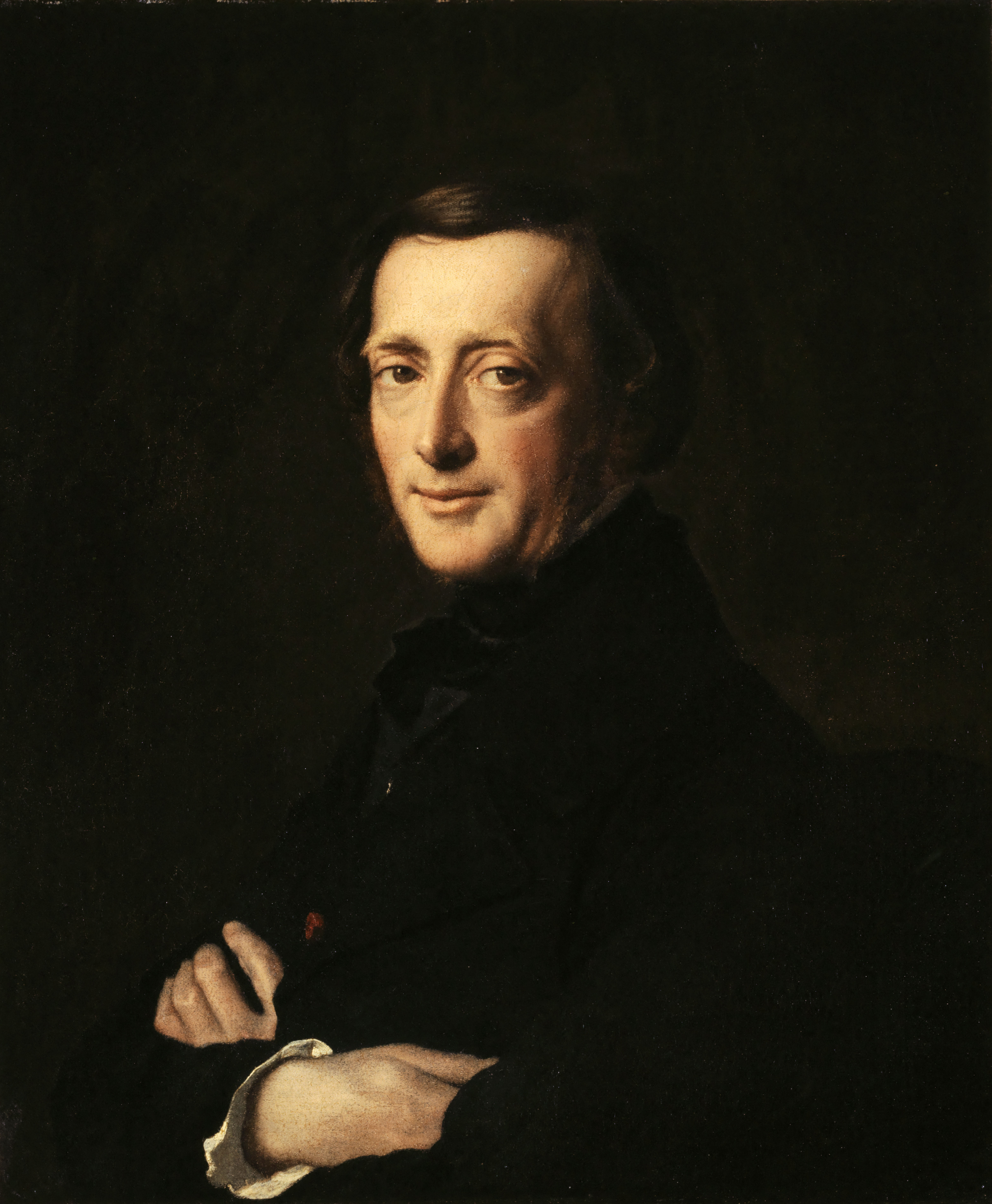
Portrait of Mayer-Goudchaux Worms by Henri Lehmann

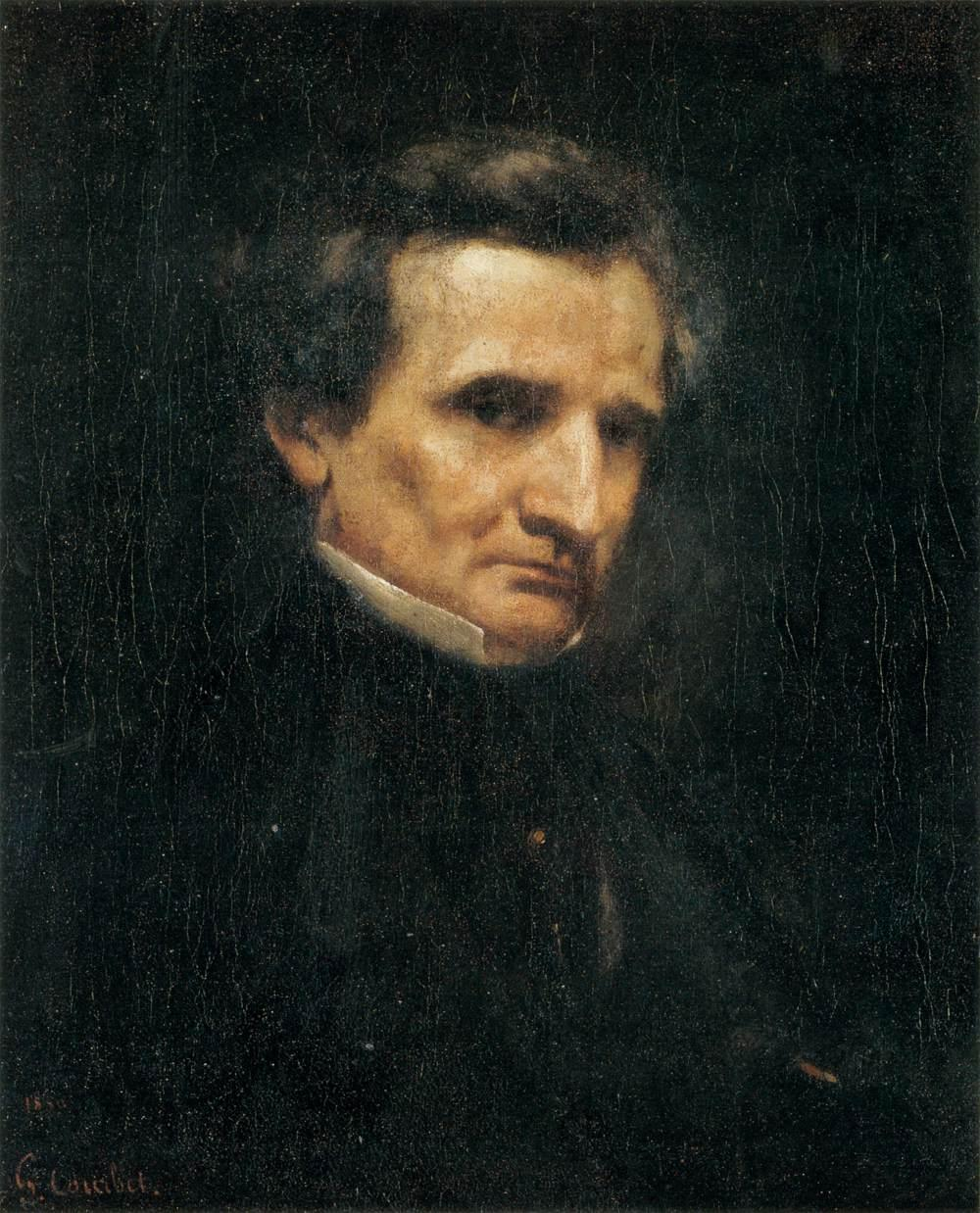
Portrait of Hector Berlioz by Gustave Courbet

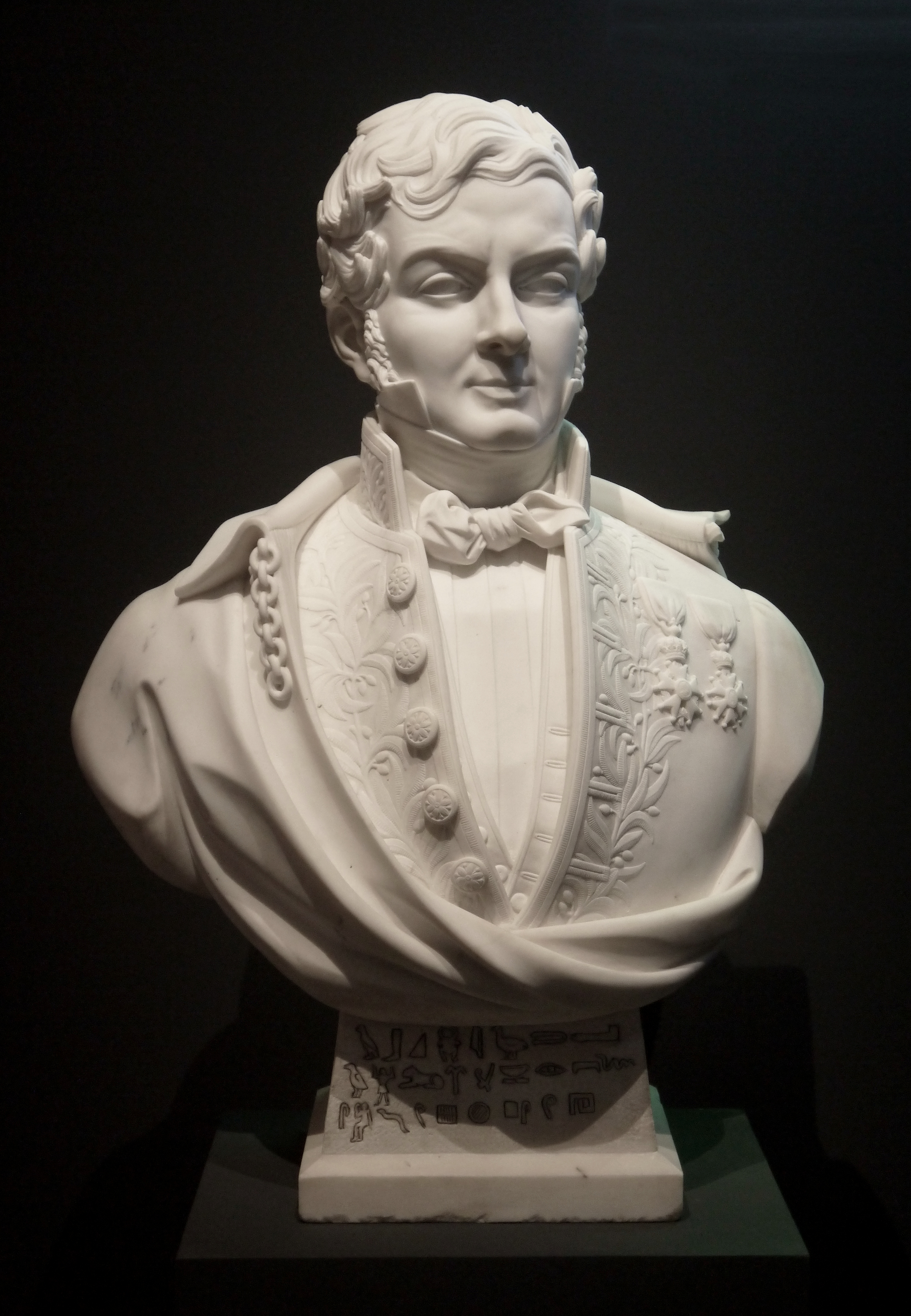
Bust of Jean-François Champollion by Émile Thomas

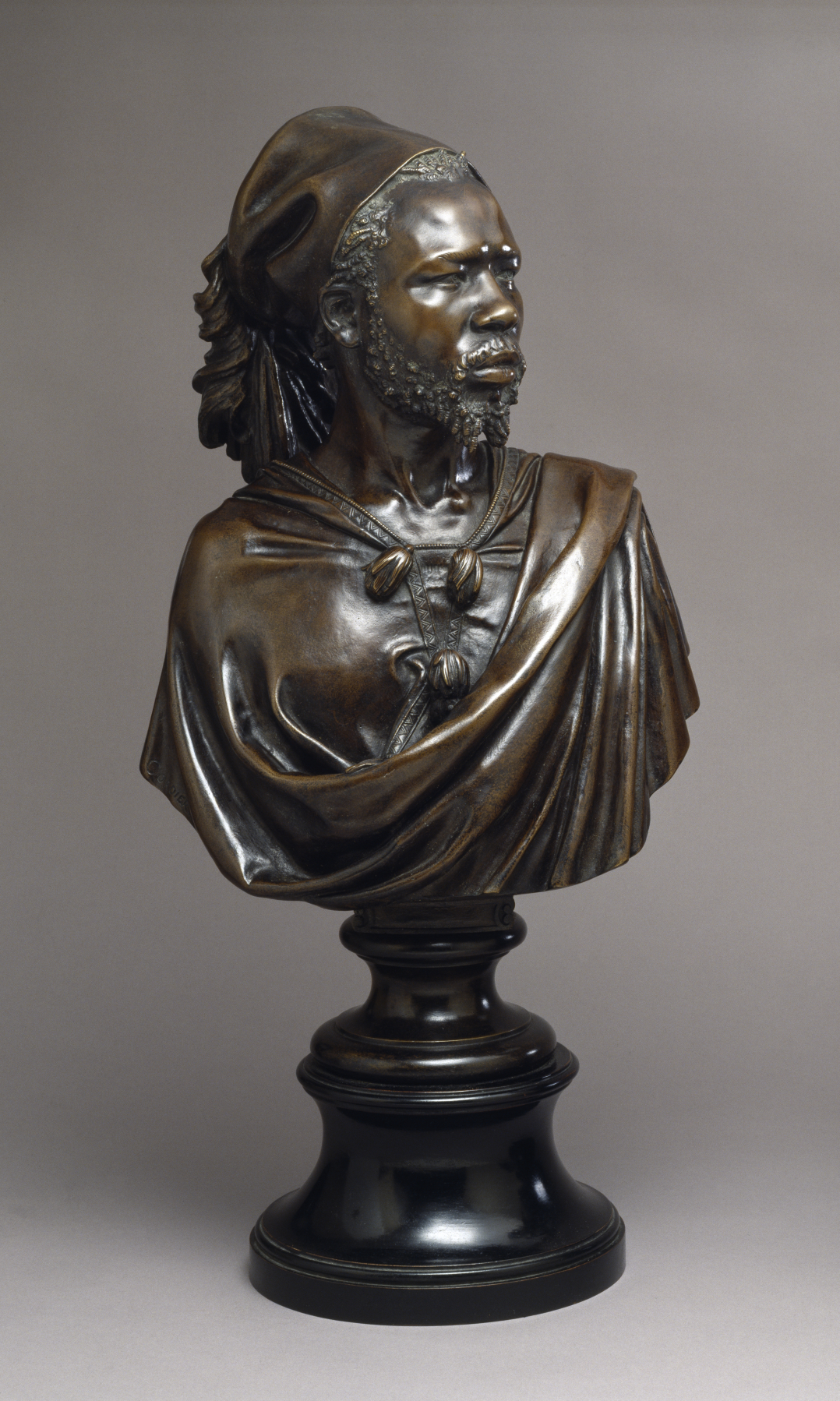
Saïd Abdullah of the Mayac by Charles Cordier

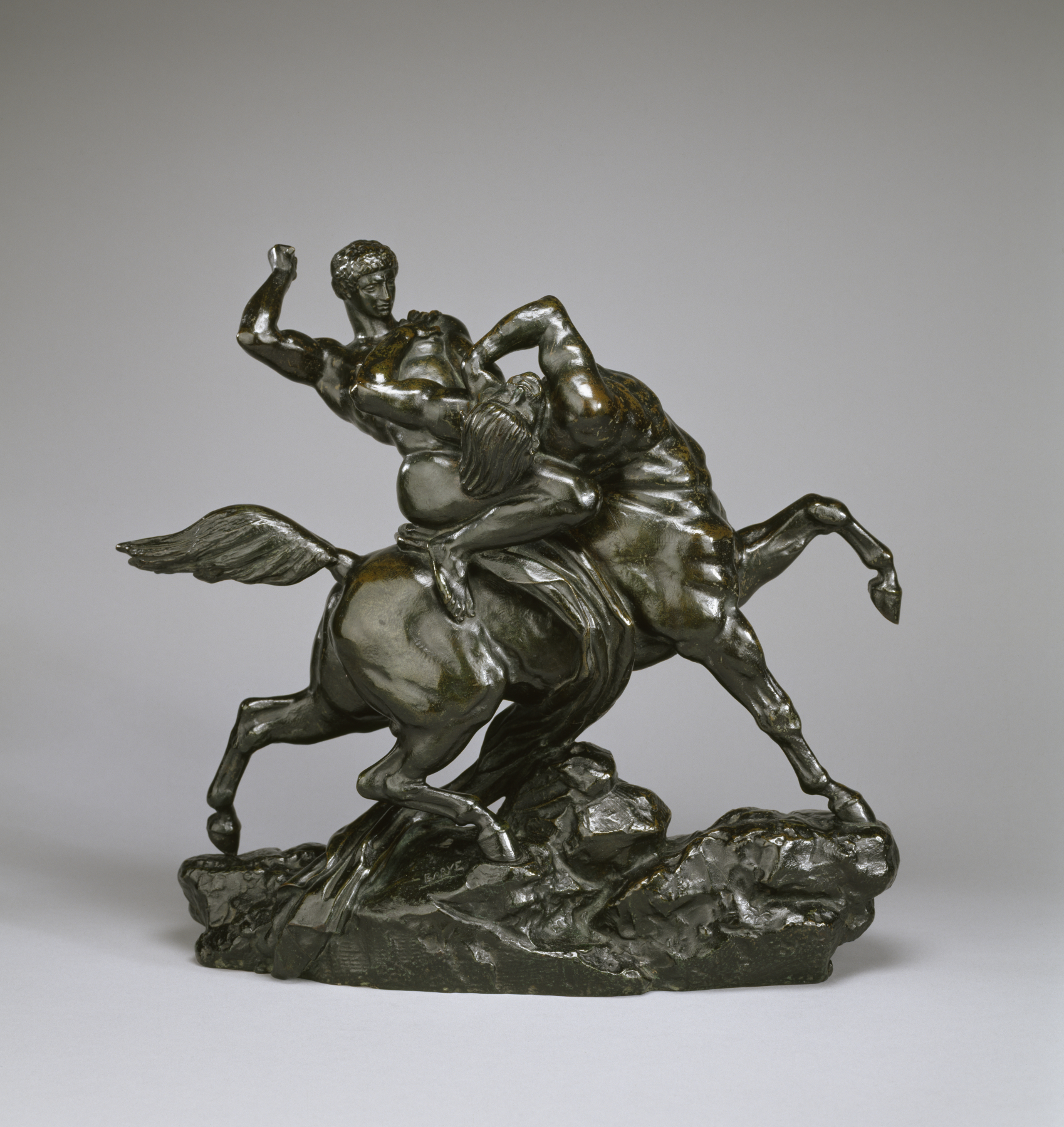
Lapith Combating a Centaur by Antoine-Louis Barye

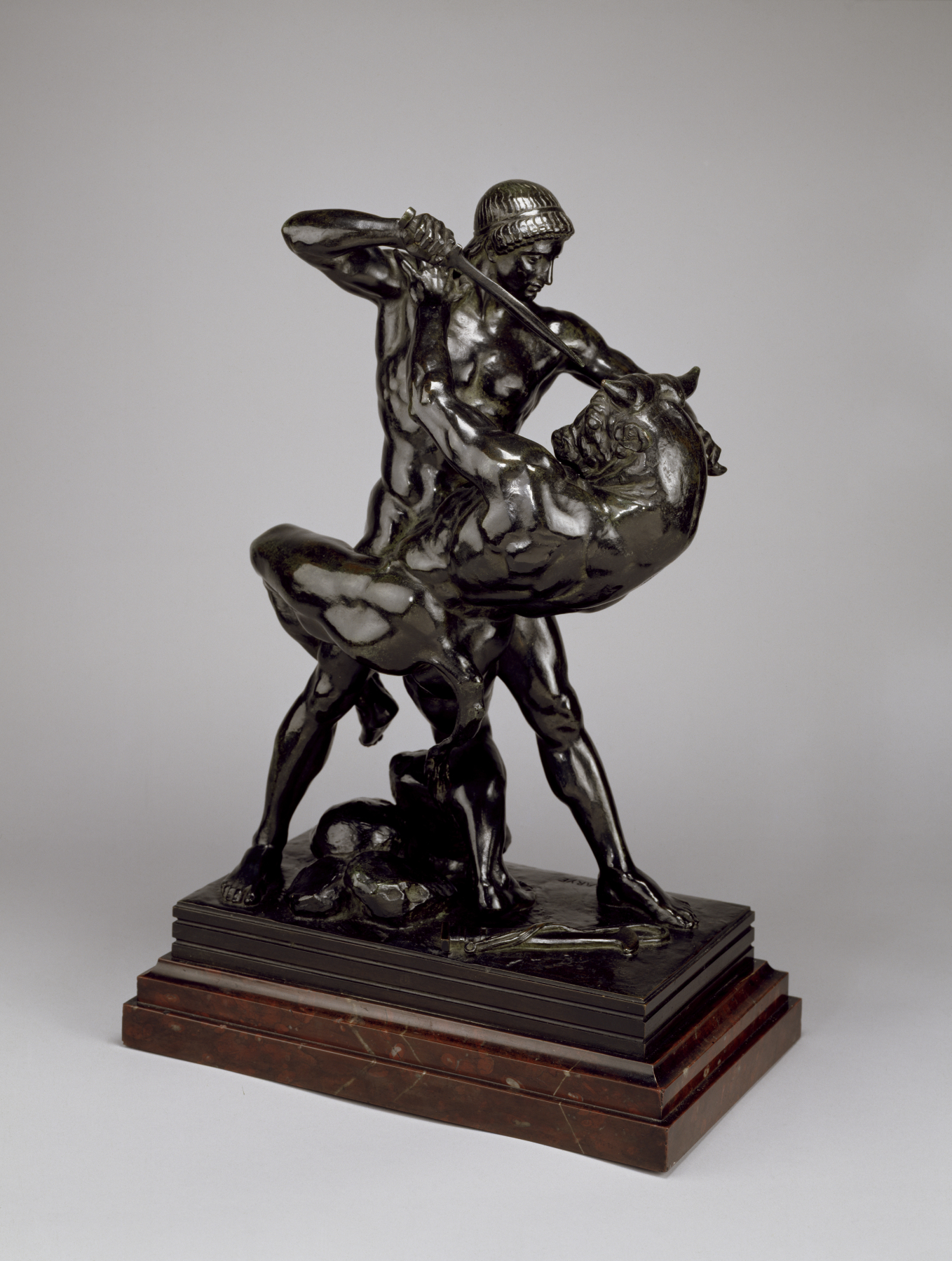
Theseus and the Minotaur by Antoine-Louis Barye

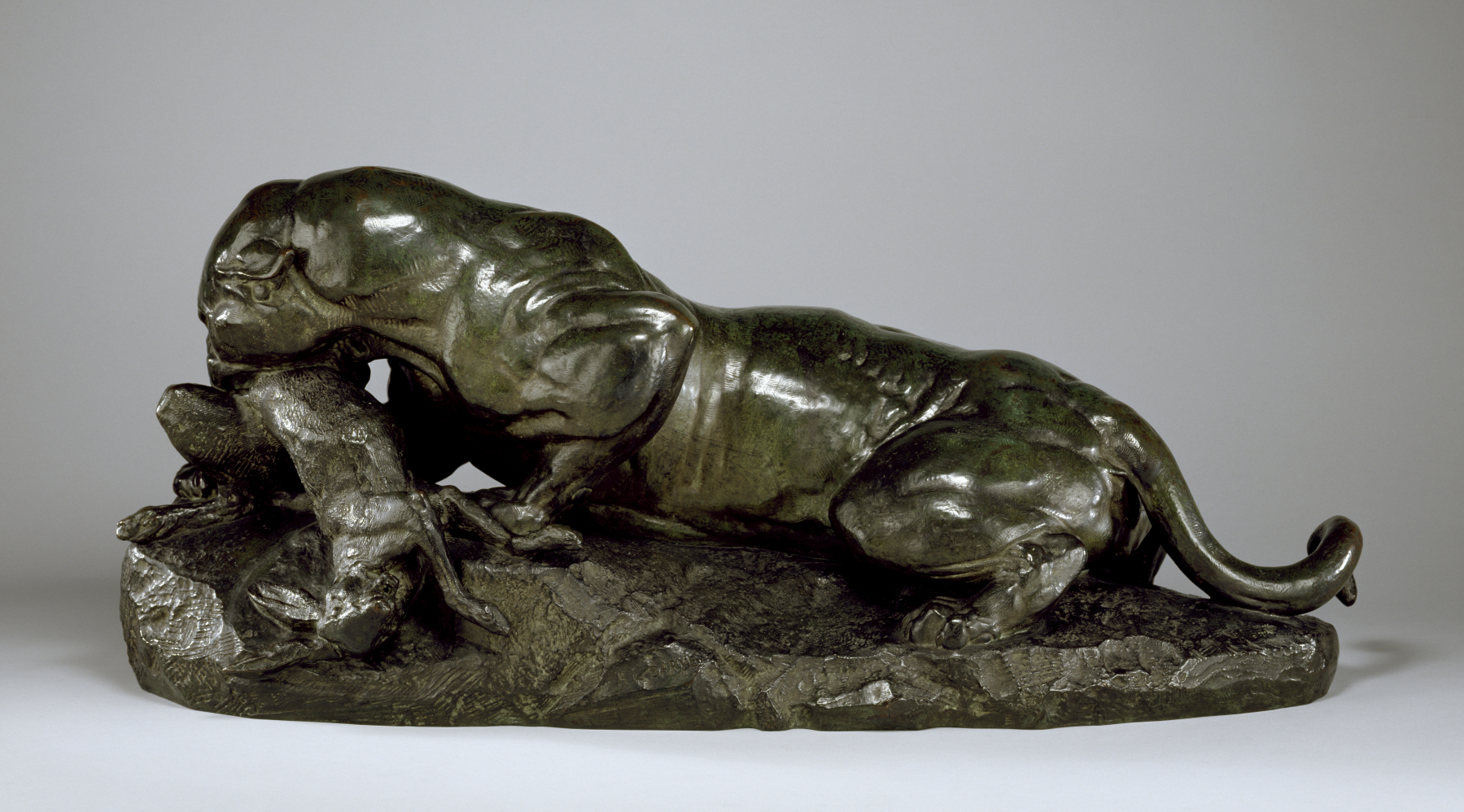
Jaguar Devouring a Hare by Antoine-Louis Barye

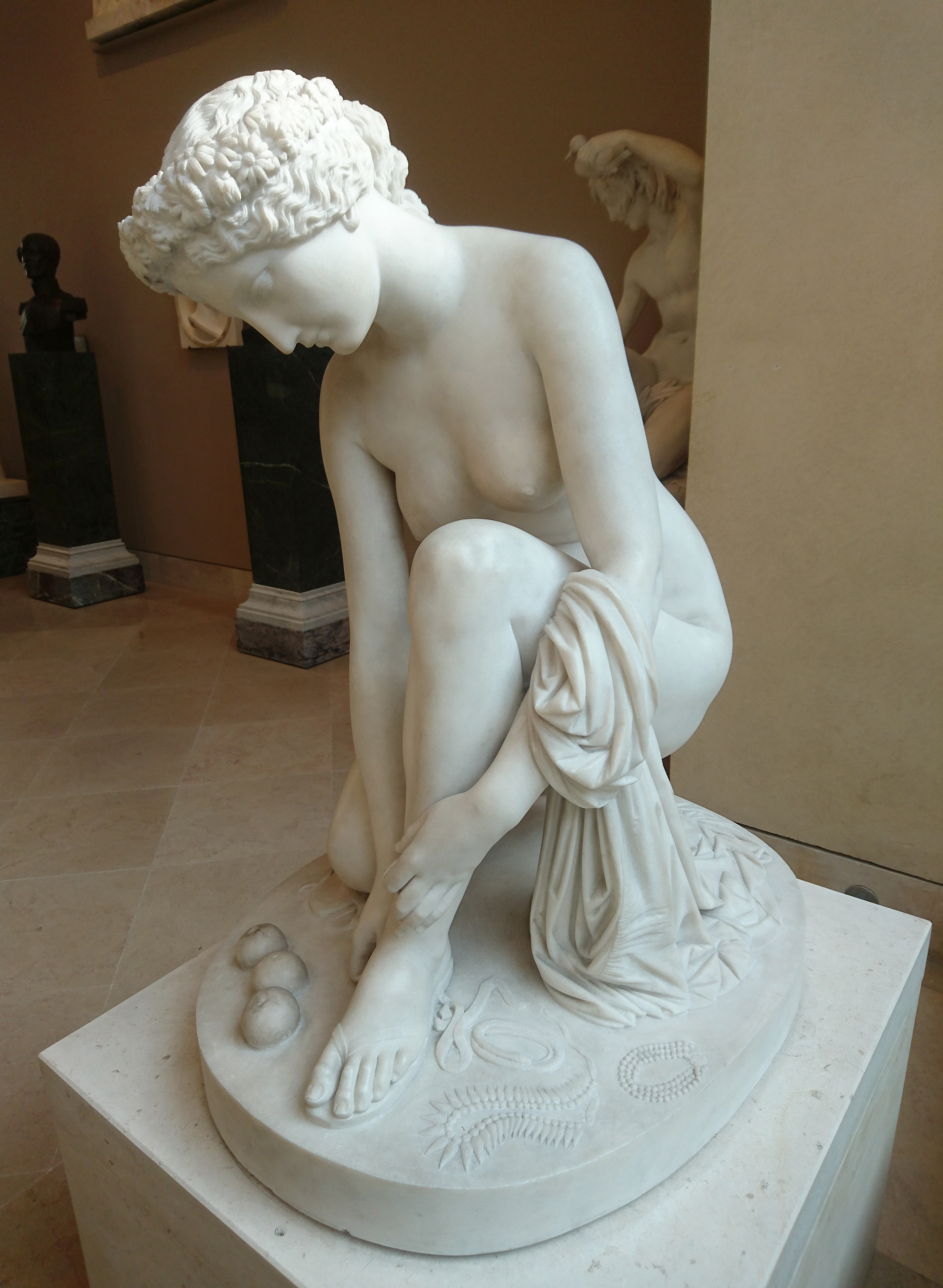
La Toilette d'Atalante by James Pradier

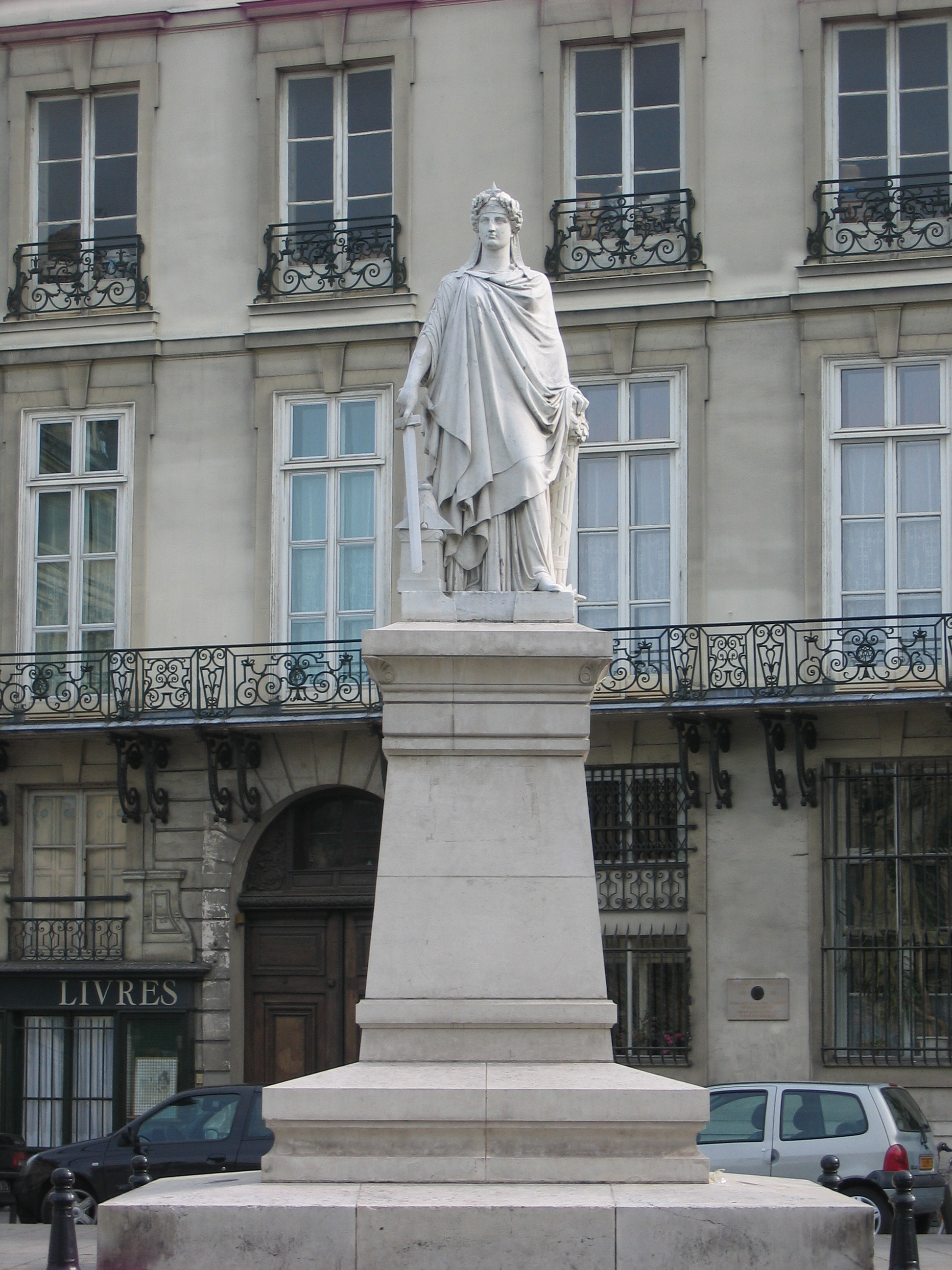
The Republic by Jean-François Soitoux

== See also ==
- Royal Academy Exhibition of 1850, which took place at the National Gallery in London

== Bibliography ==
- Allard, Sébastien & Fabre, Côme. Delacroix. Metropolitan Museum of Art, 2018.
- De Kay, Charles. Barye; Life and Works of Antoine Louis Barye, Sculptor. Barye Monument Association at New York, 1889.
- Jonckheere, Koenraad. A New History of Western Art: From Antiquity to the Present Day. Yale University Press, 2022.
- Lemoine, Bertrand. La Statue de la liberté. Mardaga, 1986.
- Murray, Christopher John. Encyclopedia of the Romantic Era, 1760–1850, Volume 2. Taylor & Francis, 2004.
- Wrightsman, Jayne. The Wrightsman Pictures. Metropolitan Museum of Art, 2005.
