= An Artist Showing His Work =

Painting by Ernest Meissonier

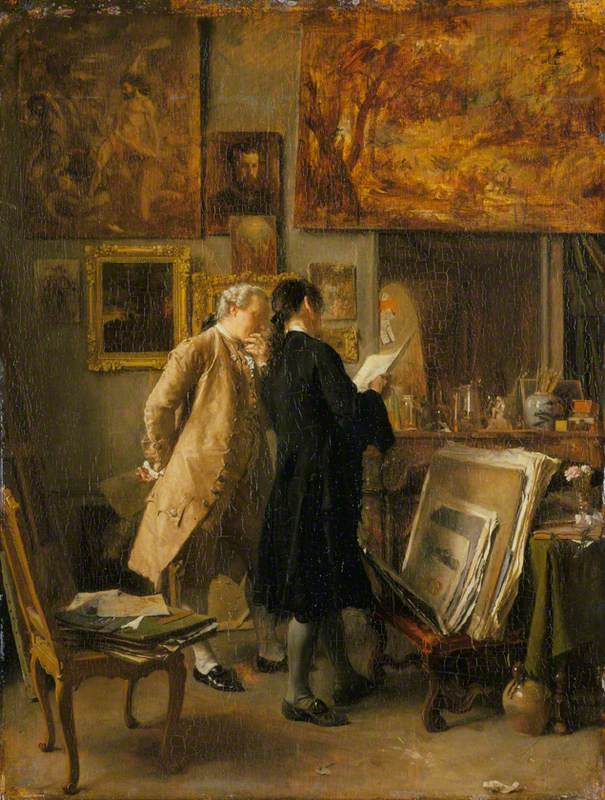
- Artist: Ernest Meissonier
- Year: c. 1850
- Type: Oil on panel, genre painting
- Dimensions: 37.5 cm × 29.1 cm (14.8 in × 11.5 in)
- Location: Wallace Collection, London

An Artist Showing His Work is an oil painting on canvas by the French artist Ernest Meissonier, from c. 1850.

== History and description ==
It features an artist displaying his work to a potential buyer. Although both men wear eighteenth century clothes, dating it a historical setting, the pictures on the wall are actually by Meissonier. The setting has been identified as the painter's own studio at the Quai de Bourbon.

Meissonier made his name with such relatively small genre paintings before later switching to larger, more grand compositions as he became more established in academic art. The current painting was displayed at the Salon of 1850 held at the Louvre, in Paris. It was acquired by the British art collector Marquess of Herford, having previously belonged to the Duke de Morny. Today it is part of the Wallace Collection in Hertford's former residence in Manchester Square in London.

== Bibliography ==
- Ingamells, John. The Wallace Collection: French Nineteenth Century. Trustees of the Wallace Collection, 1985.
- King, Ross. The Judgement of Paris: The Revolutionary Decade that Gave the World Impressionism. Pimlico, 2007.
- Mainardi, Patricia. Art and Politics of the Second Empire: The Universal Expositions of 1855 and 1867. Yale University Press, 1987.
