= The Dance of the Nymphs =

Painting by Jean-Baptiste-Camille Corot

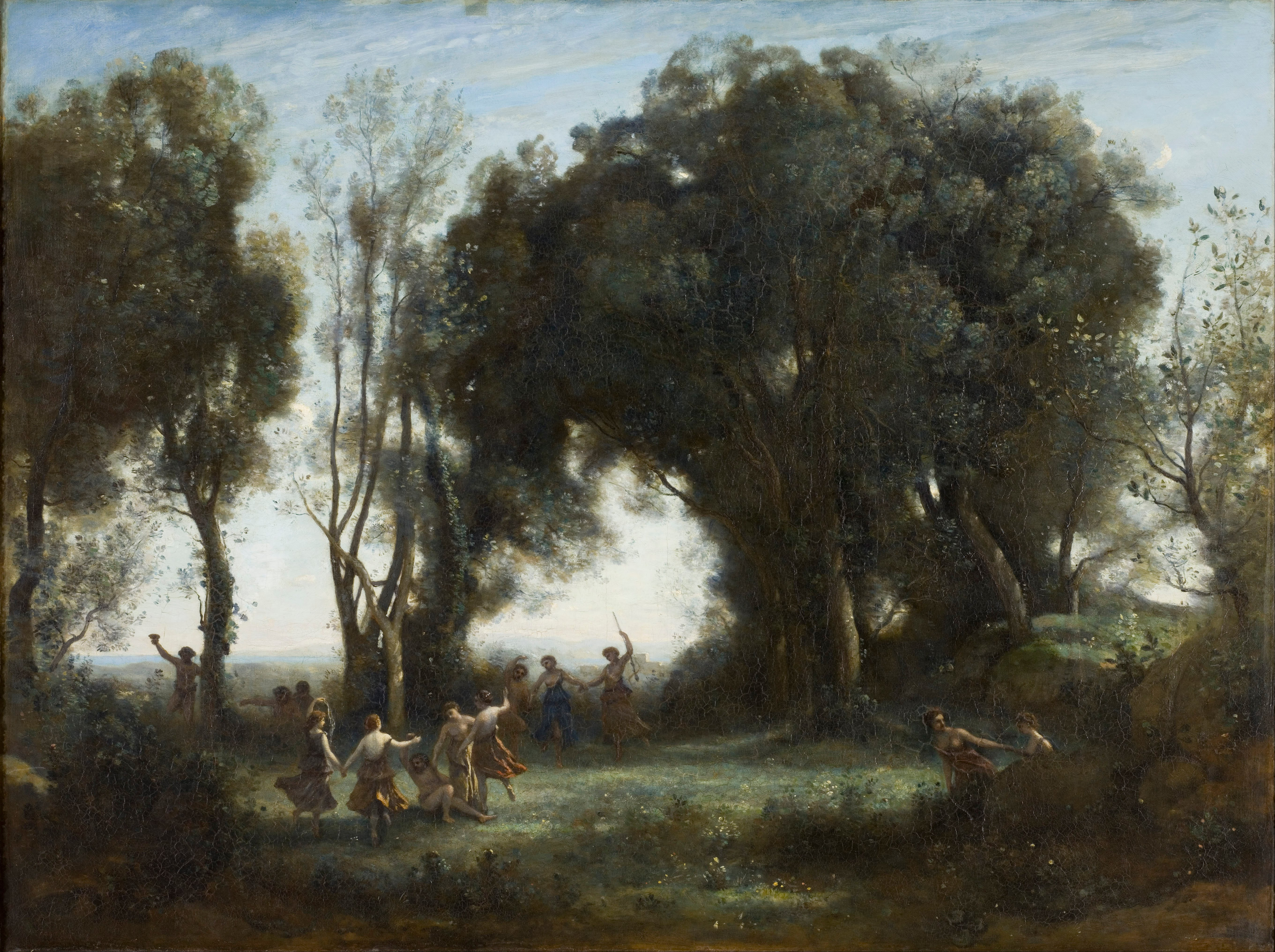
- Artist: Jean-Baptiste-Camille Corot
- Year: 1850
- Type: Oil on canvas, Landscape painting
- Dimensions: 98 cm × 131 cm (39 in × 52 in)
- Location: Musée d'Orsay, Paris

The Dance of the Nymphs (French: La Danse des nymphes) is an 1850 oil painting by the French artist Jean-Baptiste-Camille Corot. A landscape, it displays a group of nymphs dancing in a wooded glen. It is also known by the longer title Morning: The Dance of the Nymphs.

Corot was a leading participant in the Barbizon School, influencing the later Impressionist movement. The painting was displayed at the Salon of 1850 at the Louvre in Paris. It was acquired by the French state in 1851. Today it is in the collection of the Musée d'Orsay

== Bibliography ==
- Boime, Albert. Art in an Age of Counterrevolution, 1815-1848. University of Chicago Press, 2004.
- Gärtner, Peter J. & Padberg, Martina & Sander, Birgit & Stukenbrock, Christiane. Musée D'Orsay: Art & Architecture. Könemann, 2001.
