= Trial by Jury (disambiguation) =

Trial by Jury is an 1875 comic opera in one act, with music by Arthur Sullivan and libretto by W. S. Gilbert.

Trial by Jury may also refer to:

== Law ==
- Trial by jury or jury trial, a type of legal proceeding

== Television ==
- Trial by Jury (TV series), a 1989-90 scripted television court show
- Trial by Jury (film), a 1994 American thriller film by Heywood Gould
- Law & Order: Trial by Jury, a 2005-2006 American television drama

== Postmodern art ==
- Trial by Jury (painting) or Laying Down the Law, an 1840 oil-on-canvas painting by Sir Edwin Landseer
