= Lion, a Newfoundland Dog =

Painting by Edwin Landseer

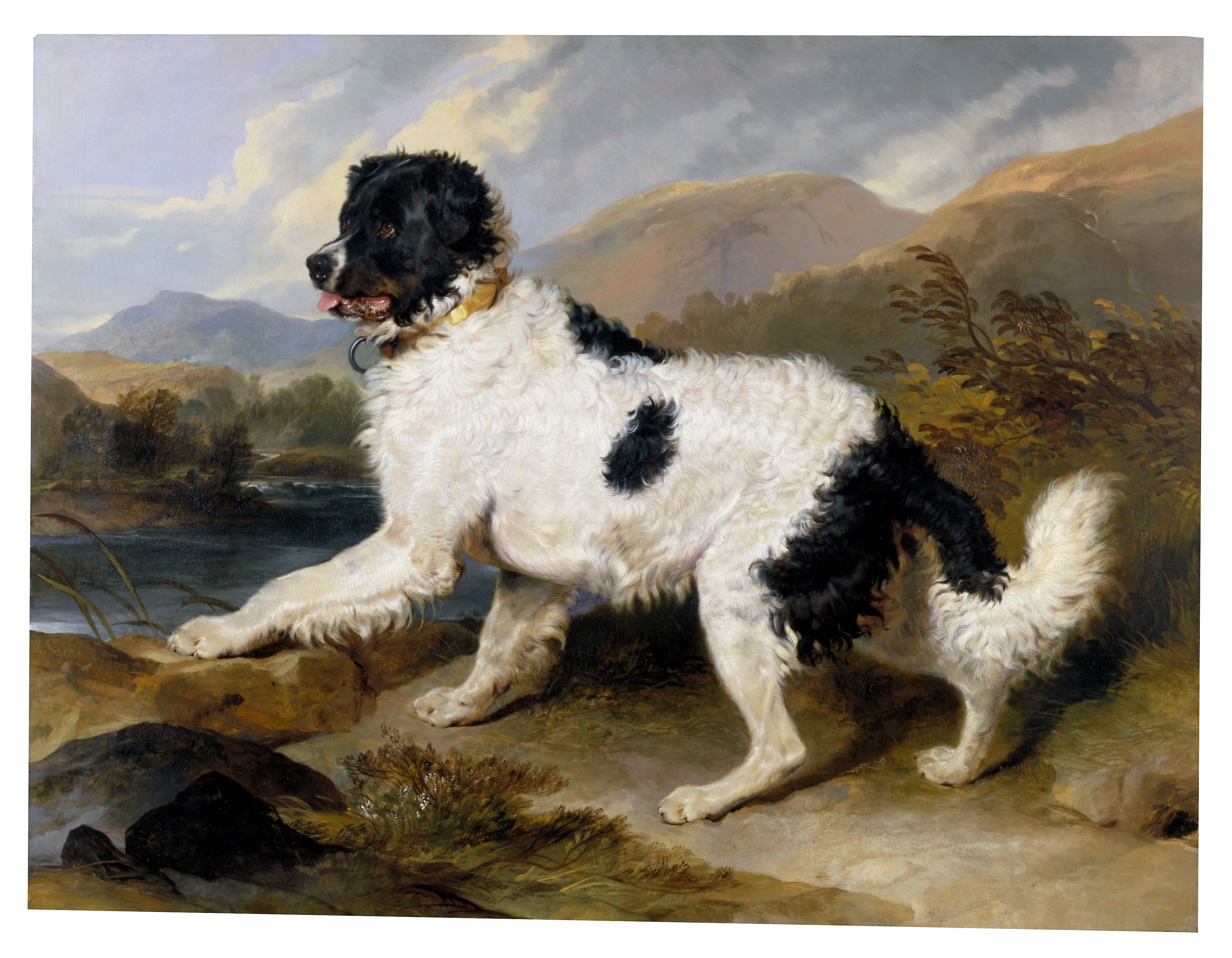
- Artist: Edwin Landseer
- Year: 1824
- Type: Oil on canvas, portrait
- Dimensions: 149.8 cm × 195.6 cm (59.0 in × 77.0 in)
- Location: Victoria and Albert Museum, London

Lion, a Newfoundland Dog is an 1824 oil painting by the English artist Edwin Landseer. It portrays a variant of the traditional Newfoundland dog, now known as the Landseer dog due to its use in this painting and others by Landseer including A Distinguished Member of the Humane Society in 1831.

This work was commissioned by Lion's owner. The background depicts the Scottish countryside. Today the painting is in the collection of the Victoria and Albert Museum in London.

== Bibliography ==
- Gray, Beryl. The Dog in the Dickensian Imagination. Routledge, 2016.
- Manson, James A. Sir Edwin Landseer, R. A.. W. Scott Publishing Company, 1902.
- Roe, Sonia. Oil Paintings in Public Ownership in the Victoria and Albert Museum. Public Catalogue Foundation, 2008.
