= The Monarch of the Glen (painting) =

Painting by Edwin Henry Landseer

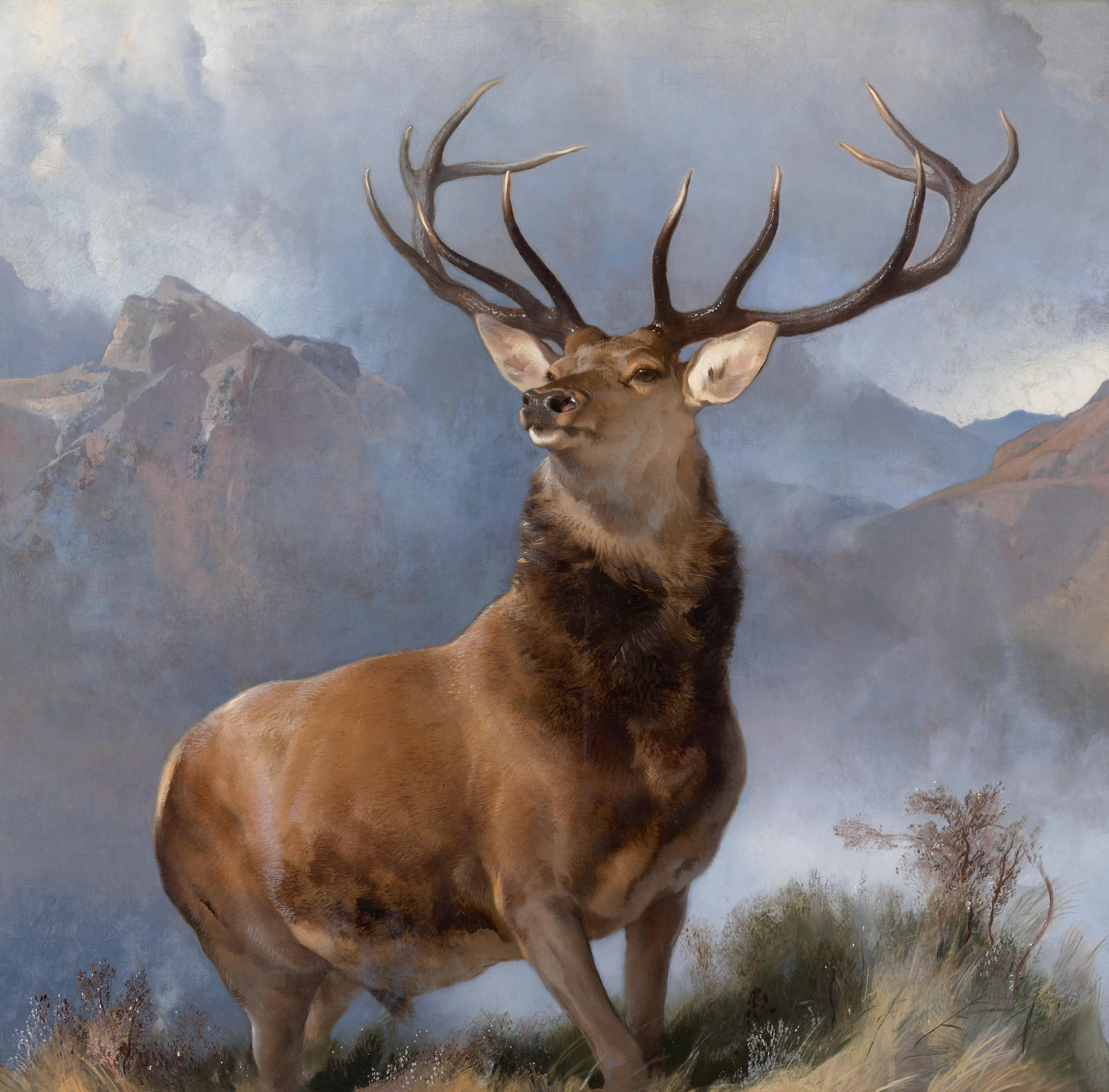
- Artist: Sir Edwin Landseer
- Year: 1851
- Medium: Oil-on-canvas
- Dimensions: 163.8 cm × 168.9 cm (64.5 in × 66.5 in)
- Location: Scottish National Gallery, Edinburgh

The Monarch of the Glen is an oil-on-canvas painting of a red deer stag completed in 1851 by the English painter Sir Edwin Landseer. It was commissioned as part of a series of three panels to hang in the Palace of Westminster, in London. As one of the most popular paintings throughout the 19th century, it sold widely in reproductions in steel engraving, and was finally bought by companies to use in advertising. The painting had become something of a cliché by the mid-20th century, as "the ultimate biscuit-tin image of Scotland: a bulky stag set against the violet hills and watery skies of an isolated wilderness", according to the Sunday Herald.

In 2017 the National Galleries of Scotland in Edinburgh launched a successful campaign to buy the painting for £4 million, finally achieving the acquisition. The painting is now part of the collection, and is on display at the Scottish National Gallery. However, Stoke Park, a resort in Stoke Poges, Buckinghamshire claims that Landseer often frequented the resort which was at the time known to have deer. And therefore claim that whilst the setting itself is a highland scene, the stag in the centre of the composition is from Buckinghamshire.

== History ==
Landseer was a member of the Royal Academy, a favourite of Queen Victoria, and had become famous for his paintings and drawings of animals. His later works include the sculptures of the lions at the foot of Nelson's Column in Trafalgar Square. From the 1840s, he produced a series of intricately observed studies of stags based on those he had seen on the trips he had been making to the Scottish Highlands since 1824. In 1850, Landseer received a national commission to paint three subjects connected with the chase for the Refreshment Rooms of the House of Lords, for which he produced Monarch of the Glen and two other paintings. Once they were completed the House of Commons refused to grant the £150 promised for the commission (equivalent to £17,459 in 2025), and, as a result, the paintings were sold to private collectors. It has been claimed that the landscape setting shows Glen Affric: the memoirs of Lady Aberdeen, whose father and brother had owned the Glen Affric Estate - 'the old and new Glen Affaric lodge' - record that Landseer had been a visitor to their home.

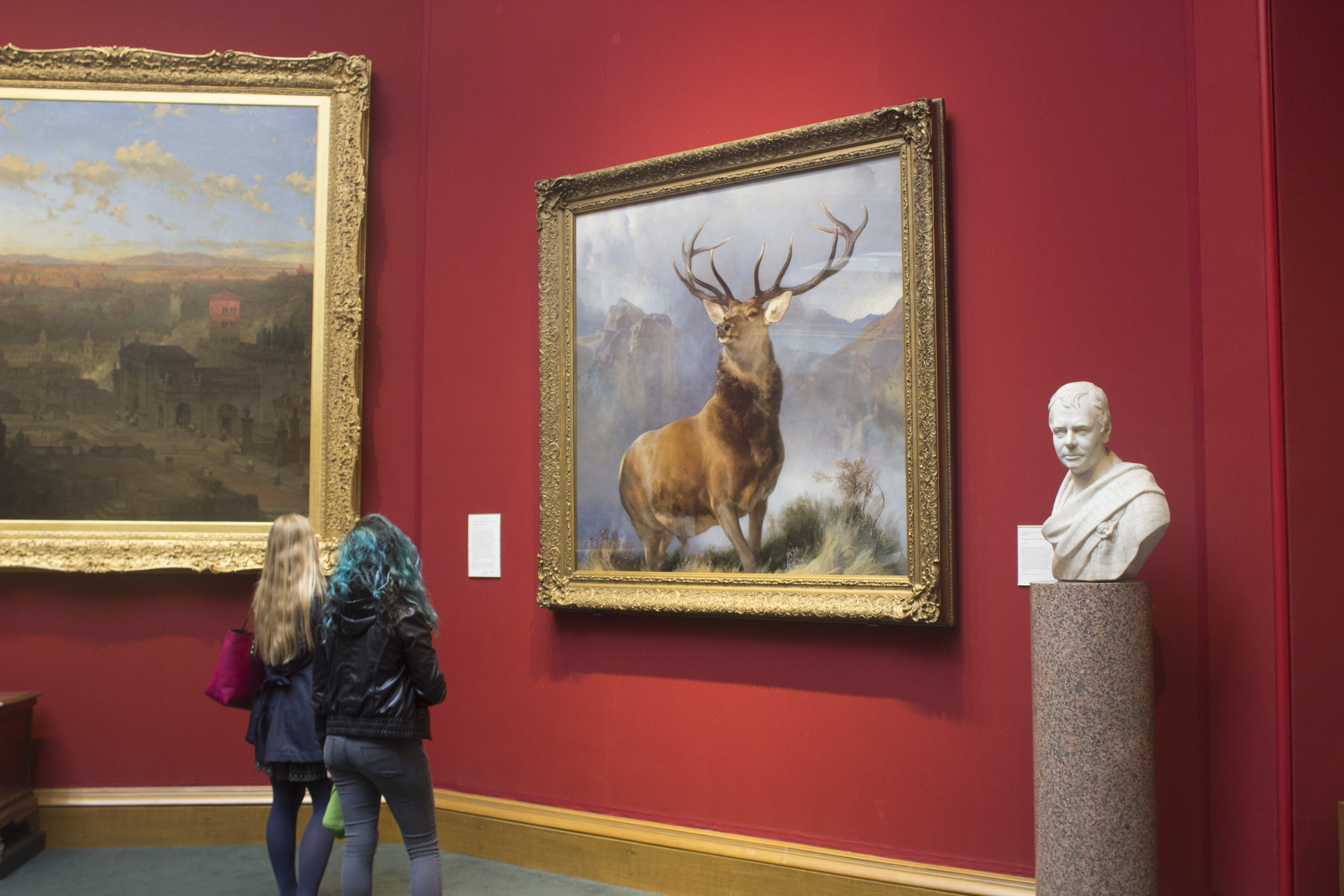
The Monarch of the Glen in the Scottish National Gallery

It was exhibited in London in 1851, 1874 and 1890. From the collection of William Denison, 1st Earl of Londesborough it passed in 1884 to Henry Eaton, 1st Baron Cheylesmore after whose death in 1891 it realized £7,245 at his sale at Christie's in May 1892 (equivalent to £795,878 in 2025), where it was bought by Agnew's, who resold it to T. Barratt for £8,000. In 1916 he resold it at Christie's for £5,250 (equivalent to £394,834 in 2025). The price in 1892 was the highest made by a Landseer before the 1960s, with the exception of a rumoured price of £10,000 in a private sale of The Otter Hunt in 1873, which would have then represented the highest price ever paid for a British painting.

The painting was purchased in 1916 by Pears soap company and featured in their advertising. It was sold on to John Dewar & Sons distillery and became their trademark before similarly being used by Glenfiddich. The painting was then acquired as part of the purchase of Dewar's by Diageo. In 1997 Diageo sold Dewar's to Bacardi but this did not include ancillary assets. Diageo then loaned the painting to the National Museum of Scotland in Edinburgh.

On 2 November 2016, Diageo announced their intention to sell the painting, as they stated it had "no direct link to our business or brands". The National Galleries of Scotland was offered the painting, valued at £8 million, at half this price, if they could raise the required £4 million. A campaign was then launched to raise the funds, which succeeded.

== Modern derivatives and corporate logos ==
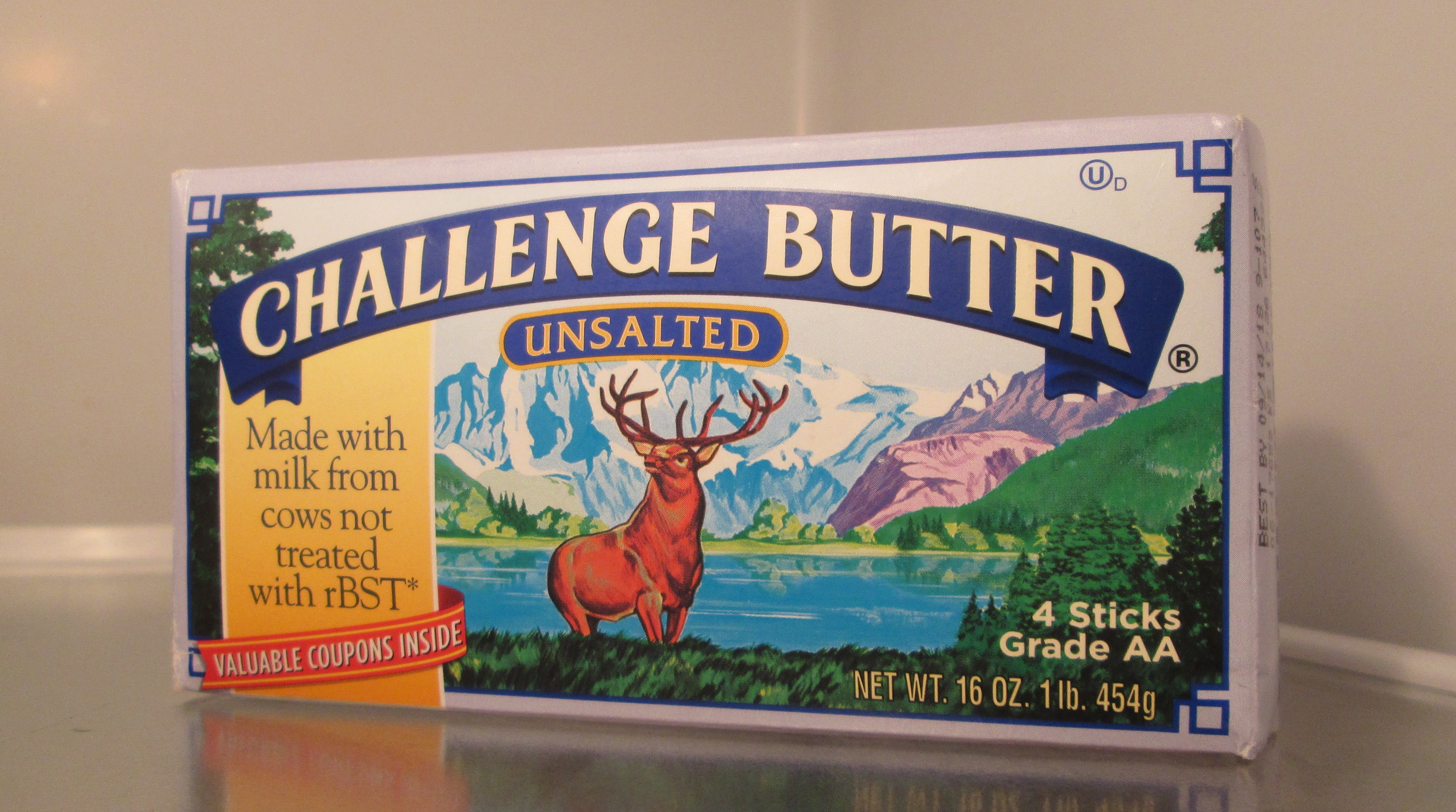
A carton of Challenge butter featuring a stylised depiction of the painting

According to the Sunday Herald, the painting became a cliché by the mid 20th century as "the ultimate biscuit tin image of Scotland"; its usage included a 1940s tin of McVitie's shortbread.

The painting has many copiers. One, The Challenger, was an inspiration for the sides of delivery trucks for Challenge Dairies whose heritage was later added to butter cartons in stores. Glenfiddich single malt Scotch whisky has used a variation of Landseer's stag image in its logo since 1968.

Company legend has it the first President of Challenge Cream and Butter Association, J.P. Murphy, now Challenge Dairy of California, chose the name from a variation of the mural, depicted on the company's current logo.

In 2012 Peter Saville collaborated with Dovecot Studios Edinburgh to celebrate their centenary by creating a large scale tapestry of his work After, After, After Monarch of the Glen. This tapestry was Dovecot Studios' re-appropriation of Saville's version of Sir Peter Blake's usage of Landseer's 1851 painting.

The painting has also been used on the label of tins of Baxter's Royal Game soup in the UK, and as the backdrop for the front desk of the Rosebudd Motel from the Canadian television sitcom, Schitt's Creek.

The deer shown in the painting was used as part of a collage on the sleeve of the 1983 Electric Light Orchestra album Secret Messages.

The Hartford Insurance Company's logo, named Larry, is based on the painting.

== See also ==
- A Distinguished Member of the Humane Society
- Laying Down the Law
