= A Distinguished Member of the Humane Society =

Painting by Edwin Landseer

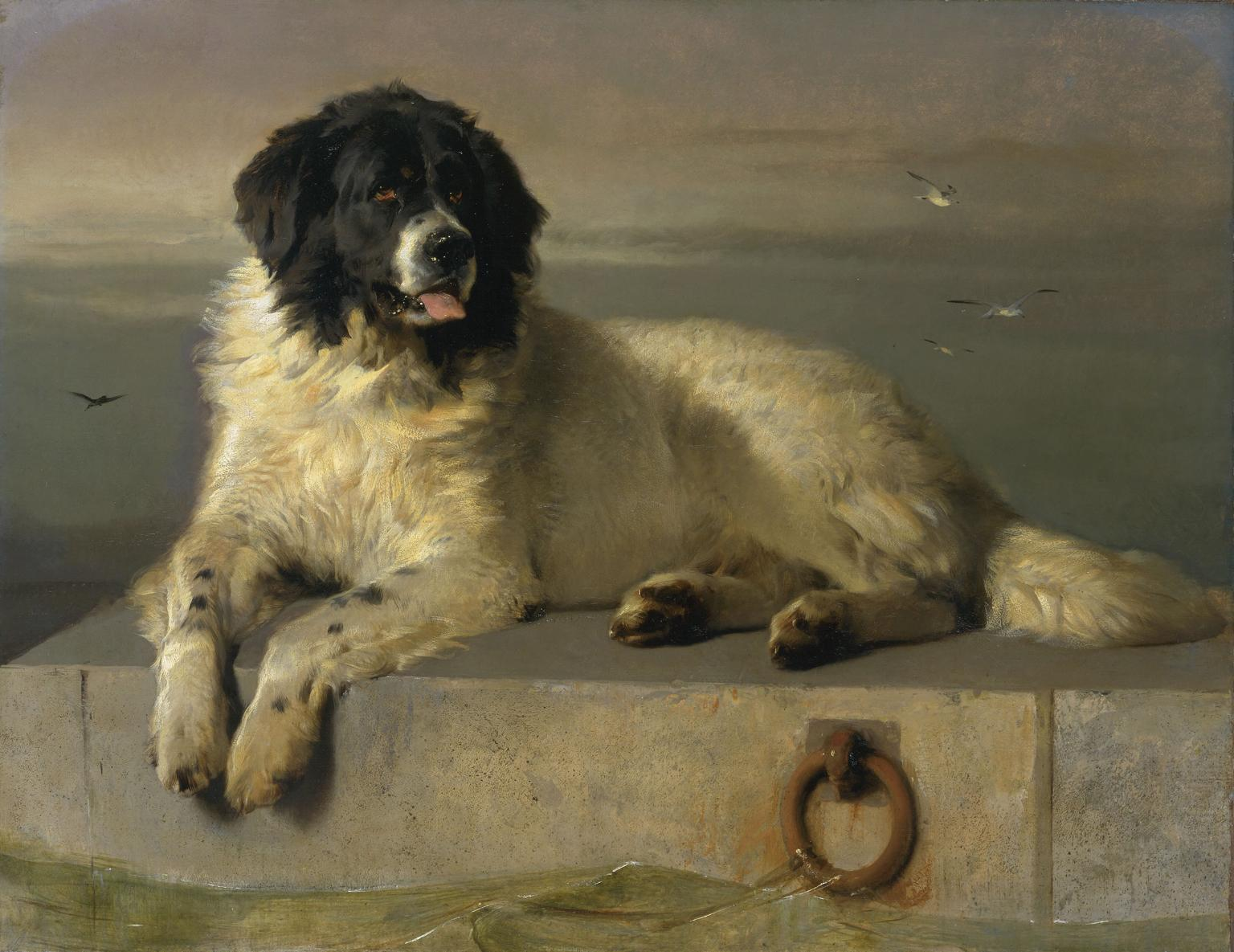
- Artist: Sir Edwin Henry Landseer
- Year: 1831
- Medium: Oil on canvas
- Dimensions: 111.8 cm × 143.5 cm (44.0 in × 56.5 in)
- Location: Tate Collection

A Distinguished Member of the Humane Society is an 1831 oil on canvas work by English painter Sir Edwin Henry Landseer depicting a Newfoundland dog. These dogs are recognised in Europe as a breed in their own right, the Landseer E.C.T. named after the painter. The original was damaged in a flood whilst on loan to the Tate Gallery in 1928, and was returned to public view for the first time in 50 years after it was restored in 2009.

== Background ==
The dog in the painting is meant to be "Bob", a dog that was found in a shipwreck off the coast of England. The dog found his way to the London waterfront where he became known for saving people from drowning, a total of twenty–three times over the course of fourteen years. For this, he was made a distinguished member of the Royal Humane Society, granting him a medal and access to food.

The painting was bequeathed to the Tate Collection by Newman Smith in 1887. The painting was damaged in a flood at the London Tate Gallery in 1928, which required extensive restoration work which was funded by the Newfoundland Dog Club of America. Following the restoration work which was coordinated by Ron Pemberton, the painting went on display at the Philadelphia Museum of Art from 2002 to 2005. The painting went on loan to The Kennel Club in 2009 in order to form part of the Pets & Prizewinners exhibition at the Kennel Club Art Gallery in London. Prior to this display, it had been unseen in the UK for over fifty years. The coloration of the breed as featured in the painting has become known as a "Landseer". The painting is now on long term loan to the Royal Kennel Club Gallery (formally the Kennel Club Gallery) at their head office in Clarges Street, London where it can be seen weekdays (check their website for opening times) alongside pieces from the Royal Kennel Club and the Kennel Club Arts Foundation (KCAF) collection's free of charge. Displayed alongside it is a preparatory sketch by the artist.

A 19th century copy of the painting by George Cole was sold by auctioneers Bonhams for £7,200 in March 2007.

== Aesthetics ==
The dog is painted against a threatening dull sky, in order to highlight the dog himself with the darkened markings on his head standing out. The dog reclines on a quayside, while water ripples against the sea-wall. The shadow of the dog is cast on his own flank. The painting was described by The Art Journal as being "one of the best and most interesting publications of the year", and "Mr Thomas Landseer's first great effort in this department of the art."

== See also ==
- Monarch of the Glen
- Laying Down The Law
