= Landseer (dog breed) =

Breed of dog from Canada

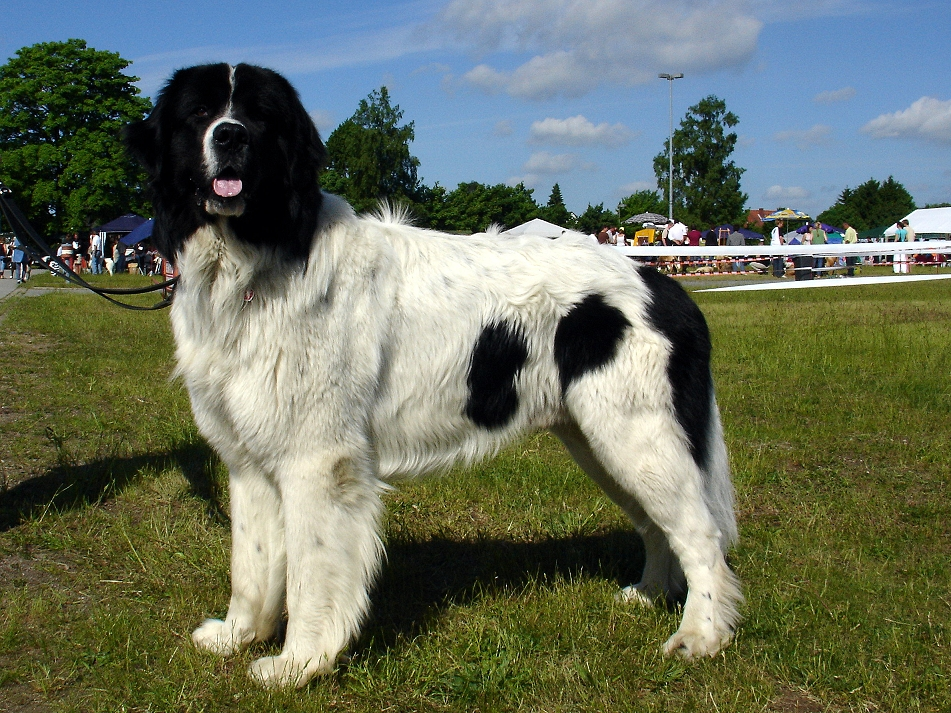
- Other names: Landseer Newfoundland
- Origin: Canada
- Foundation stock: Newfoundland
Traits
- Height: 26–28 in (66–71 cm)
- Weight: 100–150 lb (45–68 kg)
- Coat: Long
- Color: Black & white

Landseer ECT
- Other names: European Continental Type
Traits
- Height: 26–31 in (67–80 cm)
Weight	Males	Average 150 lb (68 kg)
	Females	Average 119 lb (54 kg)
Kennel club standards
- Fédération Cynologique Internationale: standard

The Landseer is a dog that originated in Germany and Switzerland. It is a black-and-white descendent of the Newfoundland that is recognized as an independent breed in continental Europe.

== History ==
The Landseer ECT is descended from dogs used by fishermen in the Newfoundland and Labrador region of Canada. It is believed these dogs are descended from water dogs and livestock guardian dogs imported by Portuguese and Basque fishing vessels. In the Victorian era black-and-white Newfoundland dogs were more popular than the solid black coloration, and they were the subject of a number of 19th-century artists including Sydenham Edwards, Philip Reinagle, Samuel Jones, and most famously Edwin Landseer, whose name was used to describe black-and-white Newfoundlands as early as 1896.

In the 20th century the solid black coloration became more popular and supplanted the bi-colored animals, so much so that in the 1930s a concerted effort was made to recreate the dogs seen in the paintings of Landseer. The efforts of these breeders resulted in the Landseer breed. In Great Britain and North America, Landseer coloured dogs are a variety of the Newfoundland breed that is identical in conformation and origin to the black variety of Newfoundland. In 1960 a separate breed club for tall Landseer-coloured dogs was created in Germany registering dogs of Landseer-coloured Newfoundland crossed to livestock guardian dogs. Similar clubs soon followed in Belgium and Holland. The breed has not been imported to Canada and the United States, where Landseer-coloured Newfoundlands are popular.

== Genetics ==
The Landseer's black and white colouration arises from the piebald colour allele found in Newfoundlands; while the piebald gene is considered recessive, heterozygous individuals usually display small white markings. Solid-coloured and Landseer-coloured puppies can occur in the same litter of Newfoundland; whereas ECT Landseers are always piebald. Developed to look like the illustrations of Edwin Landseer and others, the ECT Landseer also differs in shape from the Newfoundland: it is taller with longer legs and less bulk, and a longer, more tapered head – its coat is said to be curlier whilst the Newfoundland's is said to be wavier.

A study in 2015 found a special gene in Landseers with muscular dystrophy, called COL6A1. The affected dogs represent a closer animal model for human Ullrich congenital muscular dystrophy than that previously created in mice.

Paintings of Newfoundlands by Sir Edwin Landseer

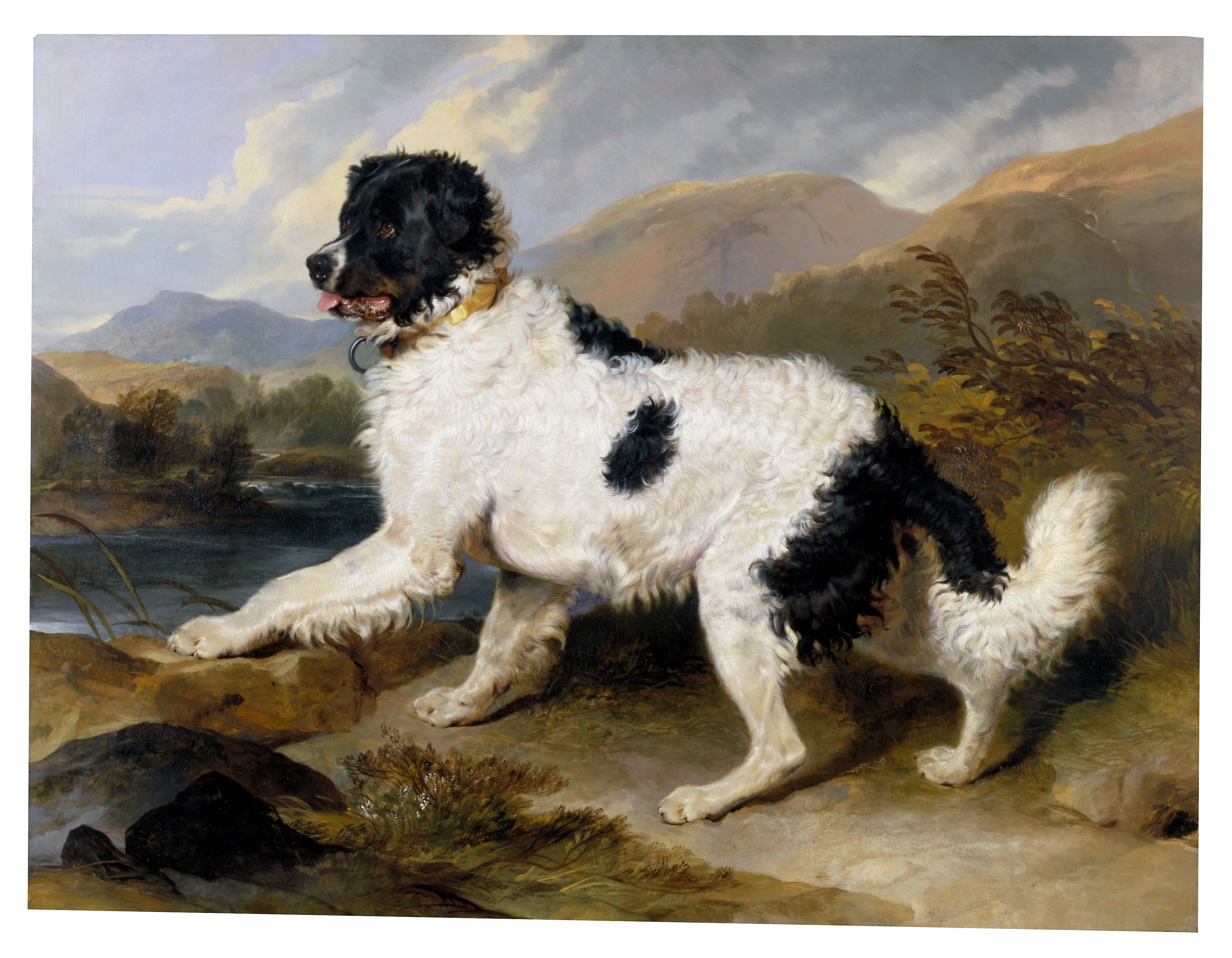
Lion, a Newfoundland Dog, 1824

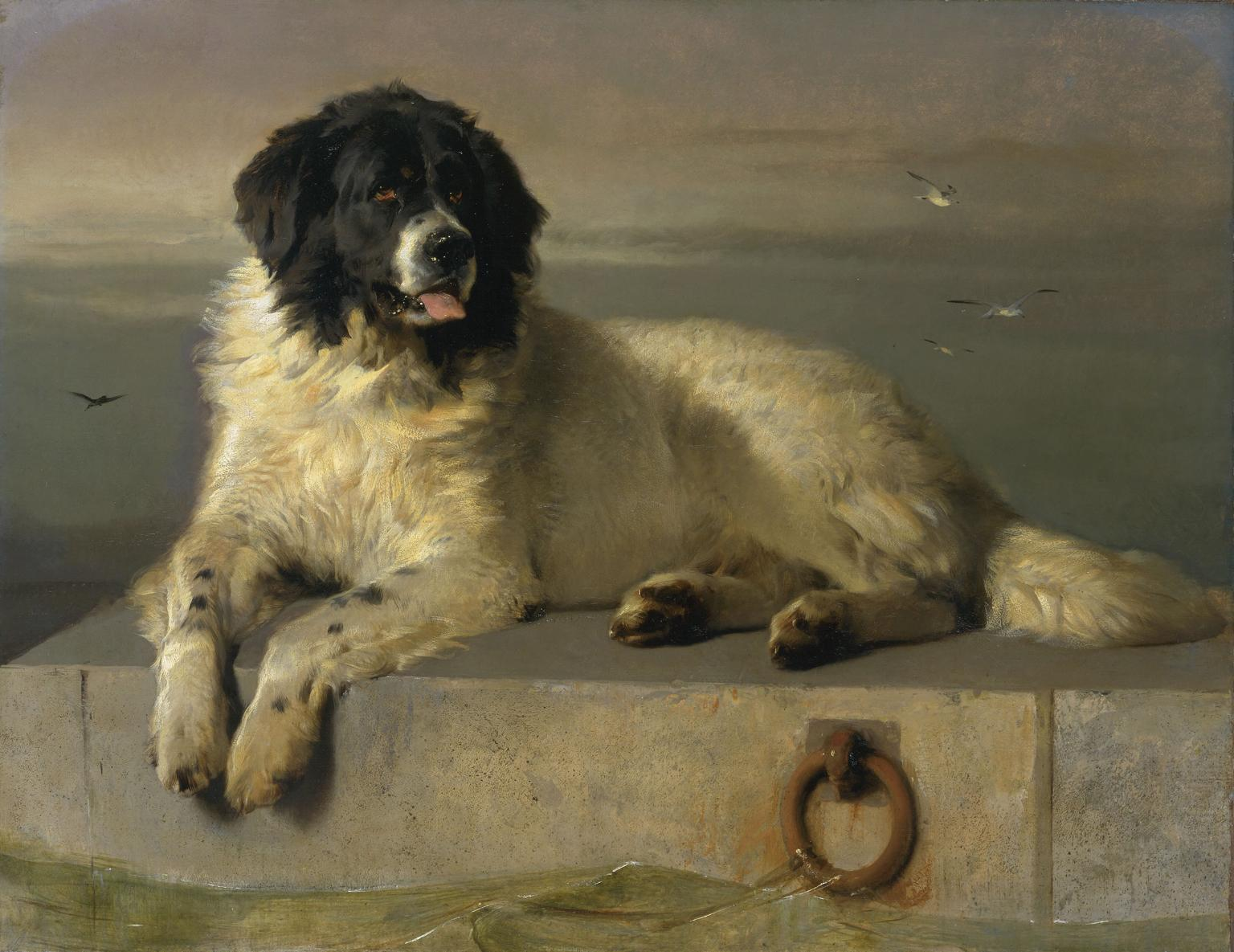
A Distinguished Member of the Humane Society, 1838

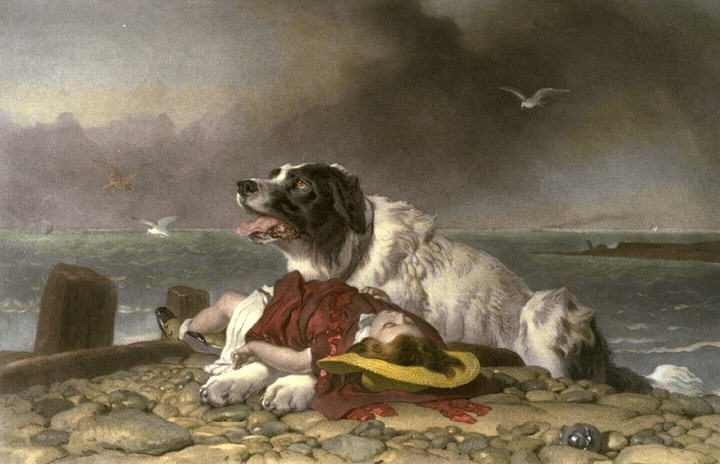
Saved, 1856

== See also ==
- List of dog breeds
