= Edwin Landseer =

English painter and sculptor (1802–1873)

Sir Edwin Landseer RA
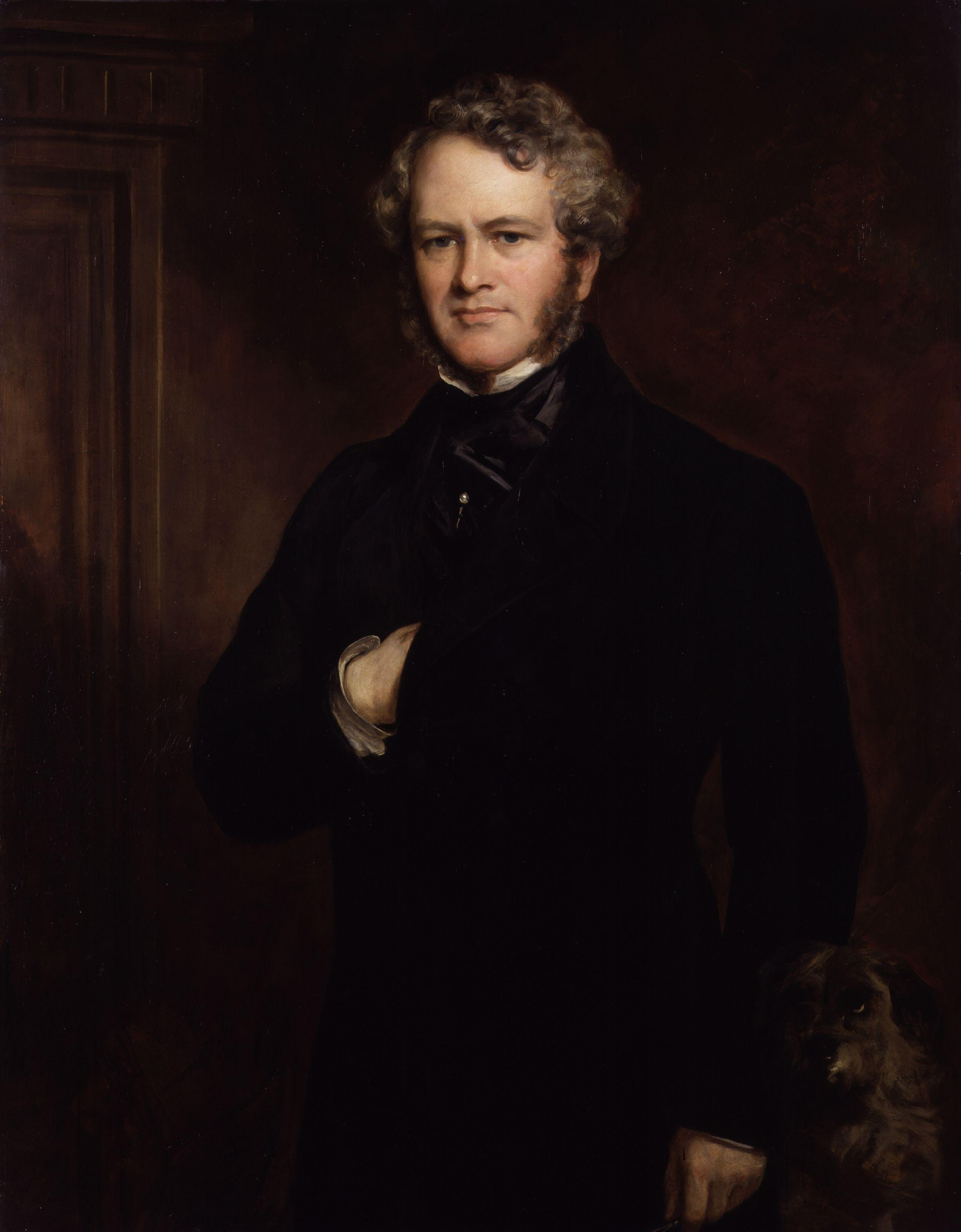
- Portrait of Sir Edwin Landseer by Francis Grant, 1852
- Born: Edwin Henry Landseer; 7 March 1802; London, England
- Died: 1 October 1873 (aged 71); London, England
- Education: Royal Academy Schools
- Known for: Painting; sculpture
- Movement: Animalier
- Parents: John Landseer (father); Jane Potts (mother)
- Awards: Great gold medal of the Exposition Universelle (1855)

Sir Edwin Henry Landseer RA (7 March 1802 – 1 October 1873) was an English painter and sculptor, well known for his paintings of animals – particularly horses, dogs, and stags. His best-known work is the lion sculptures at the base of Nelson's Column in Trafalgar Square.

== Life ==
Landseer was born in London, the son of the engraver John Landseer A.R.A. and Jane Potts. He was something of a prodigy whose artistic talents were recognised early on. He studied under several artists, including his father, and the history painter Benjamin Robert Haydon, who encouraged the young Landseer to perform dissections in order to fully understand animal musculature and skeletal structure. Landseer's life was entwined with the Royal Academy. At the age of just 13, in 1815, he exhibited works there as an “Honorary Exhibitor”. He was elected an Associate at the minimum age of 24, and an Academician five years later in 1831.

He was an acquaintance of Charles Robert Leslie, who described him as "a curly-headed youngster, dividing his time between Polito's wild beasts at Exeter Change and the Royal Academy Schools." They also visited Scotland together in 1824, which had a great effect upon Landseer.

In 1823 Landseer was commissioned to paint a portrait of Georgiana Russell, Duchess of Bedford. Despite her being twenty years older than he was, they began an affair. Contemporary gossip had it that Landseer was the father of at least one of her children, Lady Rachel Russell.

He was knighted in 1850, and although elected to be President of the Royal Academy in 1866 he declined the invitation and the position went to Francis Grant. In his late thirties Landseer suffered what is now believed to be a substantial nervous breakdown, and for the rest of his life was troubled by recurring bouts of melancholy, hypochondria, and depression, often aggravated by alcohol and drug use. In the last few years of his life Landseer's mental stability was problematic, and at the request of his family he was declared insane in July 1872.

== Painting ==
Landseer was a notable figure in 19th-century British art, and his works can be found in Tate Britain, the Victoria and Albert Museum, Kenwood House and the Wallace Collection in London. He also collaborated with fellow painter Frederick Richard Lee.

Landseer's popularity in Victorian Britain was considerable, and his reputation as an animal painter was unrivalled. Much of his fame – and his income – was generated by the publication of engravings of his work, many of them by his brother Thomas.

One of his earliest paintings is credited as the origin of the myth that St. Bernard rescue dogs in the Alps carry a small casket of brandy on their collars. Alpine Mastiffs Reanimating a Distressed Traveller (1820) shows two of the dogs standing over a man who is partially buried in snow. One is barking to attract attention while the other, who is depicted with the miniature barrel, attempts to revive the man by licking his hand.

His appeal crossed class boundaries: reproductions of his works were common in middle-class homes, while he was also popular with the aristocracy. Queen Victoria commissioned numerous pictures from the artist. Initially asked to paint various royal pets, he then moved on to portraits of ghillies and gamekeepers. Then, in the year before her marriage, the queen commissioned a portrait of herself. He taught both Victoria and Albert to etch, and made portraits of Victoria's children as babies, usually in the company of a dog. He also made two portraits of Victoria and Albert dressed for costume balls, at which he was a guest himself. One of his last paintings was a life-size equestrian portrait of the Queen, shown at the Royal Academy in 1873, made from earlier sketches.

Landseer was particularly associated with Scotland, which he had first visited in 1824 and the Highlands in particular, which provided the subjects (both human and animal) for many of his important paintings. The paintings included his early successes The Hunting of Chevy Chase(1825–26), The Illicit Highland Whisky Still (1826–1829) and his more mature achievements, such as the majestic stag study The Monarch of the Glen (1851) and Rent Day in the Wilderness (1855–1868). In 1828, he was commissioned to produce illustrations for the Waverley Edition of Sir Walter Scott's novels.

So popular and influential were Landseer's paintings of dogs in the service of humanity that the name Landseer came to be the official name for the variety of Newfoundland dog that, rather than being black or mostly black, features a mixture of both black and white. It was this variety Landseer popularised in his paintings celebrating Newfoundlands as water rescue dogs, most notably Off to the Rescue (1827), A Distinguished Member of the Humane Society (1838), and Saved (1856). The paintings combine the Victorian conception of childhood with the appealing idea of noble animals devoted to humankind, a devotion indicated, in Saved, by the fact the dog has rescued the child without any apparent human involvement.

Landseer's painting Laying Down The Law (c. 1840) satirises the legal profession through anthropomorphism. It shows a group of dogs, with a poodle symbolising the Lord Chancellor.

The Shrew Tamed was entered at the 1861 Royal Academy Exhibition and caused controversy because of its subject matter. It showed a powerful horse on its knees among straw in a stable, while a young woman lies with her head pillowed on its flanks, lightly touching its head with her hand. The catalogue explained it as a portrait of a noted equestrienne, Ann Gilbert, applying the taming techniques of the famous 'horse whisperer' John Solomon Rarey. Critics were troubled by the depiction of a languorous woman dominating a powerful animal and some concluded Landseer was implying the famous courtesan Catherine Walters, then at the height of her fame. Walters was an excellent horsewoman and along with other "pretty horsebreakers", frequently appeared riding in Hyde Park.

Some of Landseer's later works, such as his Flood in the Highlands and Man Proposes, God Disposes (both of 1864) are pessimistic in tone. The latter shows two polar bears toying with the bones of the dead and other remains, from Sir John Franklin's failed Arctic expedition. The painting was purchased at auction by Thomas Holloway and hangs in the picture gallery of Royal Holloway, University of London. It is a college tradition to cover the painting with a Union Jack, when exams are held in the gallery, as there is a longstanding rumour that the painting drives people mad when they sit near it. In 1862 Landseer painted a portrait of Louisa Caroline Stewart-Mackenzie holding her daughter Maysie.

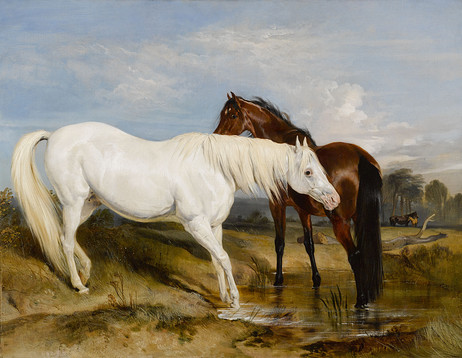
Portrait of an Arab Mare with her Foal by Sir Edwin Henry Landseer. (c.1825). Commissioned by Princess Charlotte for her lady-in-waiting, Lady Barbara Ponsonby

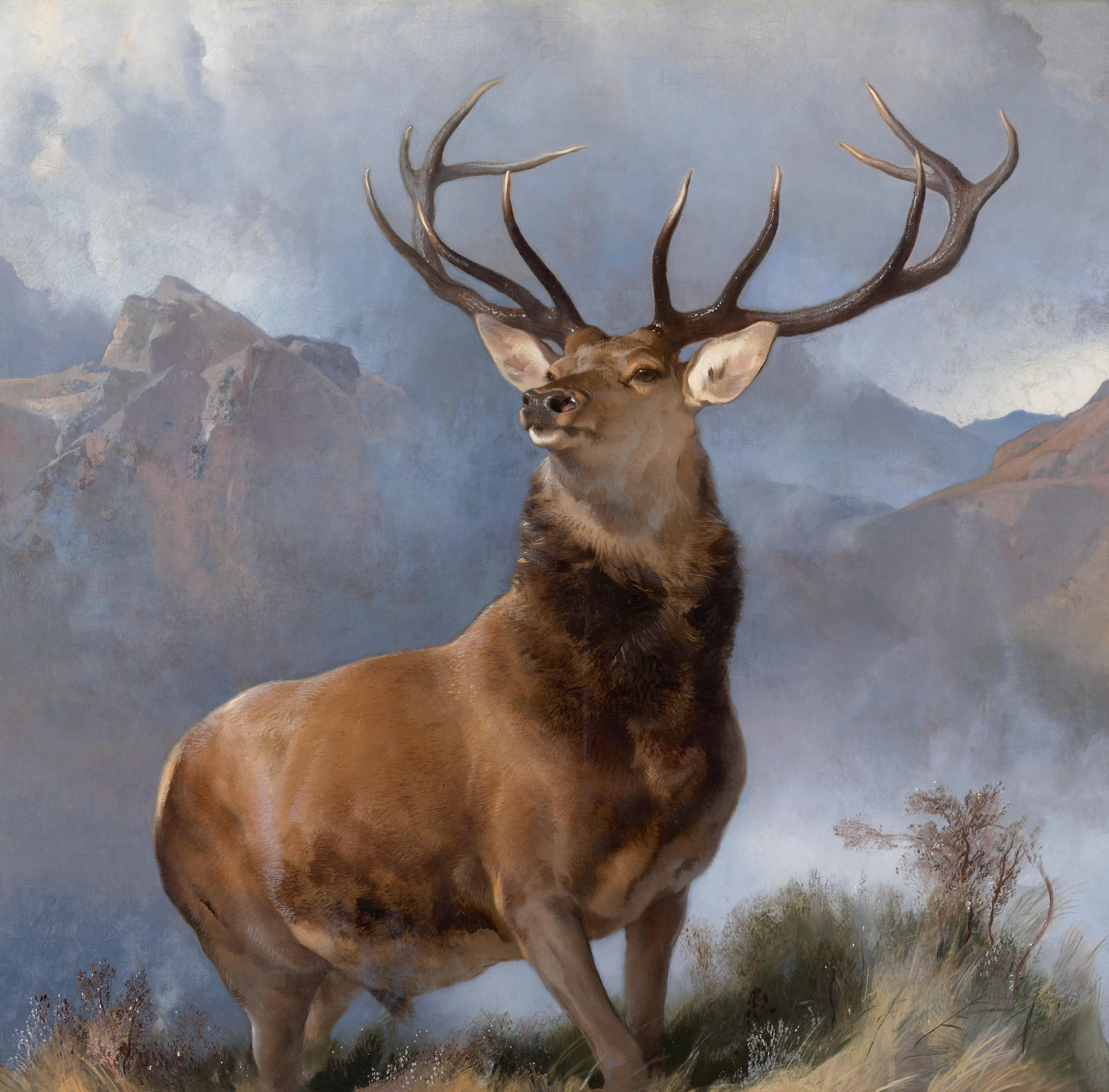
The Monarch of the Glen (1851): the image was widely distributed in steel engravings. Now in the Scottish National Gallery, Edinburgh

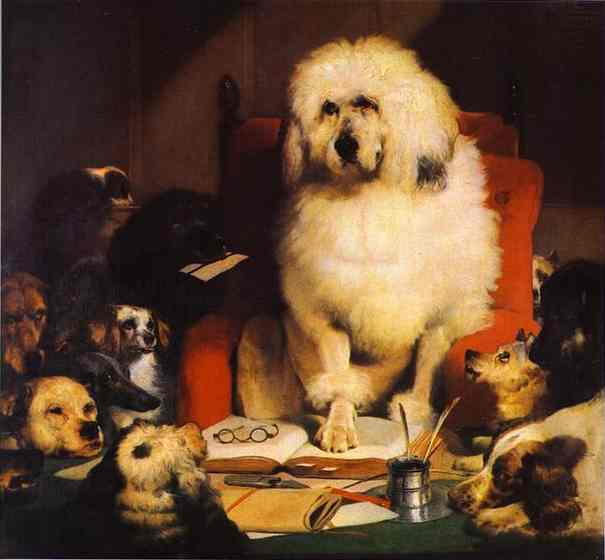
Laying Down the Law (c.1840)

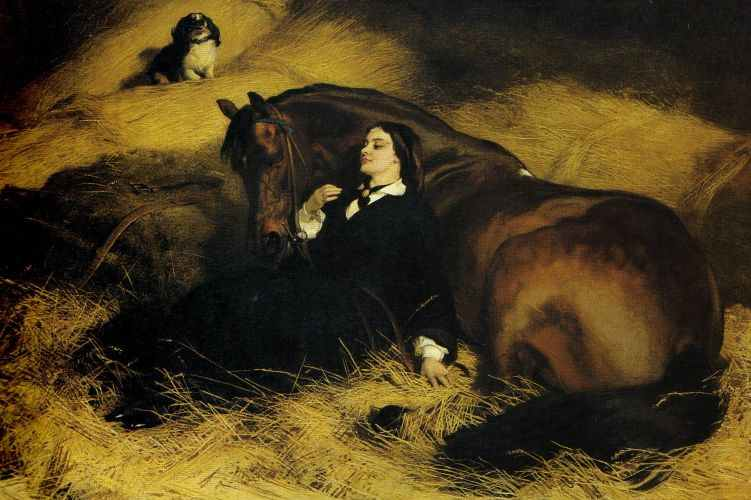
The Shrew Tamed (1861)

== Sculpture ==
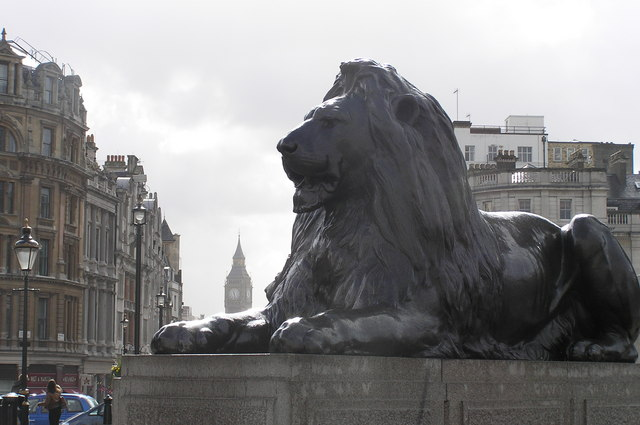
One of four Lions around the base of Nelson's Column (1867)

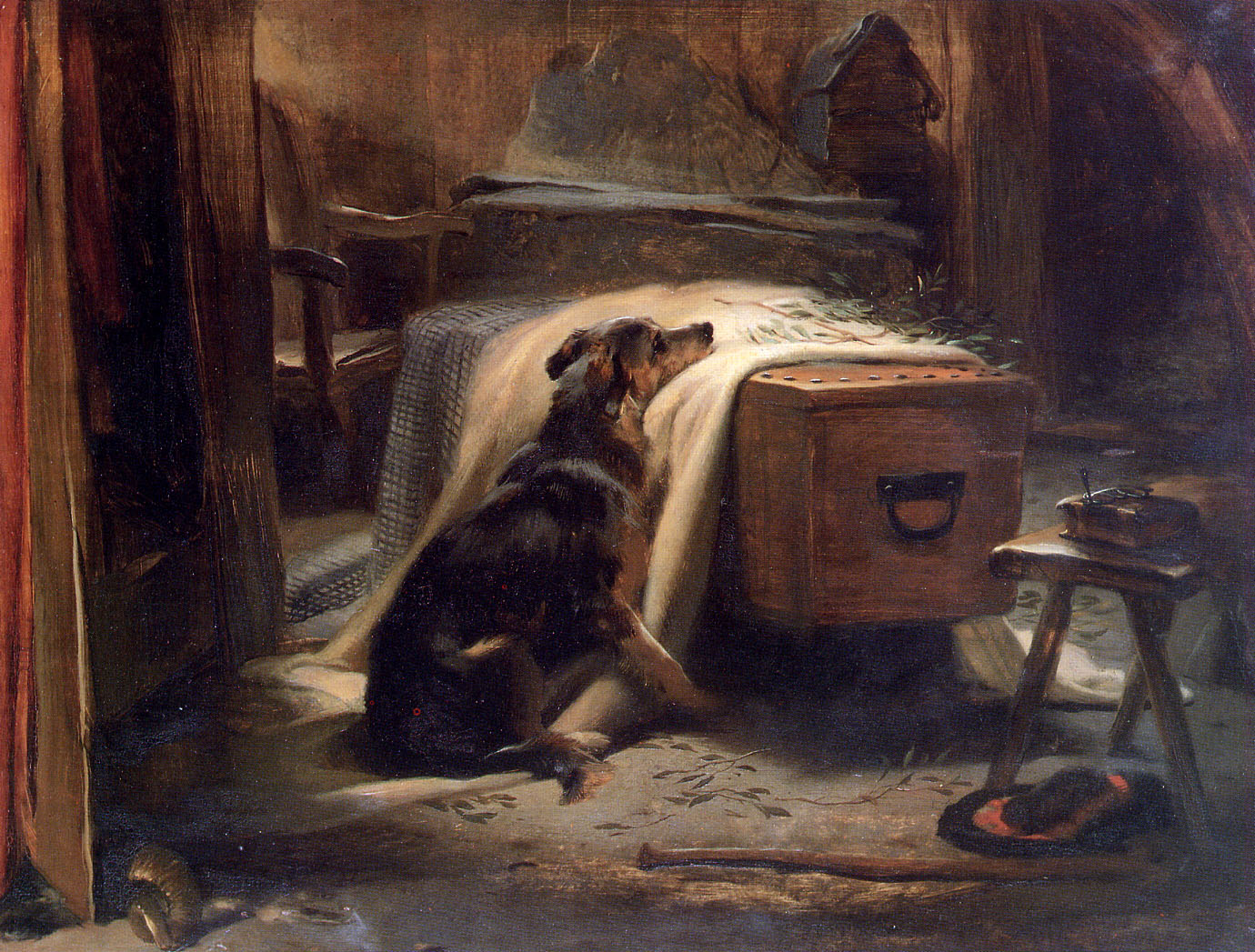
The Old Shepherd's Chief Mourner (1837; Victoria and Albert Museum, London).

In 1858 the government commissioned Landseer to make four gold lions for the base of Nelson's Column in Trafalgar Square, following the rejection of a set in stone by Thomas Milnes. Landseer accepted on condition that he would not have to start work for another nine months, and there was a further delay when he asked to be supplied with copies of casts of a real lion he knew were in the possession of the academy at Turin. The request proved complex, and the casts did not arrive until the summer of 1860. The lions were made at the Kensington studio of Carlo Marochetti, who also cast them. Work was slowed by Landseer's ill health, and his fractious relationship with Marochetti. The sculptures were installed in 1867.

== Death ==
Landseer's death on 1 October 1873 was widely marked in England: shops and houses lowered their blinds, flags flew at half mast, his bronze lions at the base of Nelson's Column were hung with wreaths, and large crowds lined the streets to watch his funeral cortege pass. Landseer was buried in St Paul's Cathedral, London.

At his death, Landseer left behind three unfinished paintings: Finding the Otter, Nell Gwynne, and The Dead Buck, all on easels in his studio. It was his dying wish that his friend John Everett Millais should complete the paintings, and this he did.

In 1876, a 30-foot self-righting lifeboat, built by Woolfe of Shadwell, costing £275, was gifted to the Royal National Lifeboat Institution, and placed at Chapel Lifeboat Station in Lincolnshire. Funded by Miss Jennie Landseer, the lifeboat was named Landseer, in memory of her late brother.

== Miscellaneous ==
Landseer was rumoured to be able to paint with both hands at the same time, for example, paint a horse's head with the right and its tail with the left, simultaneously. He was also known to be able to paint extremely quickly—when the mood struck him. He could also procrastinate, sometimes for years, over certain commissions.

The architect Sir Edwin Landseer Lutyens was named after him and was his godson—Lutyens' father was a friend of Landseer.

== Gallery ==
Paintings

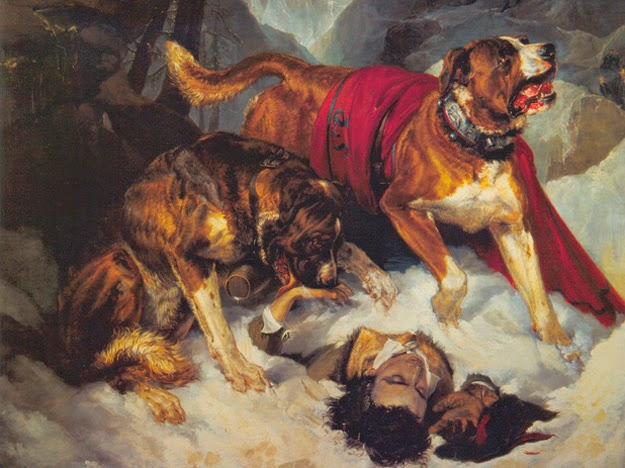
Alpine Mastiffs Reanimating a Distressed Traveller, 1820

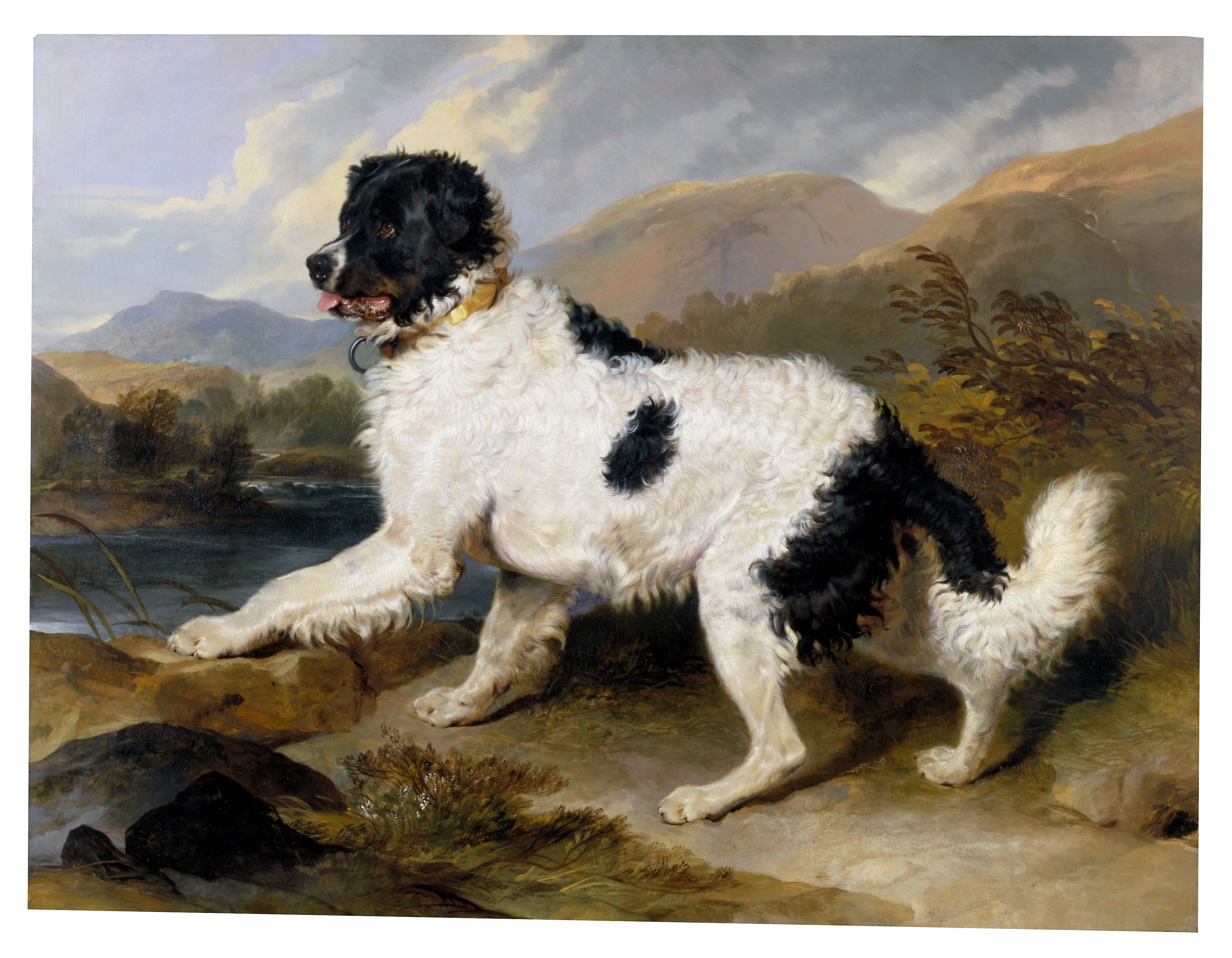
Lion, a Newfoundland Dog, 1824

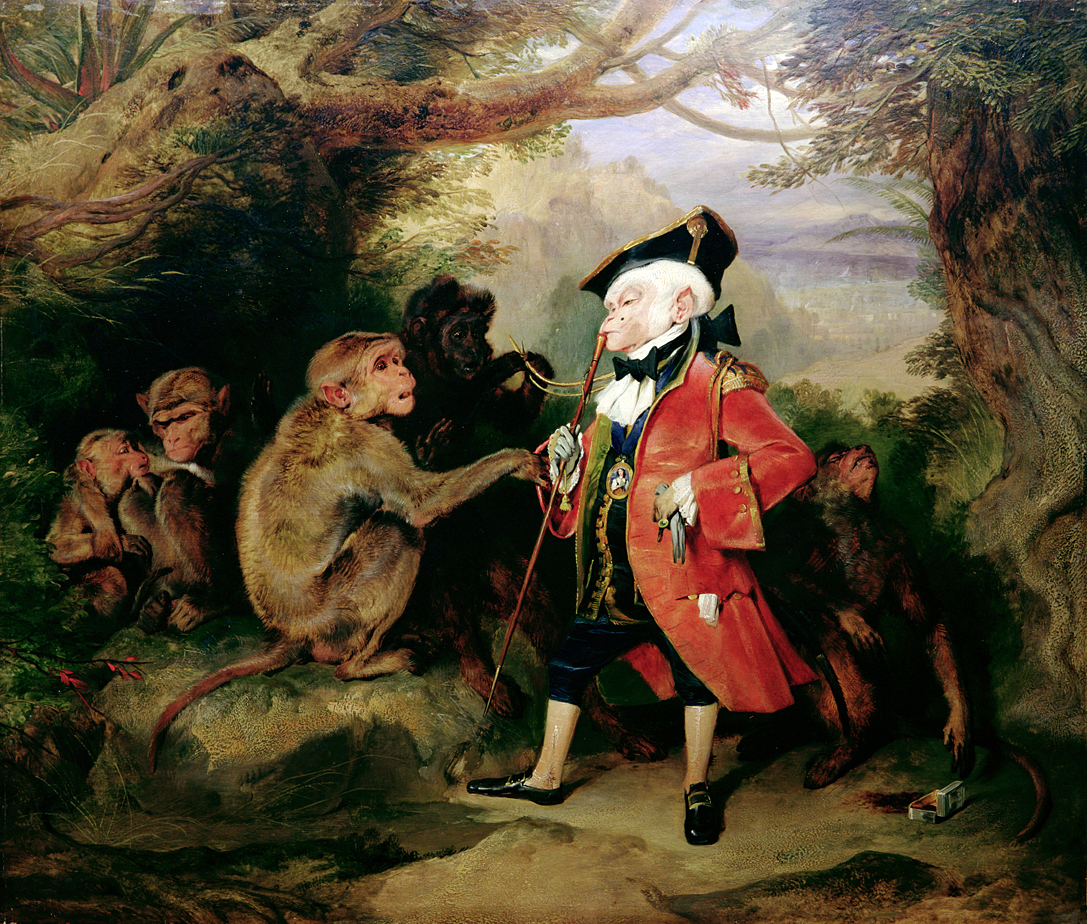
The Monkey Who Had Seen the World, 1827

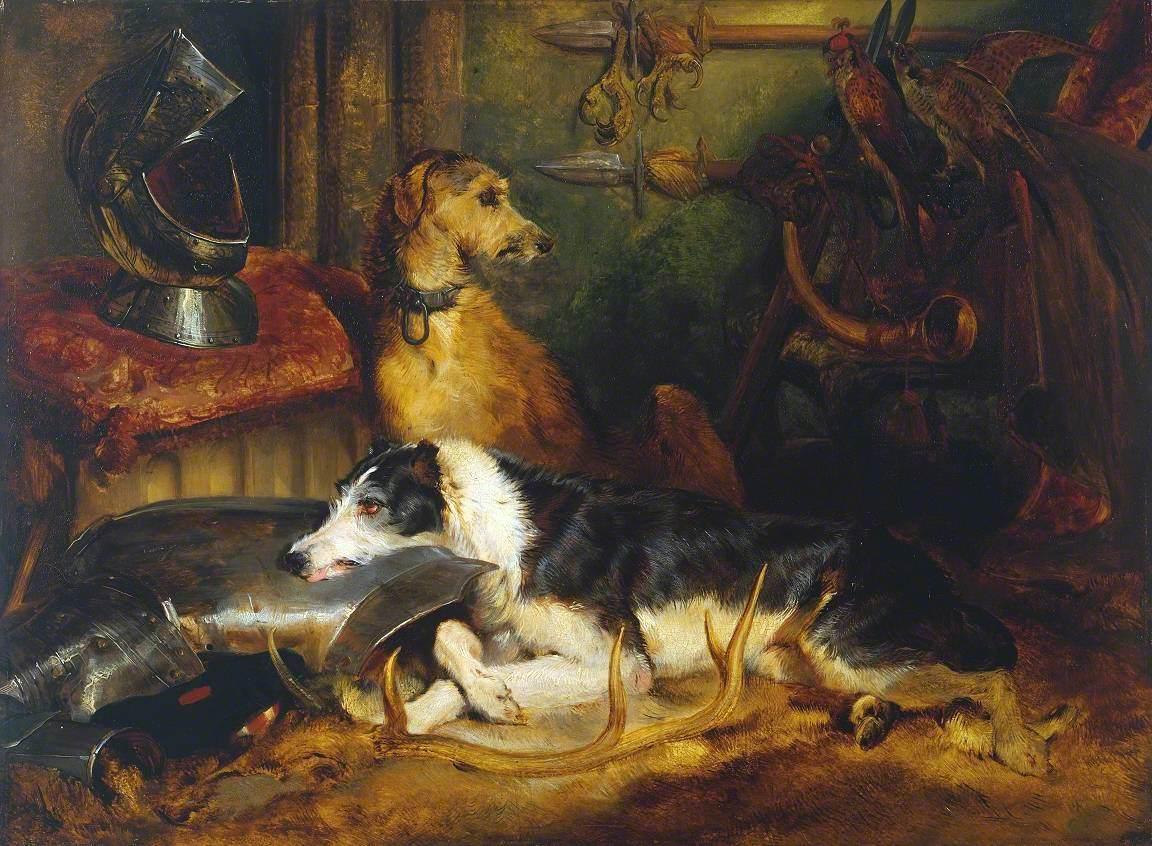
A Scene at Abbotsford, 1827

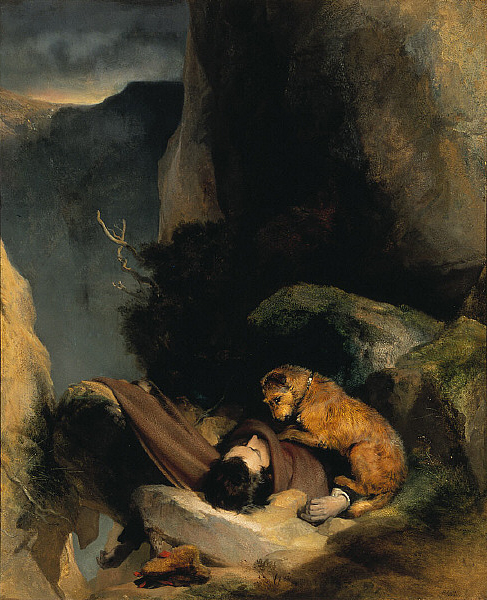
Attachment, 1829

The Illicit Highland Whisky Still, 1829

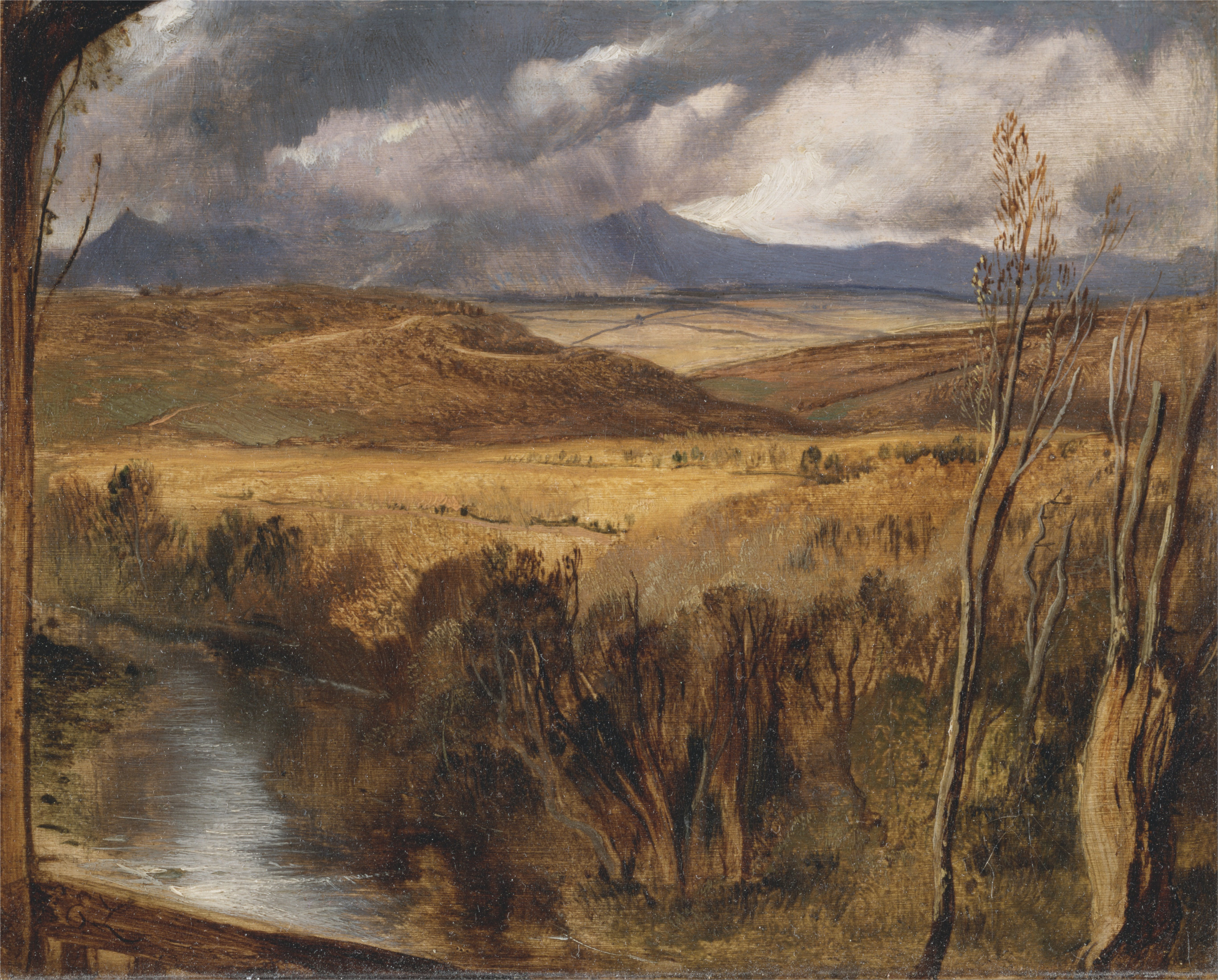
A Highland Landscape, c. 1830

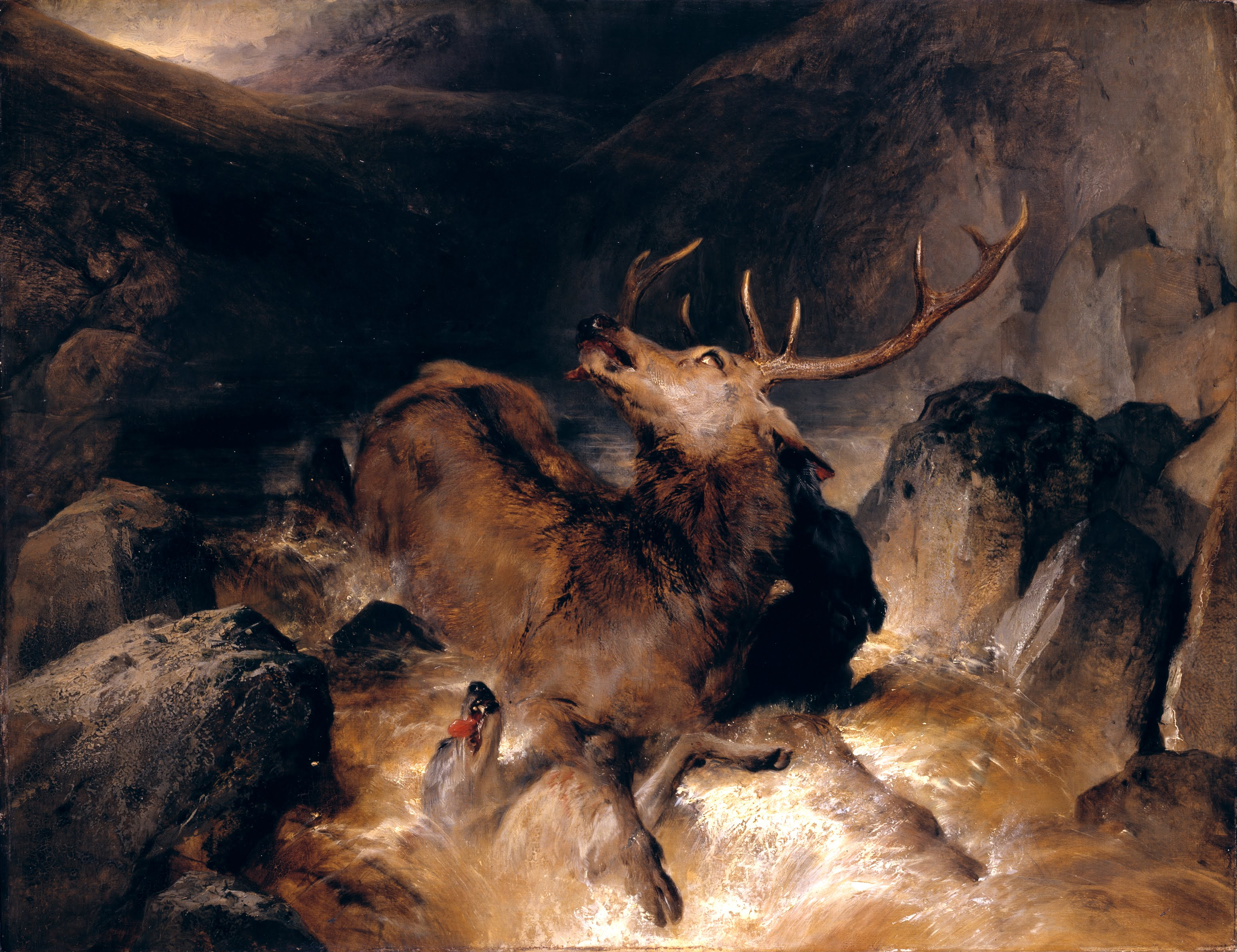
The Hunted Stag, 1833

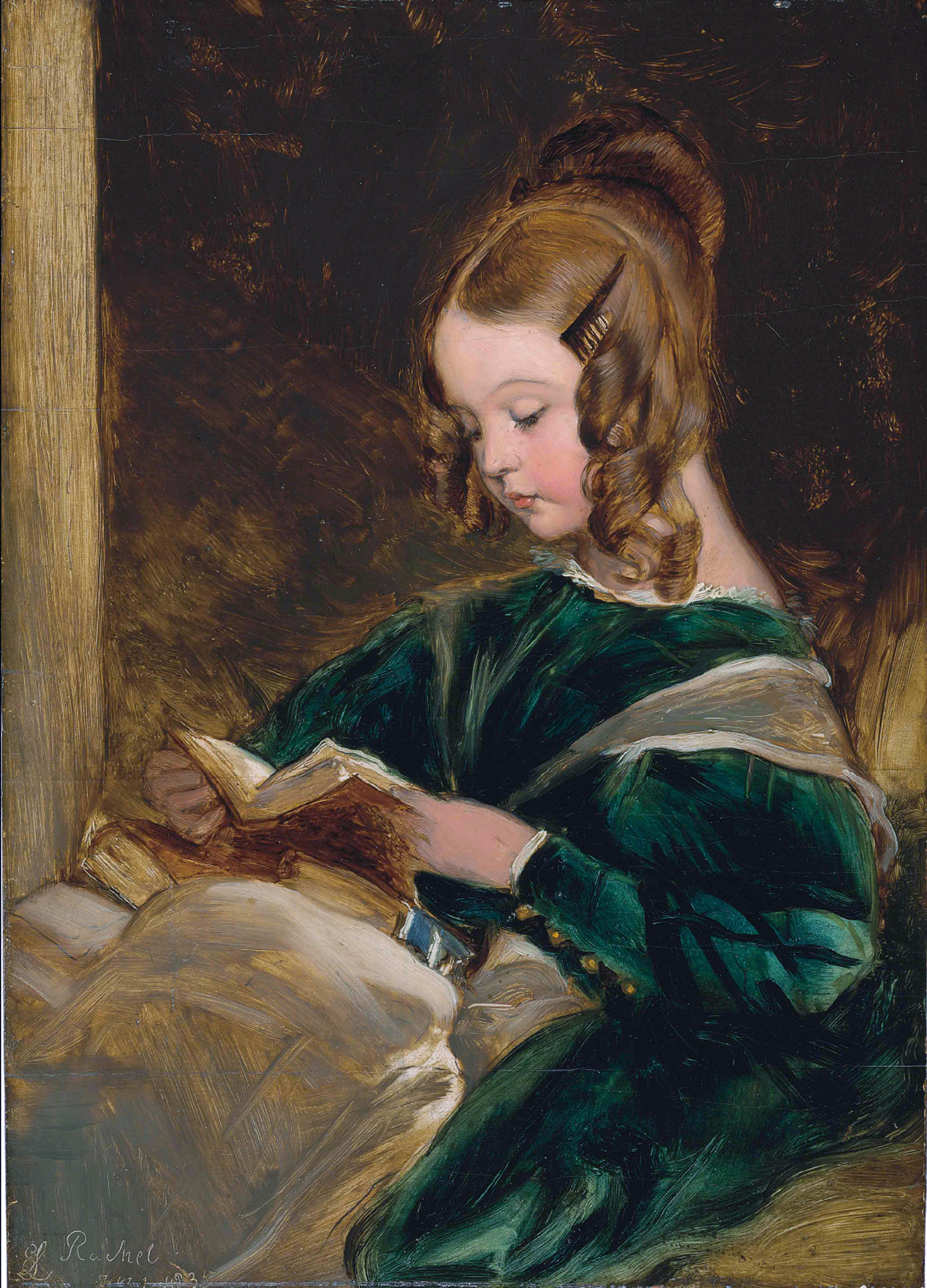
Rachel Russell, 1835

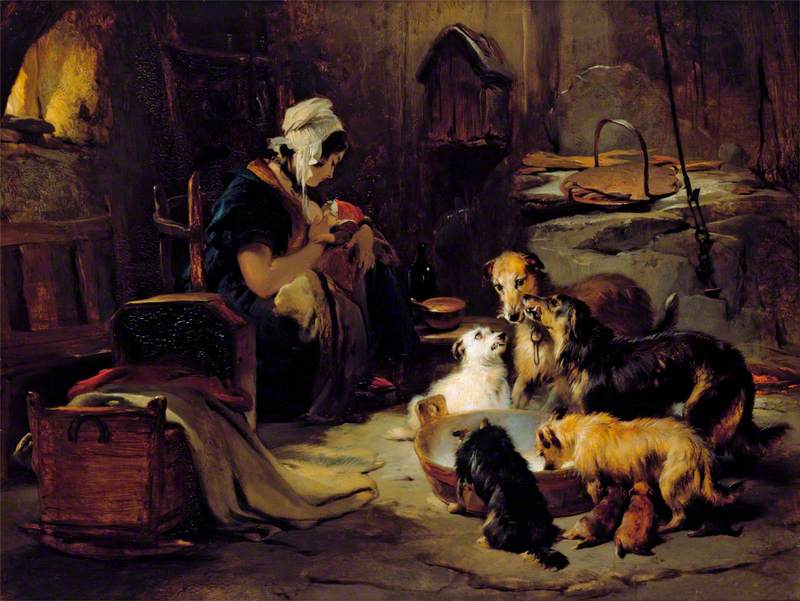
A Highland Breakfast, 1834

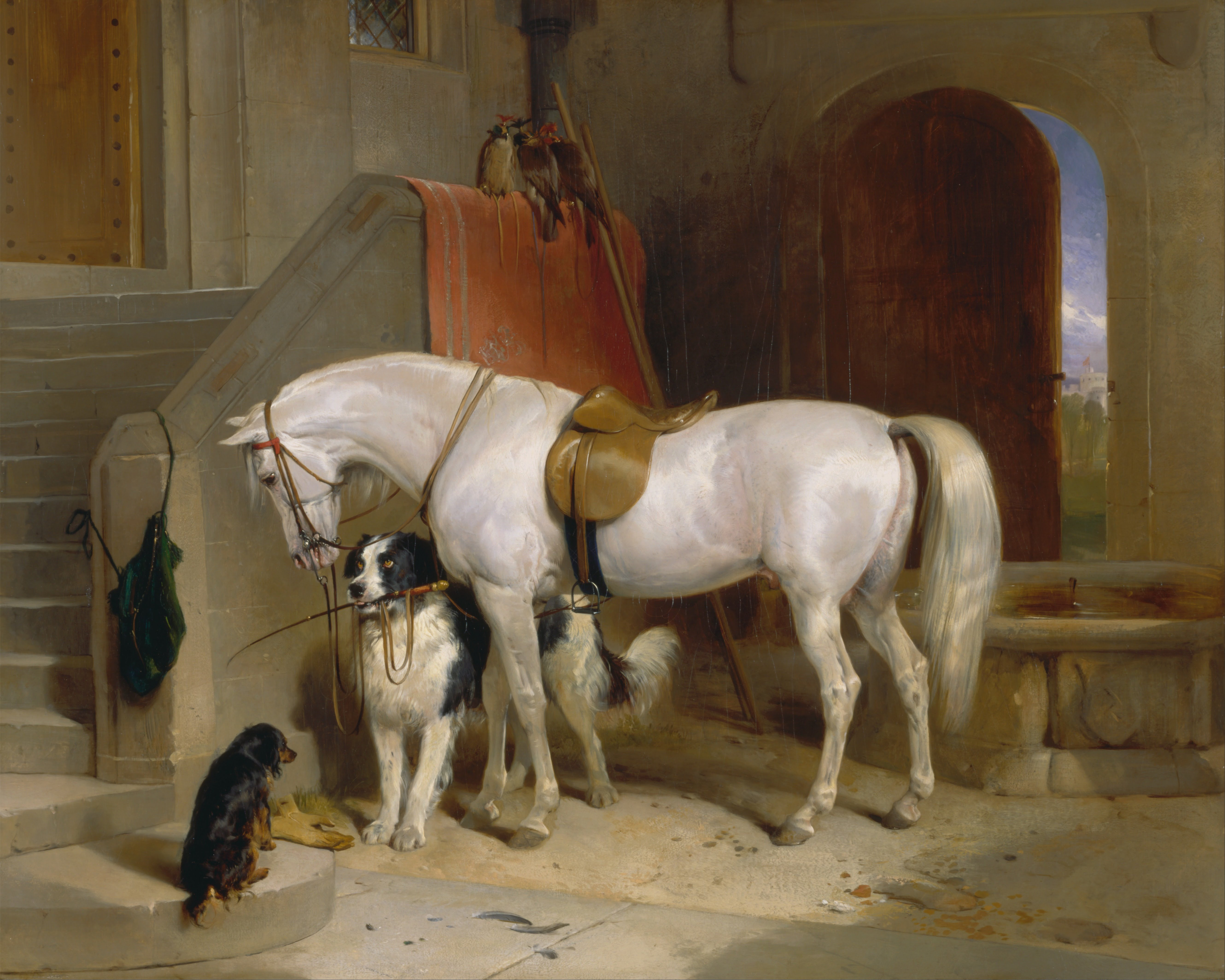
Favourites, the Property of H.R.H. Prince George of Cambridge, 1834 to 1835

A Highland Shepherd's Home, 1836

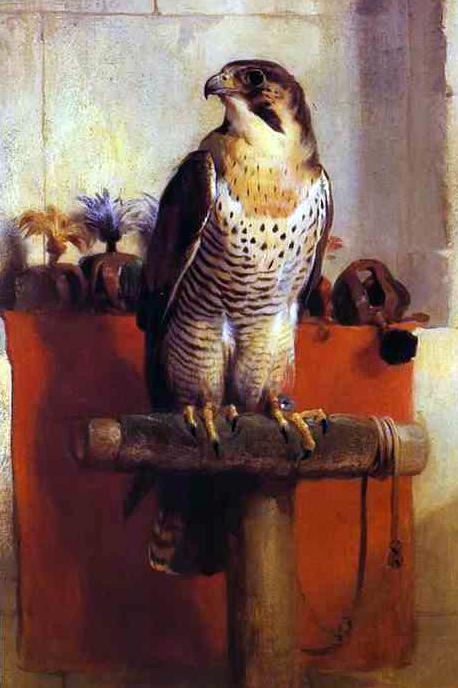
Falcon, 1837

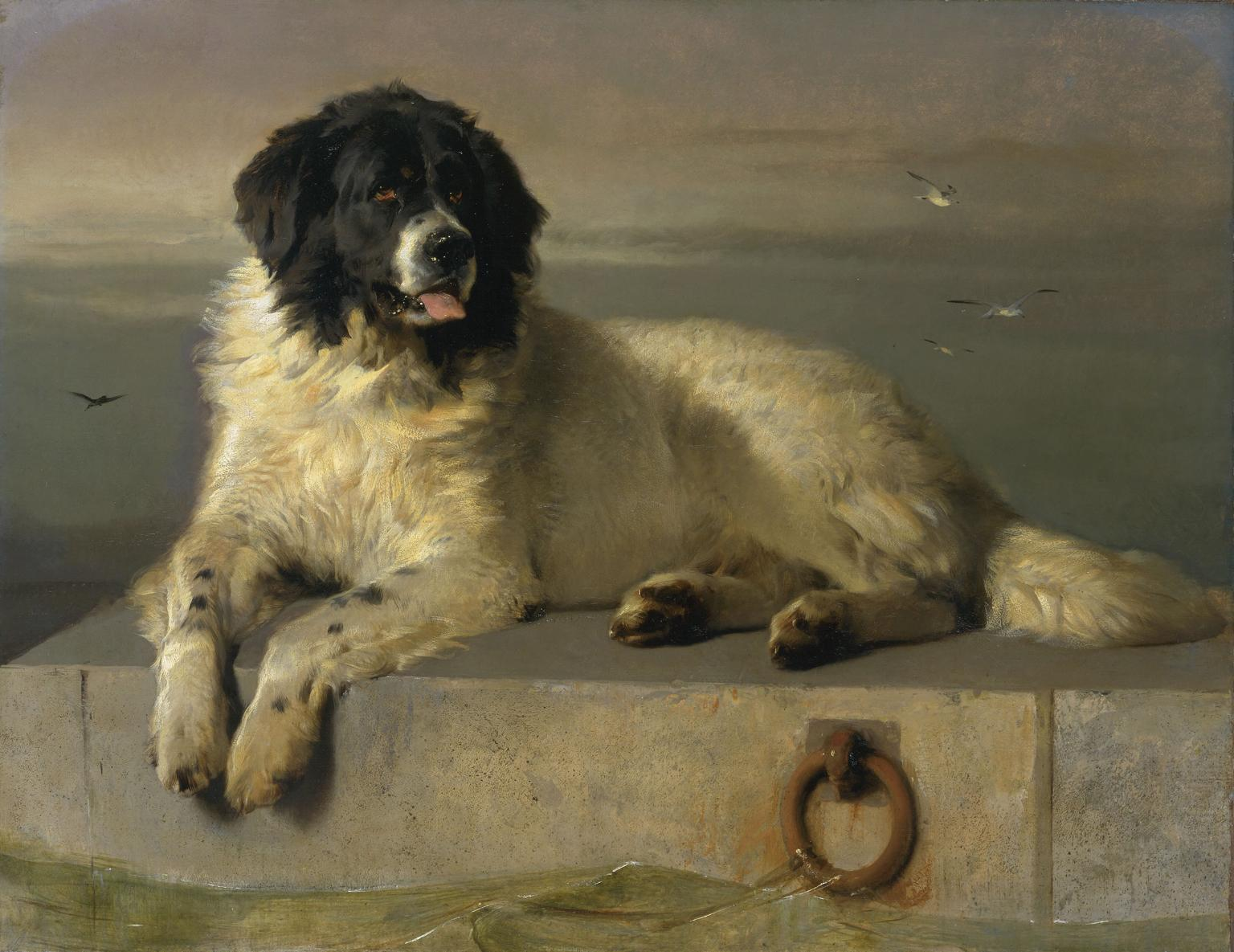
A Distinguished Member of the Humane Society, exhibited 1838

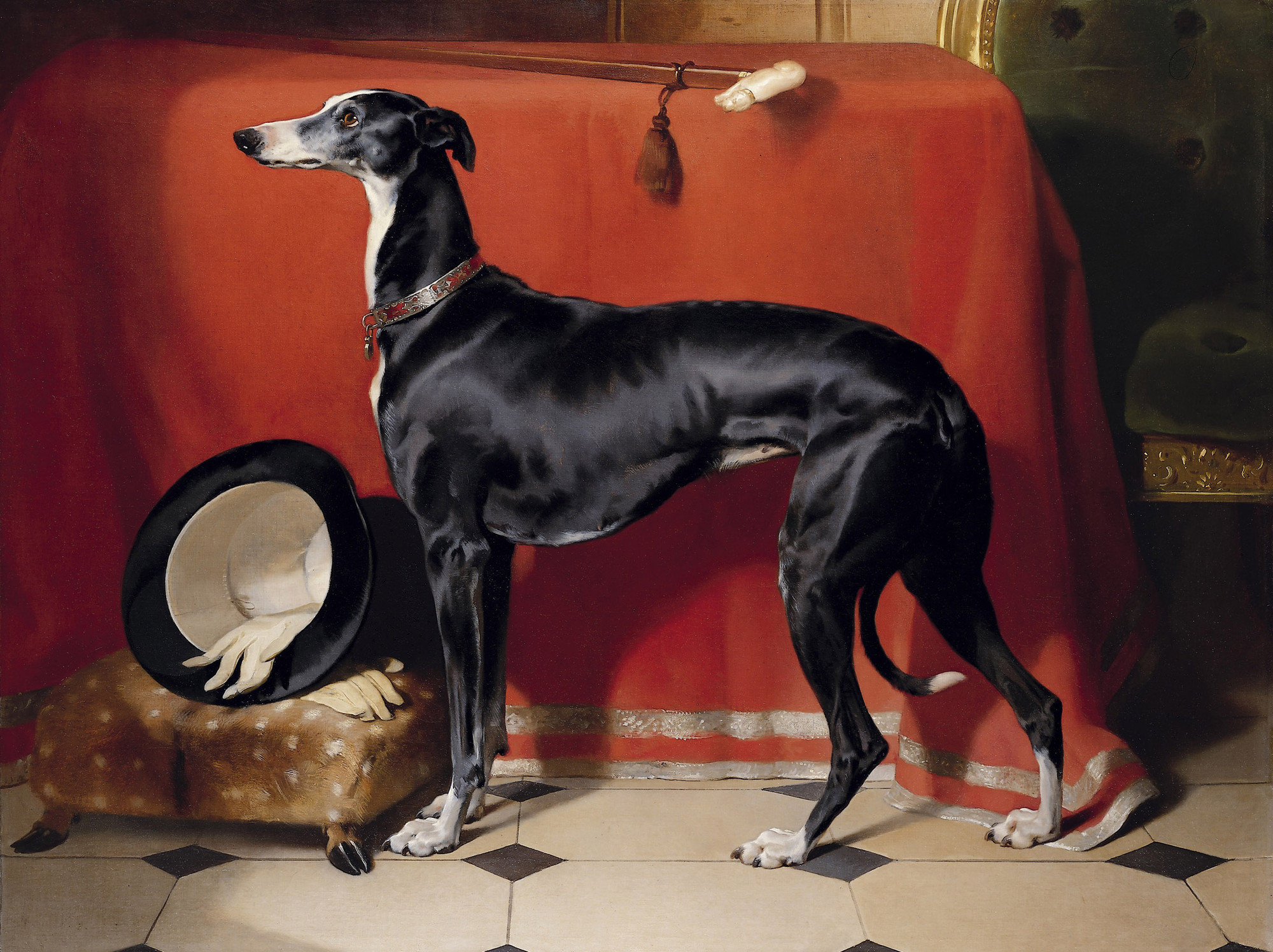
A Favourite Greyhound of Prince Albert, 1841

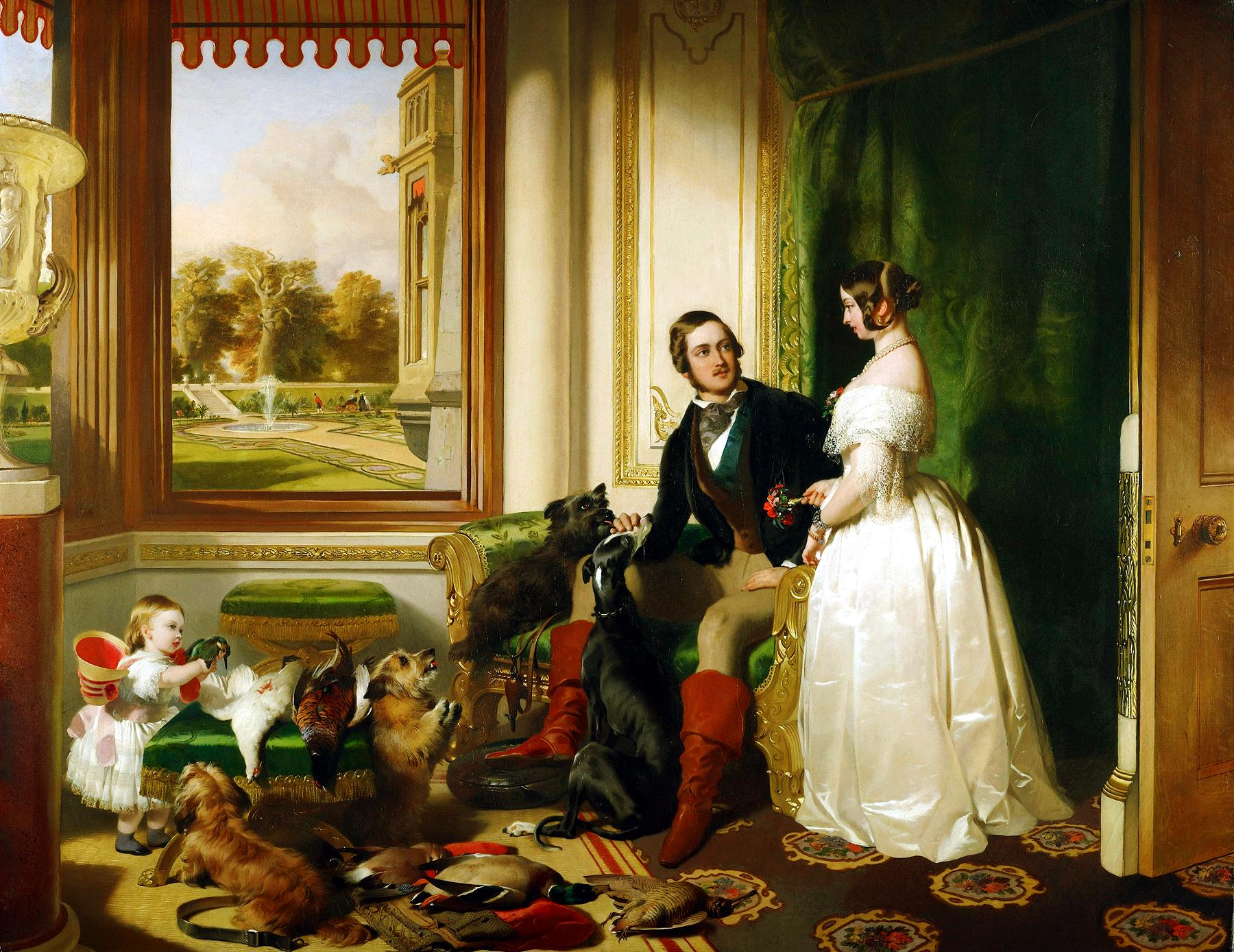
Windsor Castle in Modern Times, Queen Victoria and her family, c. 1842

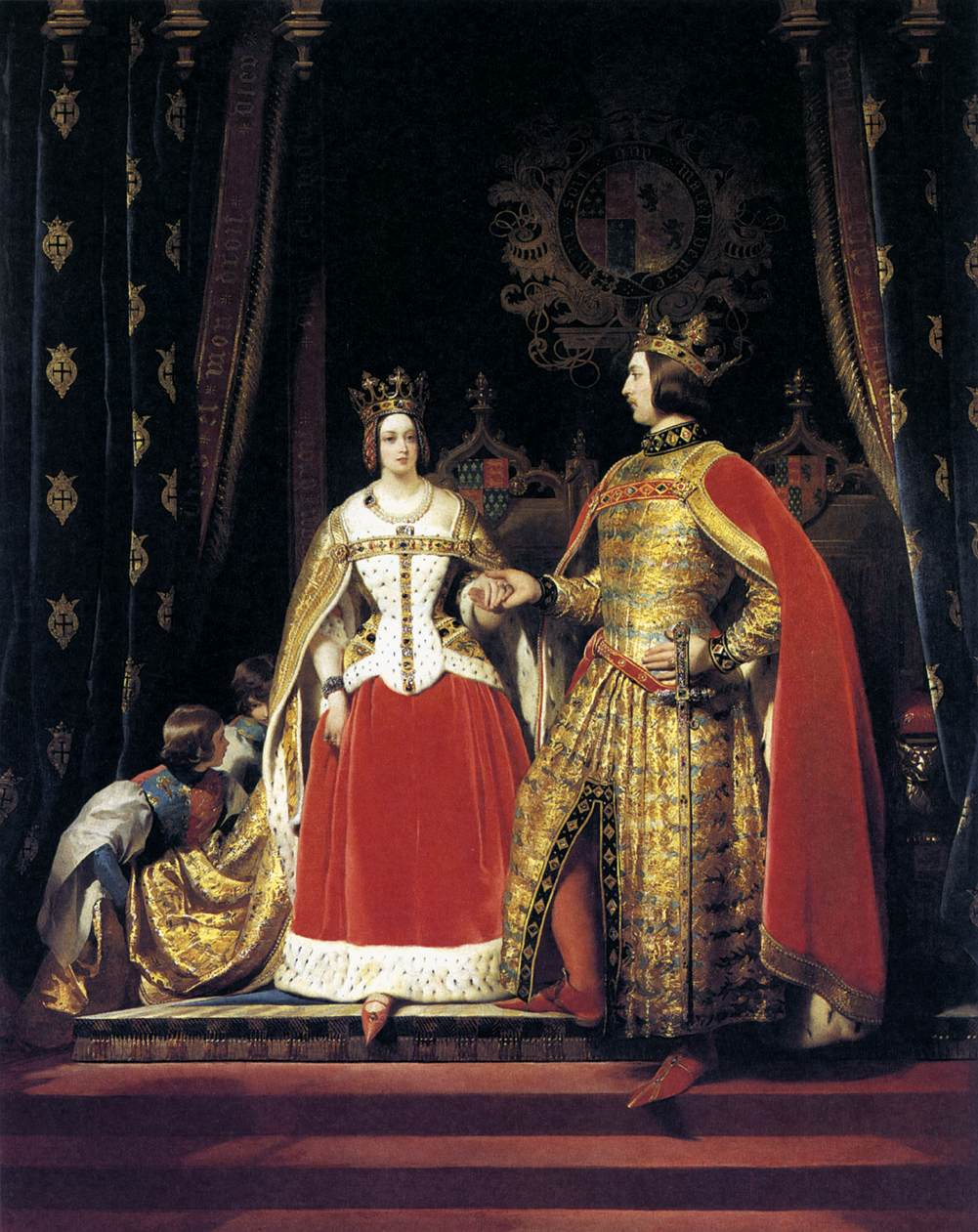
Queen Victoria and Prince Albert at the Bal Costumé of 12 May 1842

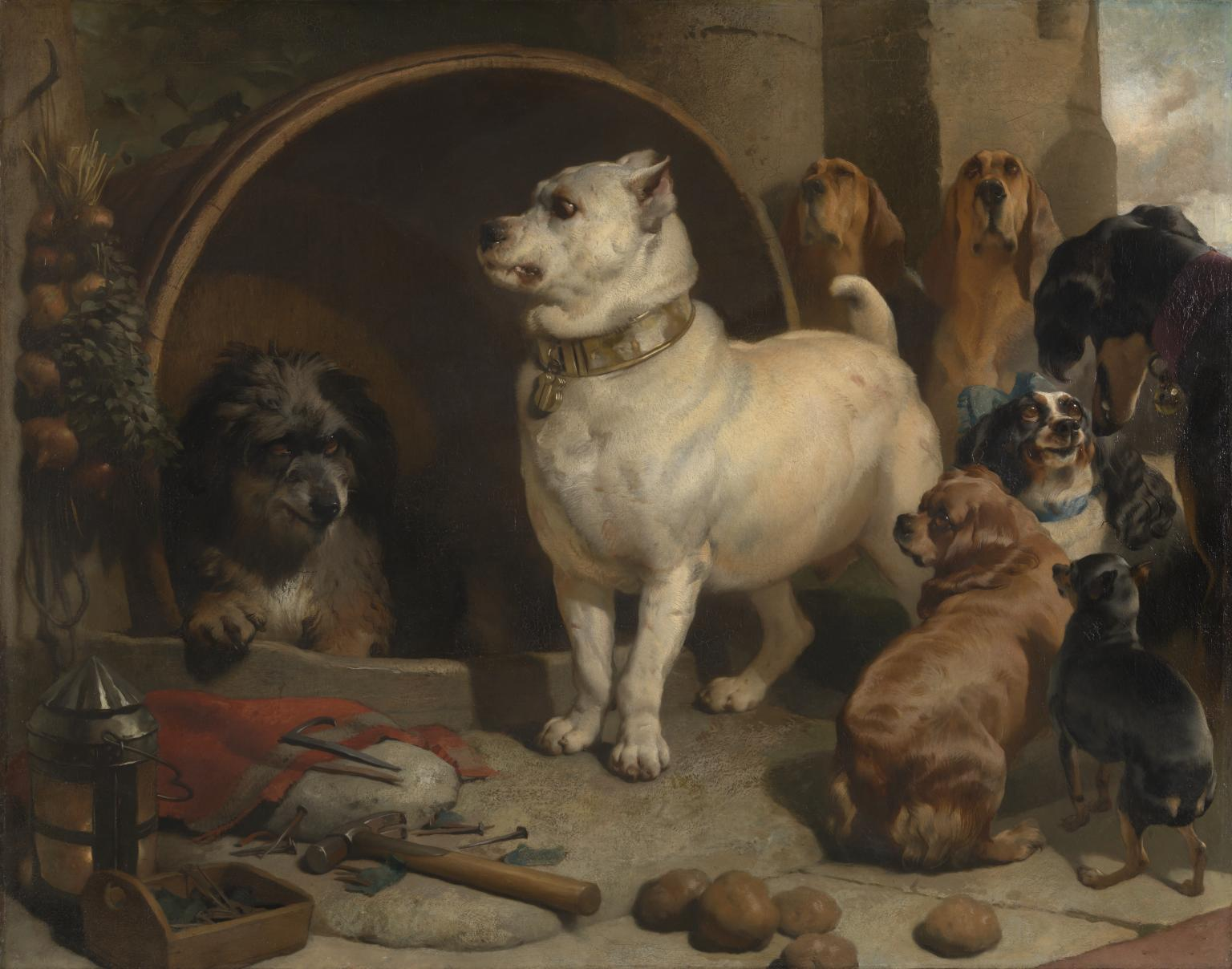
Alexander and Diogenes, exhibited 1848

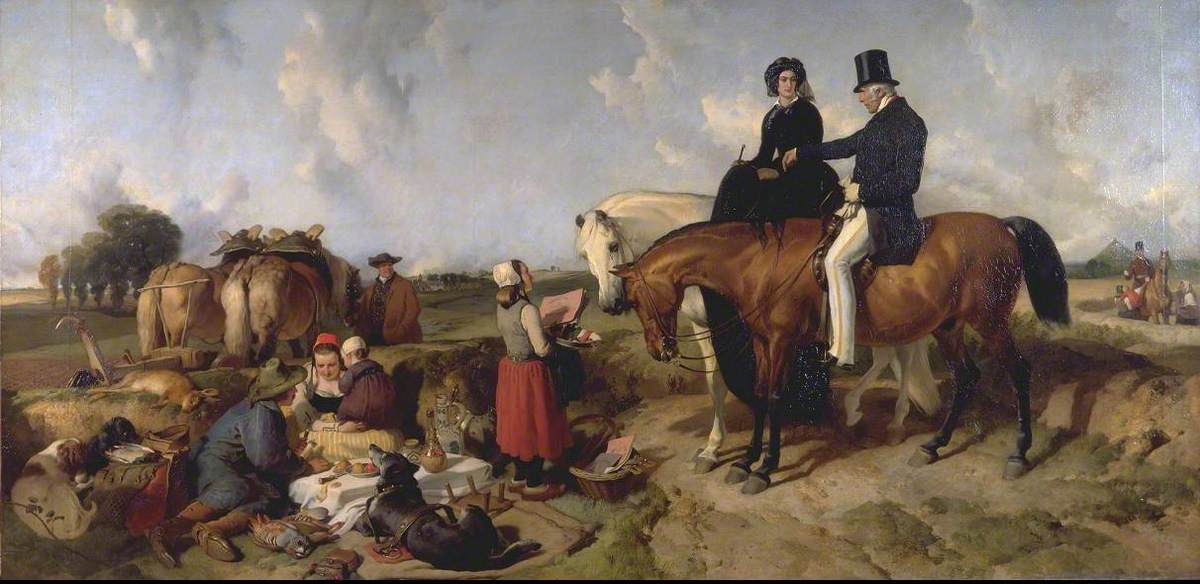
A Dialogue at Waterloo, 1850

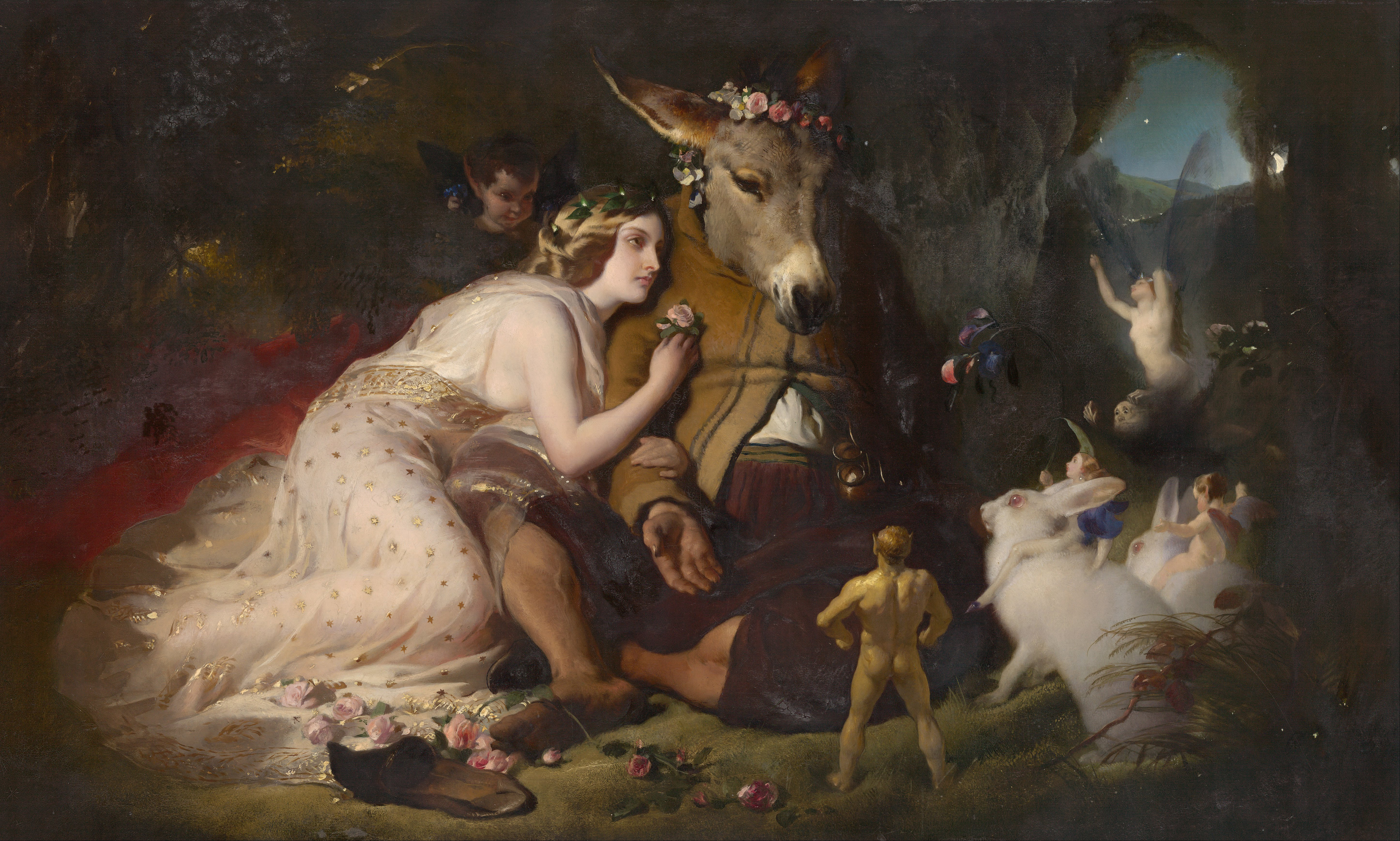
Scene from A Midsummer Night's Dream, c. 1850

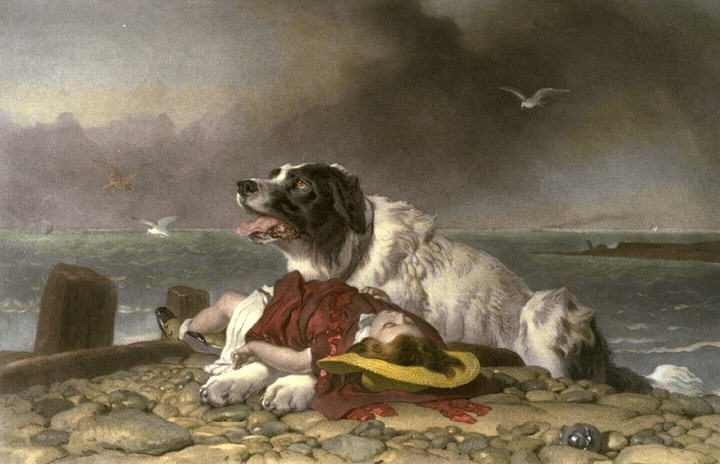
Saved, 1856

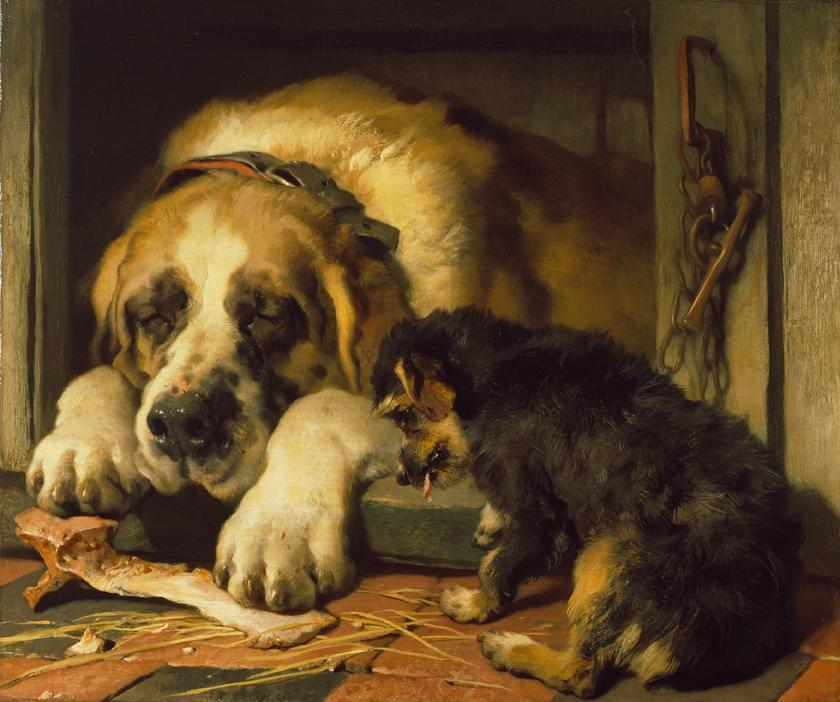
Doubtful Crumbs, 1858

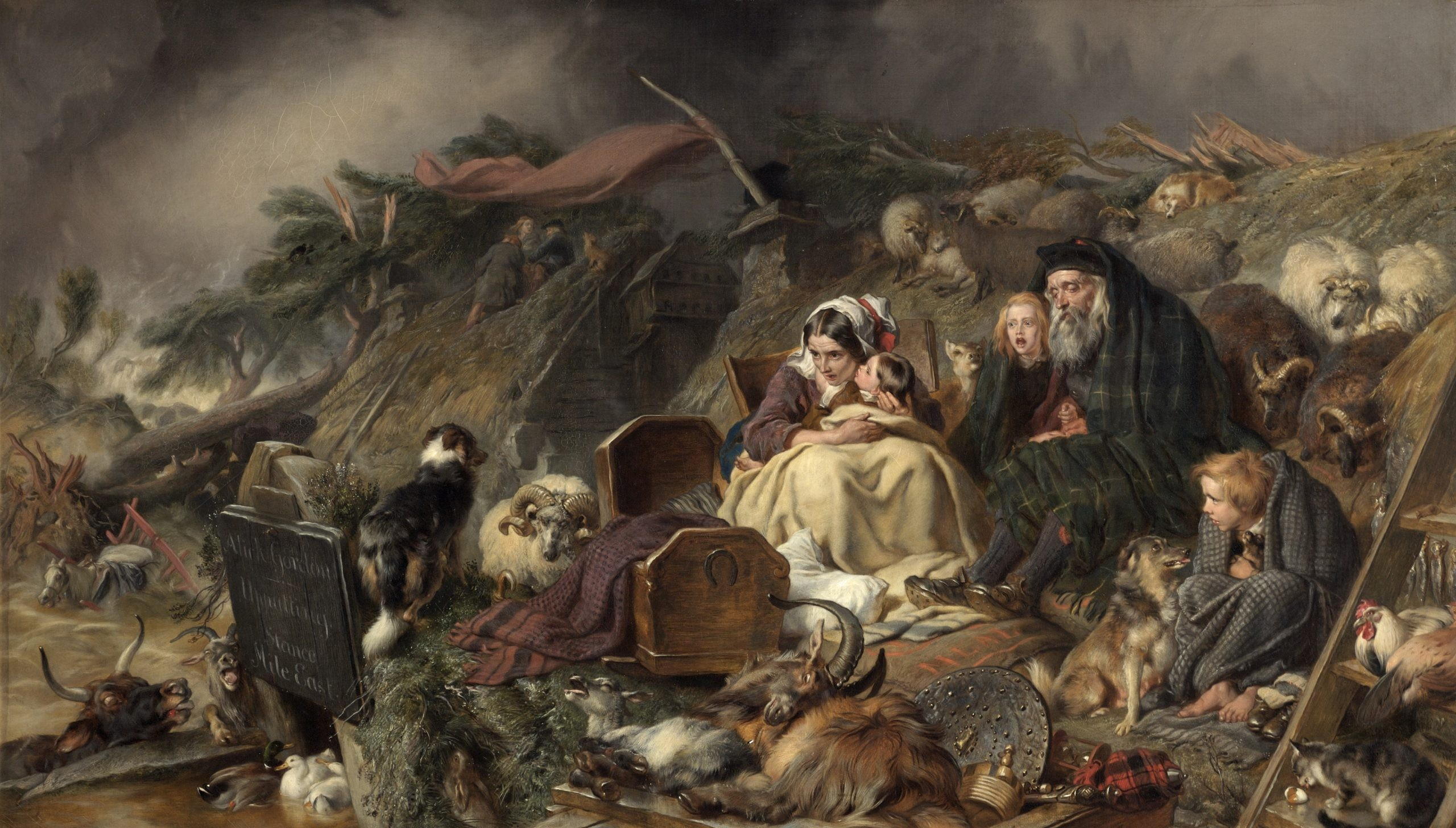
Flood in the Highlands, 1860

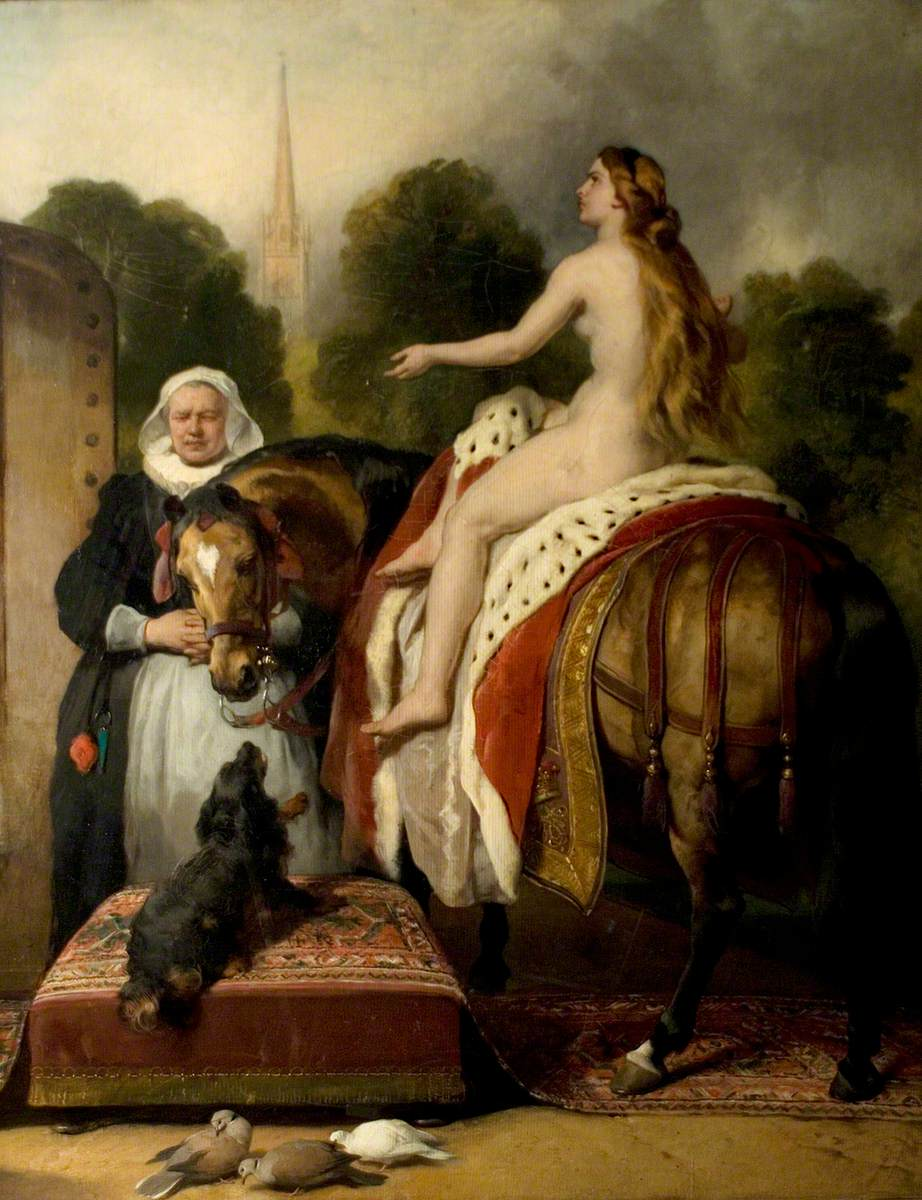
Lady Godiva's Prayer, 1865

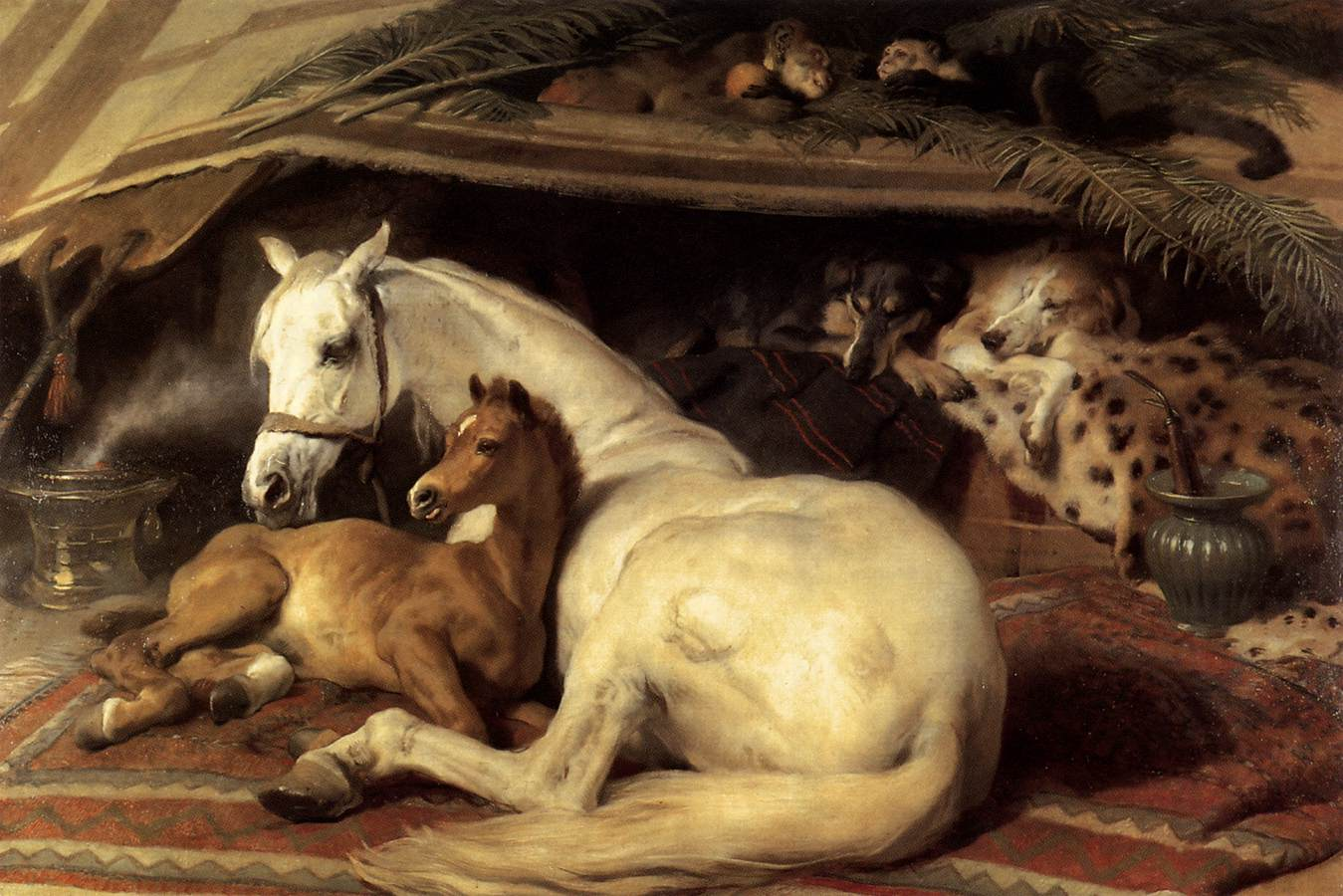
The Arab Tent, 1866

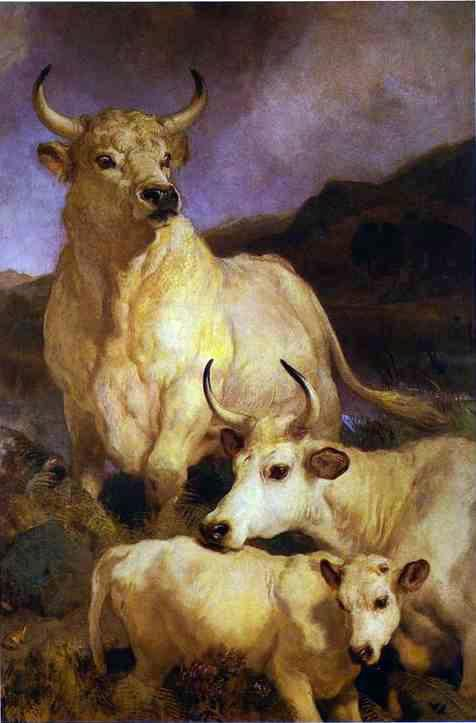
The Wild Cattle of Chillingham, 1867

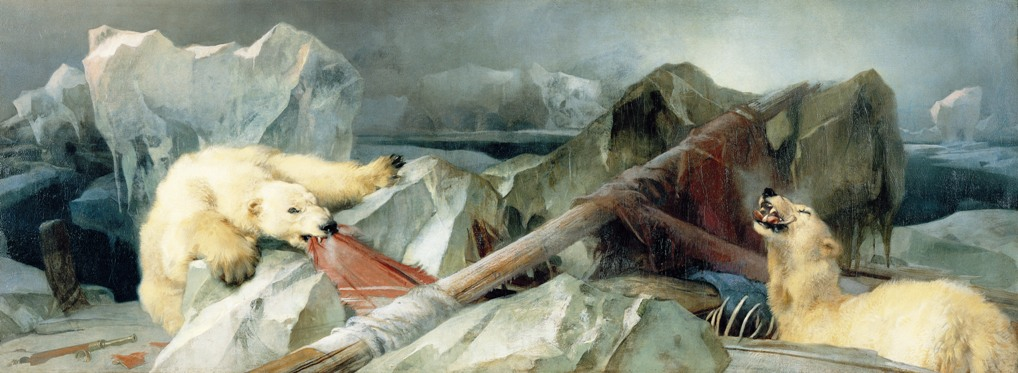
Man Proposes, God Disposes, 1864

== See also ==
- List of wildlife artists
- Lost artworks
