= Laying Down the Law =

1840 painting by Edwin Henry Landseer

Trial by Jury
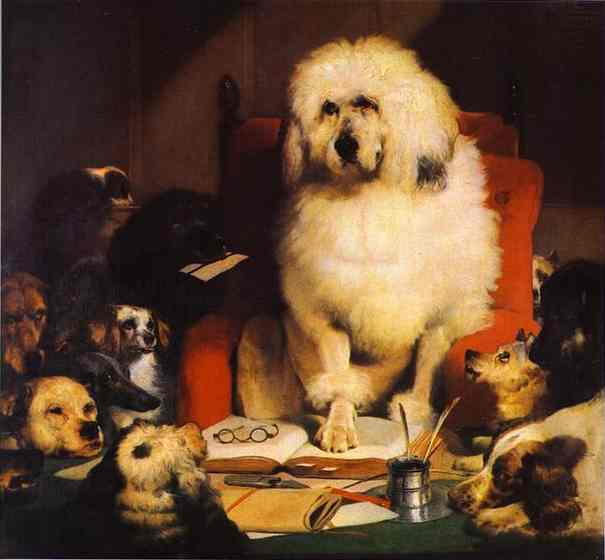
- Artist: Sir Edwin Landseer
- Year: 1840
- Medium: Oil-on-canvas
- Dimensions: 72 cm × 95 cm (28 in × 37 in)
- Location: Chatsworth House, Bakewell

Trial by Jury, or Laying Down the Law as it is commonly known, is an oil-on-canvas painting from 1840 by the English painter Sir Edwin Landseer, which satirises the legal profession. It depicts dogs in the roles of members of the court with a French poodle centre stage as the judge. The painting was inspired by a chance comment by a judge, while at dinner with Landseer, that the French poodle belonging to amateur artist and renowned socialite, the Count d'Orsay, "would make a capital Lord Chancellor".

Landseer was a member of the Royal Academy and had become famous for his paintings and drawings of animals. His later works include The Monarch of the Glen, an iconic and much-reproduced painting of a stag in the Highlands, and the sculptures of the lions at the foot of Nelson's Column in Trafalgar Square, London.

He completed Trial by Jury in 1840—it was exhibited at the Royal Academy in the same year and was acquired by William Cavendish, 6th Duke of Devonshire, who had Landseer add his Blenheim spaniel, Bony, into the scene behind the greyhound. Early copies of the painting can be seen with Bony absent. The original now hangs in the Sculpture Gallery at Chatsworth House. The poodle has been variously identified as representing Lord Brougham, who had been Lord Chancellor from 1830 to 1834, or Lord Lyndhurst, who had held the post three times (1827–1830, 1834–1835, and 1841–1846).

== See also ==
- Dogs Playing Poker
