= Isambard Kingdom Brunel Standing Before the Launching Chains of the Great Eastern =

1857 photograph

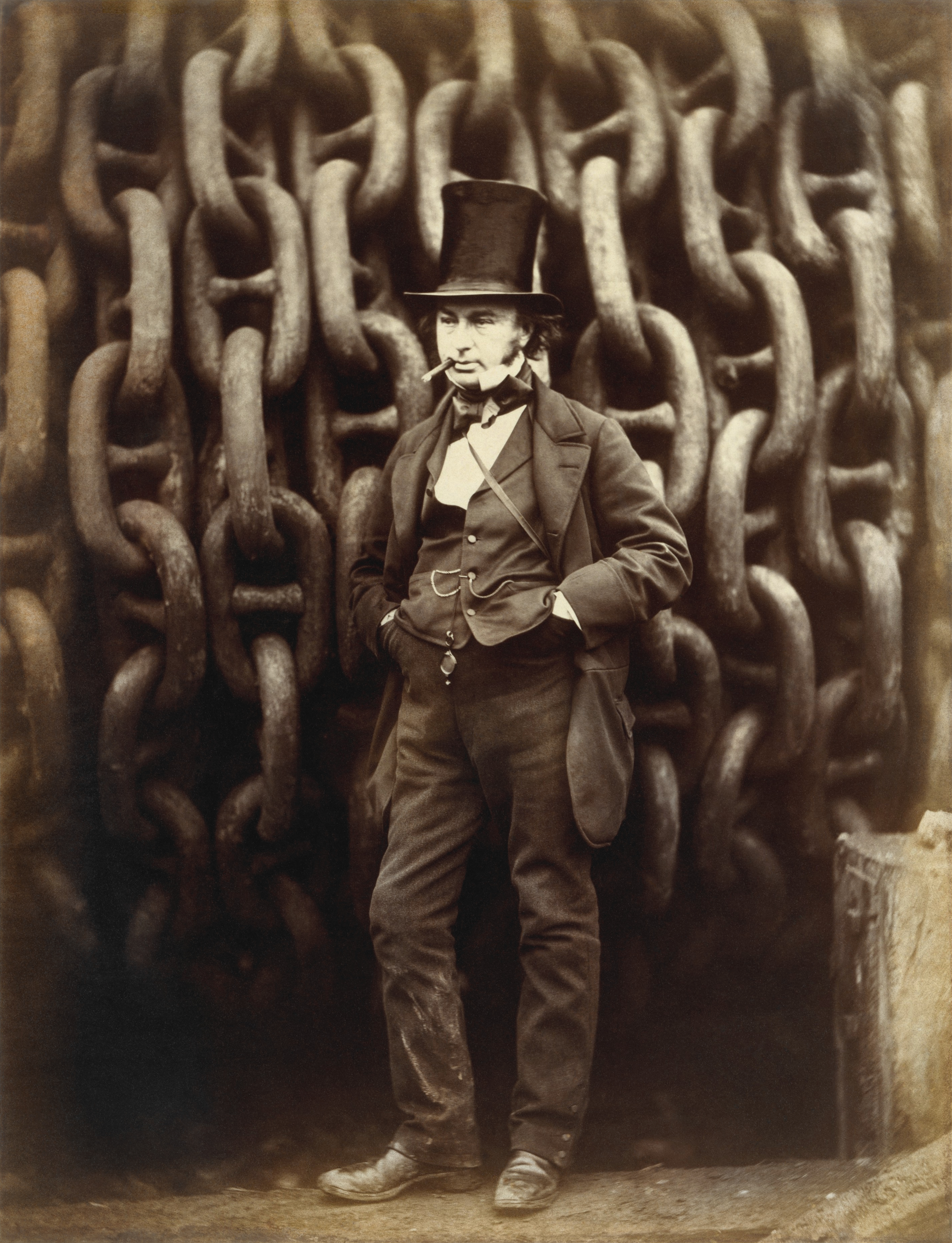
Isambard Kingdom Brunel Standing Before the Launching Chains of the Great Eastern by Robert Howlett, 1857

Isambard Kingdom Brunel Standing Before the Launching Chains of the Great Eastern is a photograph taken by Robert Howlett in November 1857. It shows Brunel, the British engineer, during the troubled first attempt to launch the SS Great Eastern, by far the largest ship constructed to that date. Brunel stands before a drum of chain used during the vessel's launch while smoking a cigar. He carries his customary cigar case, his boots and trousers are muddy, and his waistcoat is askew. His pose has been described as casual and self-assured.

Howlett's image has become iconic of the industrial era and the 19th century, and has been included in many published collections of photographs. It was widely reproduced at the time of the ship's launch in January 1858 and again after Brunel died in 1859.

== Background ==
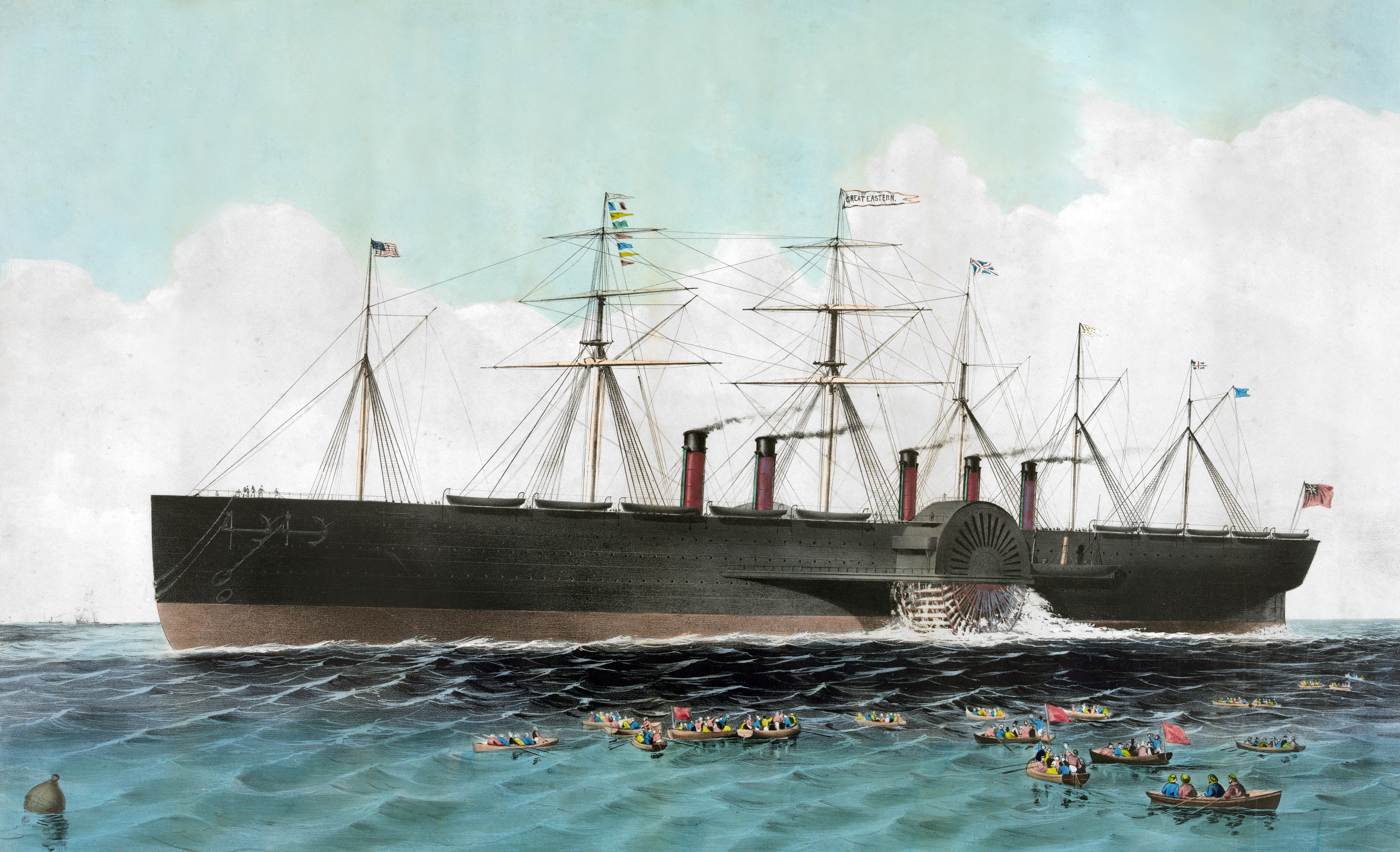
A depiction of the Great Eastern at sea

Isambard Kingdom Brunel was a British engineer who constructed several innovative civil and railway engineering projects and, in 1845, the SS Great Britain, at that time the largest ship ever built. In 1853 he began construction of the SS Great Eastern, six times the tonnage of any vessel built before and a statement of Britain's maritime supremacy. The project was one of Brunel's last and most challenging. With the vessel measuring 692 feet (211 m) in length and 22,500 long tons (22,900 t) in weight, it proved difficult to launch. Beginning in November 1857, it took three months to launch, sideways down an inclined timber ramp.

Great Eastern was intended for the Far East passenger trade, but traffic on those routes was not sufficient, and it was instead put to use in the Atlantic. It failed to be competitive and was a commercial failure in this role. Great Eastern proved ideal as a cable laying vessel and was used in that role until its scrapping in 1890. It remained unsurpassed in tonnage until the construction of RMS Celtic in 1901.

== Photograph ==
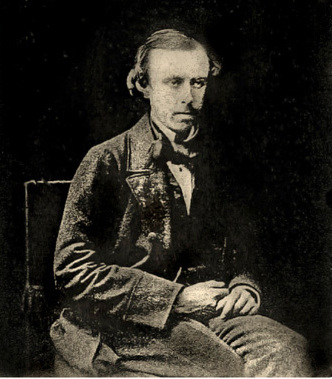
Robert Howlett

The Illustrated Times wanted wood-engravings of the ship to accompany an article on its launch. Robert Howlett was commissioned to visit the shipyard and take suitable photographs for use in producing the engravings. Howlett was a partner at the London photography studio The Photographic Institution and had been taking photographs since 1852. He joined the studio in 1853 and had previously carried out a commission for Queen Victoria and Prince Albert to take portraits of Crimean War soldiers.

Howlett attended the shipbuilding site in Millwall, London, during the first launching attempt, attended by a crowd of 10,000 spectators, in November 1857. In addition to a series of photographs taken of the ship, he took six of Brunel, three portraits of him alone, and three of him among a group of other men. In his photographs Howlett, one of the first to photograph men in the workplace, purposely chose his shots to emphasise the size of the vessel. The photographs were taken on a box camera using the wet plate collodion technique, which allowed for greater detail and reduced exposure times. The process required that the plate be developed immediately, so Howlett would have had to rush them to a darkroom on site, potentially a tent that he is known to have designed for the purpose.

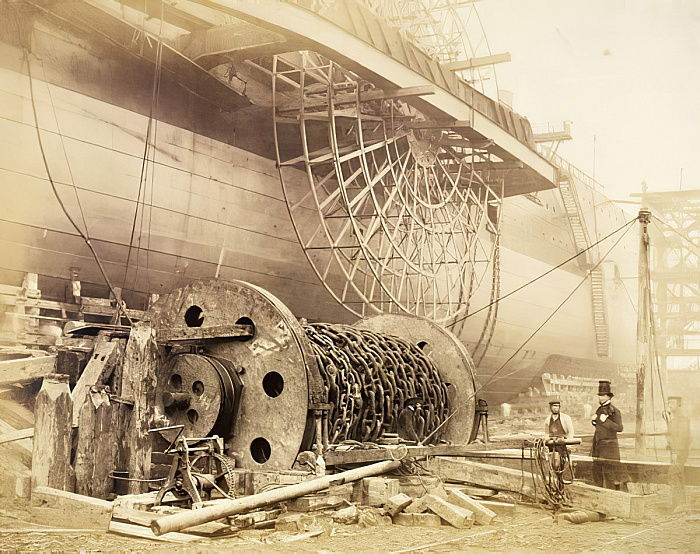
Brunel standing near a chain drum with the Great Eastern in the background

One of the group photographs, which also shows three manual workers, has Brunel standing near one of the checking drums, which held long lengths of large chain used to restrain the ship as it was lowered down the ramp. This photograph has been referred to with the title The Great Eastern (wheel and chain drum) and a copy is in the collection of the Victoria and Albert Museum. The three individual photographs of Brunel all show him standing in front of a checking drum.

His most famous of the individual photographs became known as Isambard Kingdom Brunel Standing Before the Launching Chains of the Great Eastern. In this photograph, Brunel stands casually, smoking a cigar and looking out of shot, his hands in his trouser pockets. His trousers and boots are muddy, and his waistcoat is askew. Brunel wears his cigar case slung across his shoulder, as was his practice when out in public. Having taken other photographs from an oblique angle, Howlett moved his camera to a position directly in front of the drum.

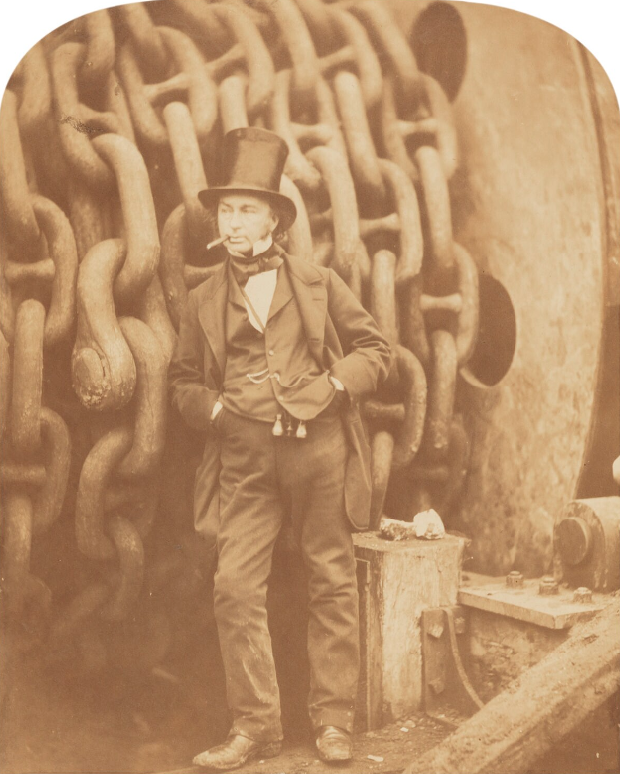
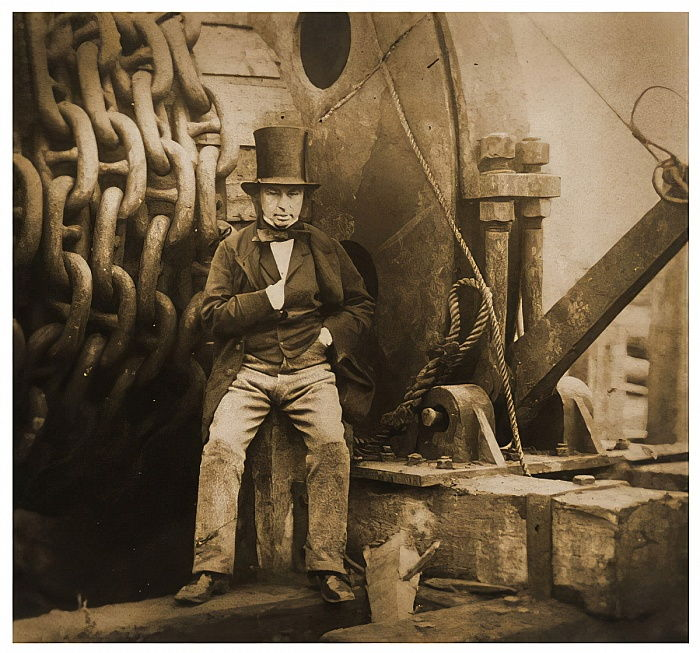
The other two individual portraits of Brunel, taken by Howlett; only one of each image from the stereogram is shown

In another of the individual photographs, Brunel is in a similar pose and in similar clothes, but leaning against the chains, with the camera positioned to one side of the drum. In the third individual photograph (a stereogram produced in conjunction with George Downes) Brunel, wearing lighter trousers and without his pocket watch or cigar, is seated on a post in front of the chain drum. He looks directly at the camera with his right hand tucked into his waistcoat.

== Publication ==
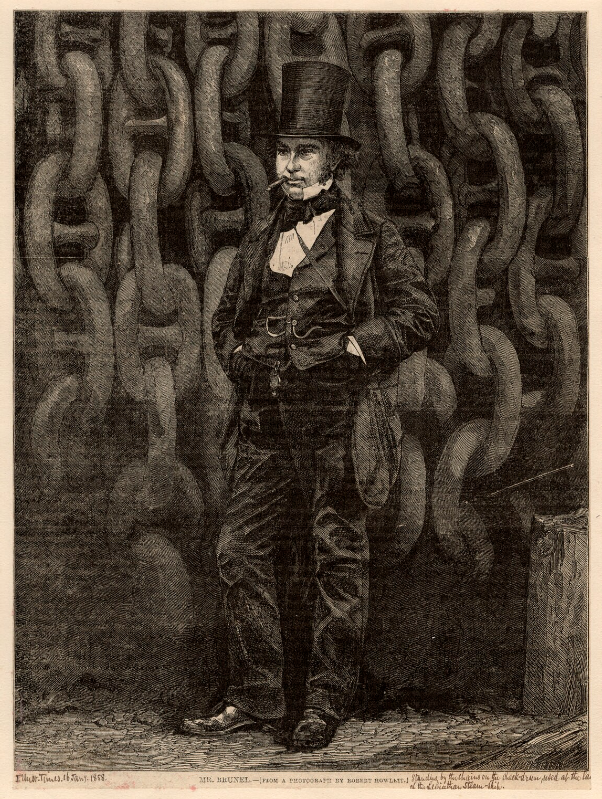
Harral's wood-engraving, as published on 16 January 1858

Isambard Kingdom Brunel Standing Before the Launching Chains of the Great Eastern was captured on a glass photographic plate from which a print was probably produced at The Photographic Institution. It was converted into an engraving by Horace Harral and published in a special edition of the Illustrated Times on 16 January 1858, ahead of the vessel's successful 31 January launch. The photograph was afterwards widely distributed as a carte-de-visite and as a stereoscopic image, it was described at the time as "among the most attractive features in the printsellers' shop windows".

The photographs were important in providing positive publicity for the Great Eastern project, which was beset with delays and financial difficulties. The series of photographs became Howlett's most famous work and was one of his last commissions; he died from fever in 1858. After Brunel's death on 15 September 1859, versions of the photograph, bearing a facsimile of his signature, were published.

== Interpretation ==
The Metropolitan Museum of Art in New York holds a copy of the photograph. They state that Brunel's pose conveys a sense of self-assurance and determination, and note that his muddied clothing reflects his willingness to get involved with the works on site. Cultural historian Charles Saumarez Smith says the photograph conveys an "impression of swaggering casualness about his achievements".

The National Portrait Gallery, London (NPG) also holds a copy of the photograph, an albumen print measuring 286 by 225 millimetres (11.3 in × 8.9 in). Their notes on the photograph describe Howlett's decision to use the chains for a backdrop, rather than the ship, as "inspired" and state that it served to humanise Brunel, by "showing him dwarfed in front of one of his own creations". They also consider that the angle chosen for this photograph makes it more powerful than Howlett's two other individual portraits of Brunel.

John Cooper's 2009 guide to the NPG collection states that the chains have come to symbolise both Brunel's ambition and the "crushing responsibilities" of work that led to his early death in 1859. Cooper's 2002 work Great Britons: The Great Debate states that the photograph "captures the spirit and modernity of Victorian engineering" and "illustrates the power of the medium to evoke a personality and a place in time".

In a 2013 PhD thesis Margo Lois Beggs describes the image as "arresting and at the same time paradoxical" for, although physically overshadowed by the chains Brunel manages to look "confident, in charge, and in command". Beggs considers that Howlett and Brunel were consciously or subconsciously imitating the American circus dwarf General Tom Thumb, popular at the time, when posing for the photograph. Brunel was certainly aware of Tom Thumb, as he had jokingly suggested it as a name for the Great Eastern. Beggs notes that the other photographs Howlett took during the launch also feature dichotomies of scale between human figures and parts of the ship and site.

== Impact ==
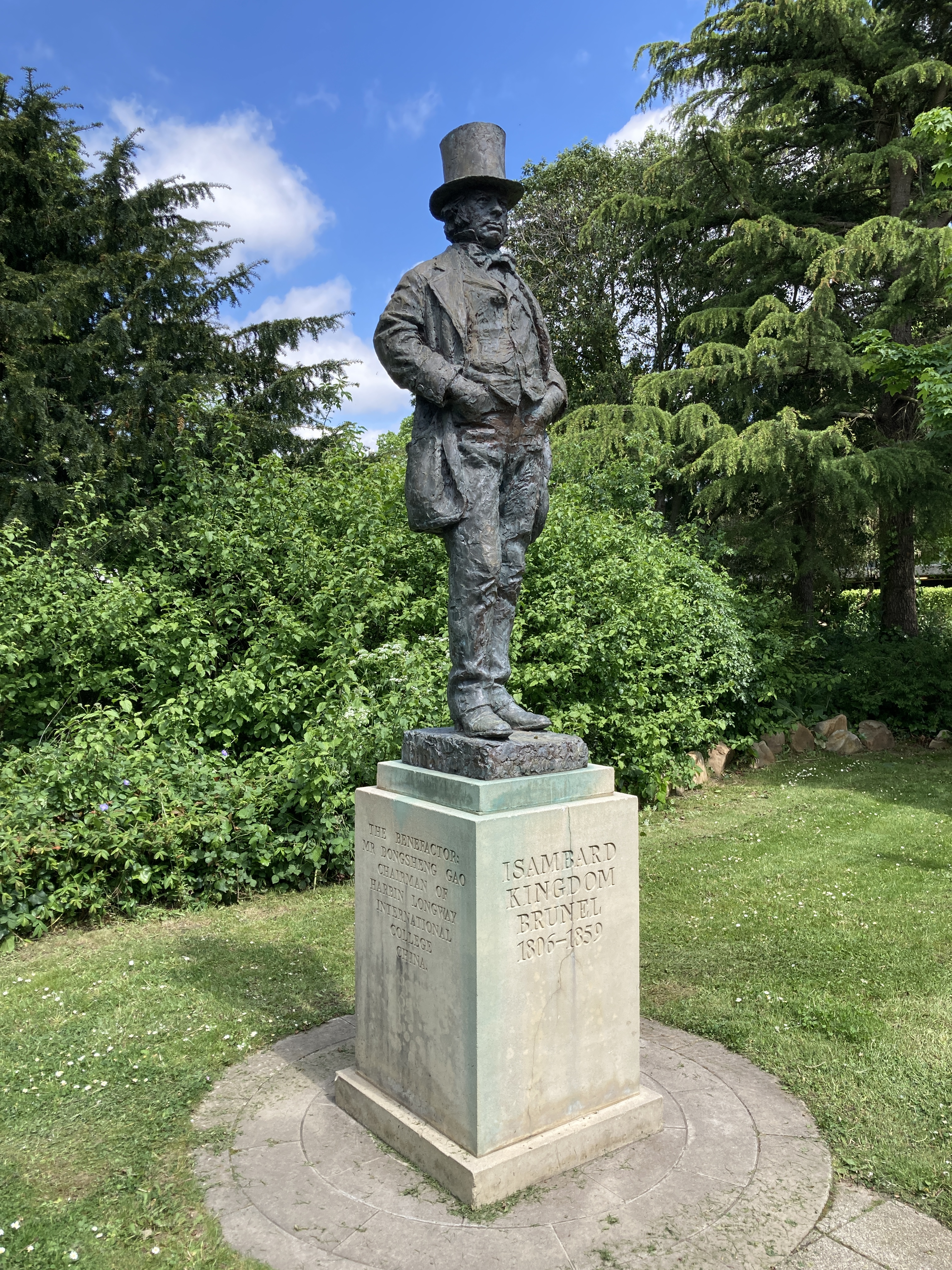
Statue at Brunel University

The photograph and others in the series are valuable examples of environmental portraiture from a period when outdoor photography was technically challenging, and many portraits were taken in studio settings. The National Heritage Memorial Fund (NHMF) claims the image has come to represent the entire industrial era, and it has been described as "one of the most famous photographs of the nineteenth century and, possibly, of all time".

The photograph has been reproduced in many books, including David Piper's The English Face (1992); Peter Funnell's Victorian Portraits in the National Portrait Gallery Collection (1996); Adam Hart-Davis's Chain Reactions (2000) and Aileen Ribeiro's The Gallery of Fashion (2000). The photograph was selected for inclusion in the Folio Society's 2006 book 100 Greatest Photographs and in the NPG's books 100 Portraits and 100 Photographs.

The Victoria and Albert Museum holds a copy of the photograph in its collection. The Brunel Museum acquired a print of the photograph in 2019 with grants from the NHMF, the Art Fund, Victoria and Albert Museum Purchase Grant Fund, and the Friends of the National Libraries. This copy was one of the originals made directly from the glass plate, likely in Howlett's studio. The print was voted the public's favourite Art Fund acquisition for 2019.

Reproductions of the photograph have been criticised for alleged tobacco bowdlerisation. A version reproduced on the cover of 2006's The Life of Isambard Kingdom Brunel, a book aimed at 5–7-year olds, had the cigar edited out. The publisher Heinemann deemed the cigar "not iconic" and possibly damaging to its sales to schools. The Brunel 200 organisation, which planned his bicentenary commemorations, condemned the move and a representative of the Institution of Civil Engineers described it as "dishonest" censorship that had "parallels with Stalin". A 2006 statue of Brunel, which drew inspiration from the photograph, at Brunel University in London also omitted the cigar. Sculptor Anthony Stones denied it was because of censorship of tobacco and said it was an artistic decision.

== See also ==
- List of photographs considered the most important
