= Horace Harral =

British wood-engraver, photographer and etcher

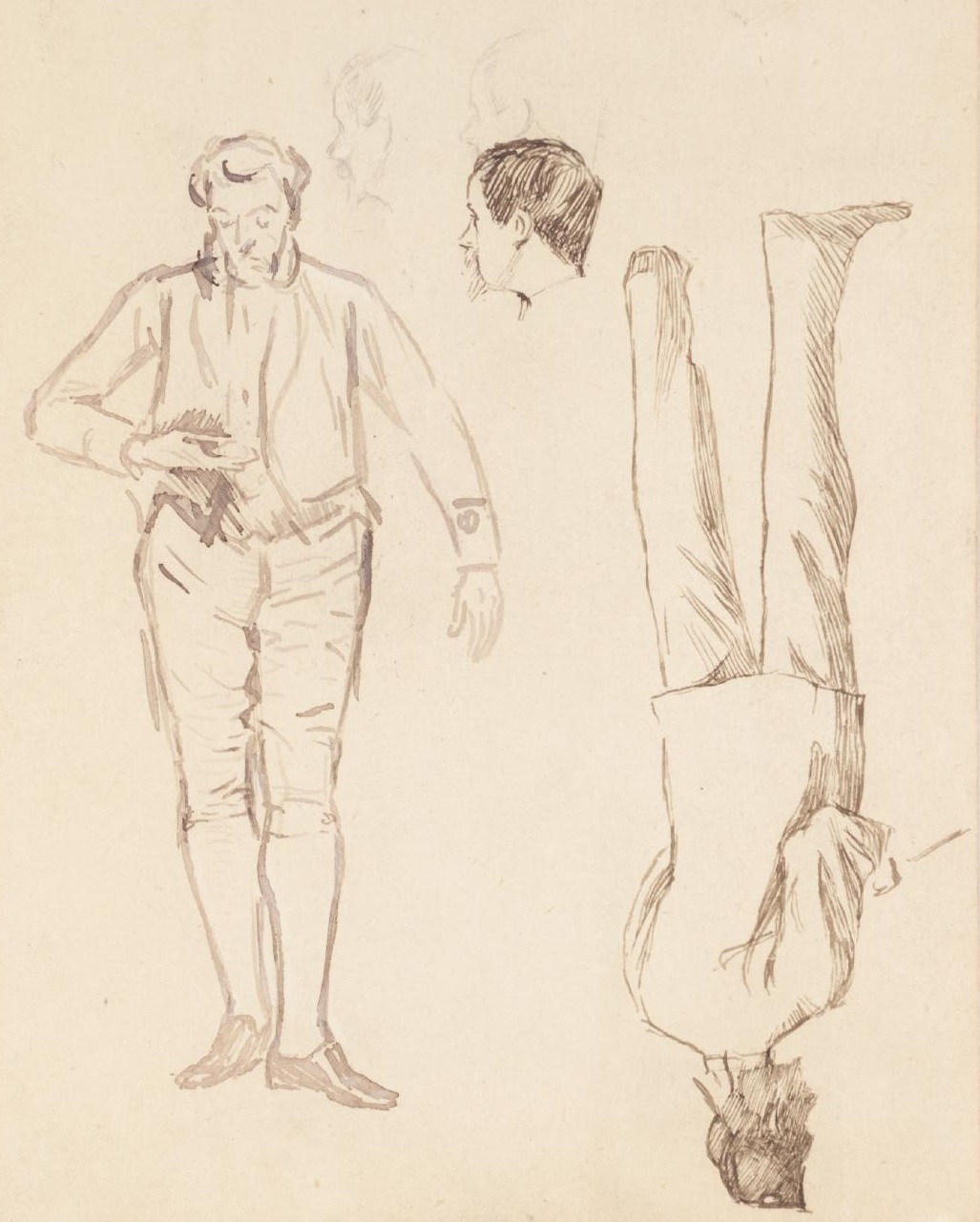
Harral and Edwin Edwards sketched by Charles Keene

Horace Downey Harral (29 June 1817 – 23 January 1905) was a British wood-engraver, etcher and photographer. He was a pupil of John Orrin Smith and later joined him as a partner in an engraving firm. Harral produced prints of many Pre-Raphaelite paintings and also illustrated many British periodicals of the mid-Victorian era. He engraved Robert Howlett's photograph Isambard Kingdom Brunel Standing Before the Launching Chains of the Great Eastern, one of the most famous and finest of the 19th century, for publication in the Illustrated Times in 1858. Harral also produced etchings and photographs. He is noted for an 1860s series of theatrically posed photographs of his friends. Harral once shared an office with William Luson Thomas and was later a significant shareholder in his company, which published The Graphic newspaper. Harral died a wealthy man and left the bulk of his estate to charity.

== Artistic career ==
Horace Downey Harral was born in 1817 at Ipswich and became a pupil of the wood-engraver John Orrin Smith. The first known prints attributed to Harral alone date to 1844. Harral went into partnership with Smith from 1849, at which point he was residing in Hatton Garden. Harral's brother, Alfred Harral (1814–1857), was also a wood-engraver. In 1852 Harral shared an office with William Luson Thomas, a wood-engraver who went on to co-found The Graphic. Harral's partnership with Smith is thought to have ended in 1854, from which time until 1856 Harral was based in Essex Street.

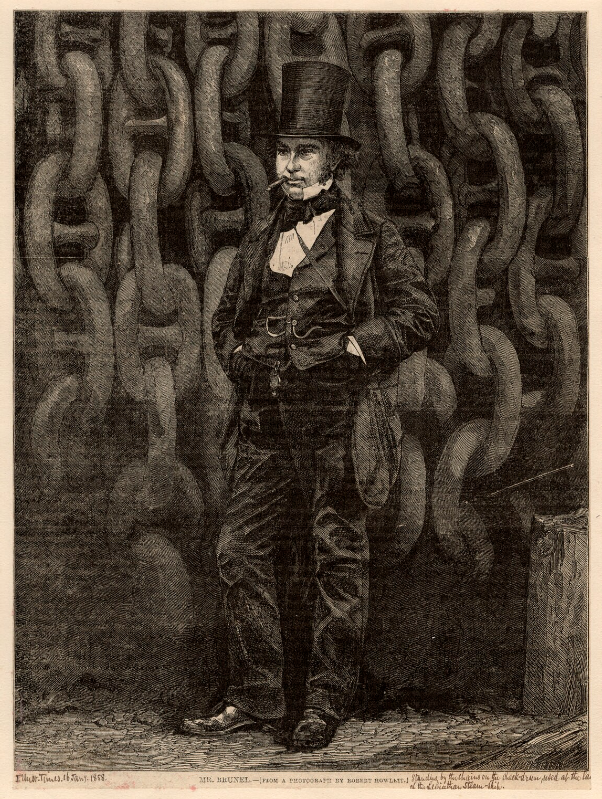
Harral's wood-engraving of Howlett's photograph of Brunel

Harral made engravings of many pre-Raphaelite paintings from the 1850s through until the 1880s. He also very active producing engravings for publication in periodicals from the 1850s to the 1870s including London Society and the Illustrated London News. Harral engraved Robert Howlett's photograph Isambard Kingdom Brunel Standing Before the Launching Chains of the Great Eastern for publication in the Illustrated Times on 16 January 1858. The work has been described as "one of the most famous photographs of the nineteenth century and, possibly, of all time." From 1856 to 1859 he resided at the Serjeant's Inn in Fleet Street and from 1861 to 1881 was at Palgrave Place in The Strand. Harral had several exhibitions at the Royal Academy between 1862 and 1870. For a period he was in partnership with fellow engraver William James Linton. Harral also carried out some photography including, in the 1860s, a series of posed photographs of his friends. The National Portrait Gallery, London has described these as being "distinguished by their technical assurance and theatrical air." Harral also made etchings. He was a friend of the artist Charles Keene and Harral noted that for a while Keene was "devoted to etching, and was constantly experimenting" in it. Harral exhibited a number of works at the 1873 Annual International Exhibition. From 1883 until 1891, when he stopped producing artistic work, Harral lived at Temple Chambers, Falcon Court in London.

Harral's engraving work has been criticised by some. Simon Shaw-Miller in his 2017 book Samuel Palmer Revisited noted that he was "not among the period's most sensitive engravers." His work on John Tenniel's Alice's White Knight has been described as "a rather heavy-handed, dull version." His engravings of Mary Ellen Edwards's plates for The Claverings have been called "inadequate" for what was the artist's best work.

== Death and legacy ==
In later life Harral resided at Chobham Cottage in Chobham, Surrey. On 23 January 1905 he died whilst at Hastings in Sussex. Harral had become a significant shareholder in Luson Thomas's company, H. R. Baines & Co., the publishers of The Graphic and his estate was worth £54,856 (£5,766,859). Harral left significant donations to many charitable organisations in his will. These included £500 (£52,564) each to: the East Suffolk and Ipswich Hospital; the Suffolk Convalescent and Sea Bathing Infirmary; the East London Hospital for Children and Dispensary for Women; the Hospital for Sick Children; the Artists' General Benevolent Institution; the Gordon Memorial College in Khartoum, Sudan; the Royal Normal College and Academy of Music for the Blind; Dr Barnardo's Homes; the Royal National Lifeboat Institution; the Free Cancer Hospital; St Luke's House (a hospital in Bayswater) and the Royal Association in Aid of the Deaf and Dumb. He also left £200 (£21,025) each to the Royal Humane Society and the Temporary Home for Lost and Starving Dogs. These bequests totalled £6,400 (£672,814); the trustees were instructed to dispose of the rest of his estate to charities of their choice, except for £1,000 (£105,127) which went to other beneficiaries.
