= Lucy Peltz =

British art historian

Dr. Lucy Peltz is Head of Collection Displays (Tudor to Regency) and Senior Curator 18th Century Collections at the National Portrait Gallery, London.

Peltz studied History of Art and French at Sussex University, followed by an MA in the History of Art at the Courtauld Institute of Art. She completed her PhD at the University of Manchester in 1998. After working at the Museum of London, Peltz joined the National Portrait Gallery in 2001.

== Selected publications ==
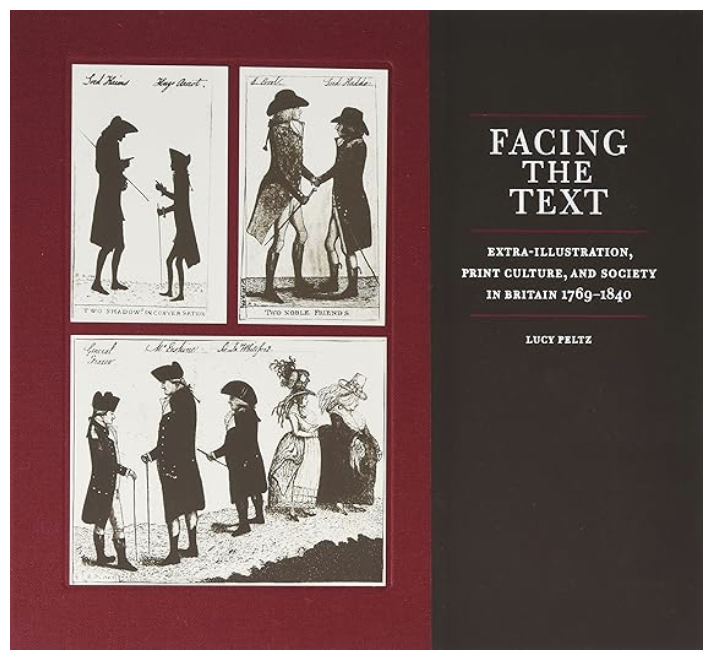
Facing the Text published by the Huntington Library in 2017

- Facing the Text: Extra-Illustration, Print Culture, and Society in Britain, 1769-1840. San Marino, California: Huntington Library, Art Collections, and Botanical Gardens, 2017. Distributed in the UK by Manchester University Press.
- Thomas Lawrence: Regency Power and Brilliance. Yale University Press, 2010. (with A. Cassandra Albinson and Peter Funnell)
- Brilliant Women: 18th Century Bluestockings. London: National Portrait Gallery, 2008. (with Elizabeth Eger)
