= Longham =

Village in Norfolk, England

Coordinates: 52.70596°N 0.87488°E

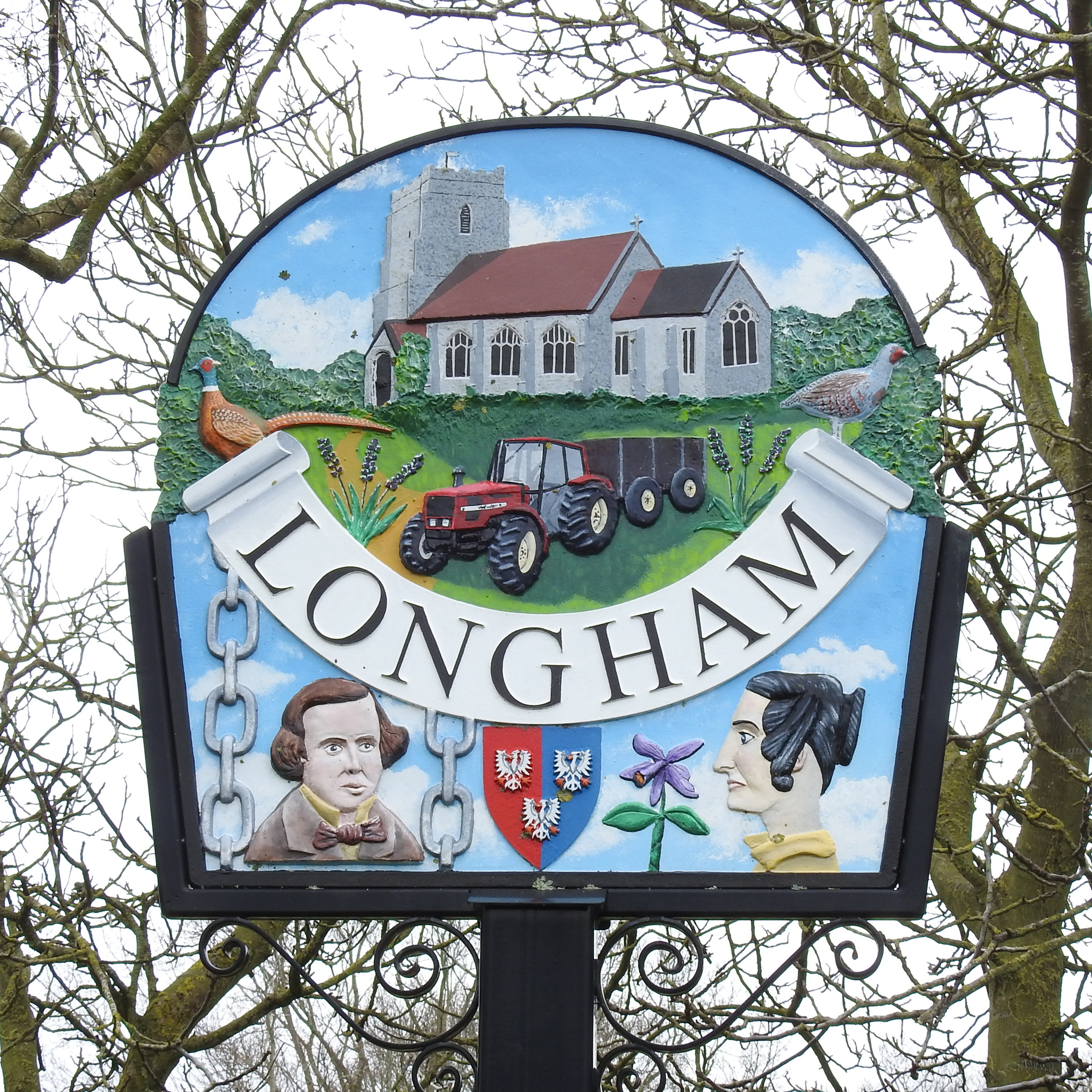
- Longham Village Sign

- Location within Norfolk
- Area: 2.08 sq mi (5.4 km^{2})
- Population: 236 (2021 census)
  - Density: 113/sq mi (44/km^{2})
- OS grid reference: TF943159
- District: Breckland
- Shire county: Norfolk
- Region: East
- Country: England
- Sovereign state: United Kingdom
- Post town: DEREHAM
- Postcode district: NR19
- Dialling code: 01362
- Police: Norfolk
- Fire: Norfolk
- Ambulance: East of England
- UK Parliament: South West Norfolk
- Website: http://www.longham.org.uk/

Longham is a village and civil parish in the English county of Norfolk.

The village lies 5 miles (8.0 km) north-west of Dereham and 19 miles (31 km) north-west of Norwich.

== History ==
Longham's name is of Anglo-Saxon origin and derives from the Old English for the homestead of Lawa's people.

In the Domesday Book, Longham is listed as a settlement of 3 households in the hundred of Launditch. In 1086, the village was part of the East Anglian estates of Hermer de Ferrers.

Robert Howlett (1831-1858), a pioneering photographer, grew-up in the parsonage at Longham. He was famed for photographing Isambard Kingdom Brunel in 1857 as well as certain episodes of the Crimean War.

During the Second World War, part of the parish became RAF Wendling which opened in 1943 for the use of the Eighth Air Force of the United States Army Air Forces who kept some forces at the site until 1961.

== Geography ==
According to the 2021 census, Longham has a population of 236 people which shows an increase from the 224 people recorded in the 2011 census.

== Church of St. Andrew and St. Peter ==
Longham's parish church is jointly dedicated to Saint Andrew and Saint Peter and dates from the Fifteenth Century. St. Andrew & St. Peter's is located just off Reed Lane and has been Grade II listed since 1960. The church is open for monthly Sunday service and is part of the Launditch Benefice.

St. Andrew and St. Peter's Churchtower was largely rebuilt in the mid-Eighteenth Century.

== Governance ==
Longham is part of the electoral ward of Lincoln for local elections and is part of the district of Breckland.

The village's national constituency is South West Norfolk which has been represented by Labour's Terry Jermy MP since 2024.

== War Memorial ==
Longham War Memorial is a small stone memorial located in St. Peter and St. Andrew's Churchyard. The memorial lists the following names for the First World War:

Rank	Name	Unit	Date of death	Burial/Commemoration
Pte.	Stephen M. Watts	1st Bn., The Buffs	3 Jan. 1919	Südfriedhof
Pte.	John F. Rudd	1st Bn., East Surrey Regiment	13 Mar. 1917	Gorre British & Indian Cemetery
Pte.	Thomas C. Fiddy	1st Bn., Essex Regiment	6 Aug. 1915	Twelve Tree Copse Cemetery
Pte.	Leslie Thompson	30th Coy., Machine Gun Corps	19 Oct. 1918	Terlincthun British Cemetery
Pte.	Ernest R. Purple	142nd Coy., M.G.C.	5 May 1916	Arras Memorial
Pte.	Richard Thompson	7th Bn., Norfolk Regiment	14 Oct. 1916	Heilly Station Cemetery
Pte.	Frederick Webster	7th Bn., Norfolk Regt.	6 Nov. 1915	Bethune Town Cemetery
Rfn.	George Kirk	King's Royal Rifle Corps	29 Sep. 1918	Ss. Peter & Andrew's Churchyard
