= Frederick Richard Pickersgill =

British painter (1820–1900)

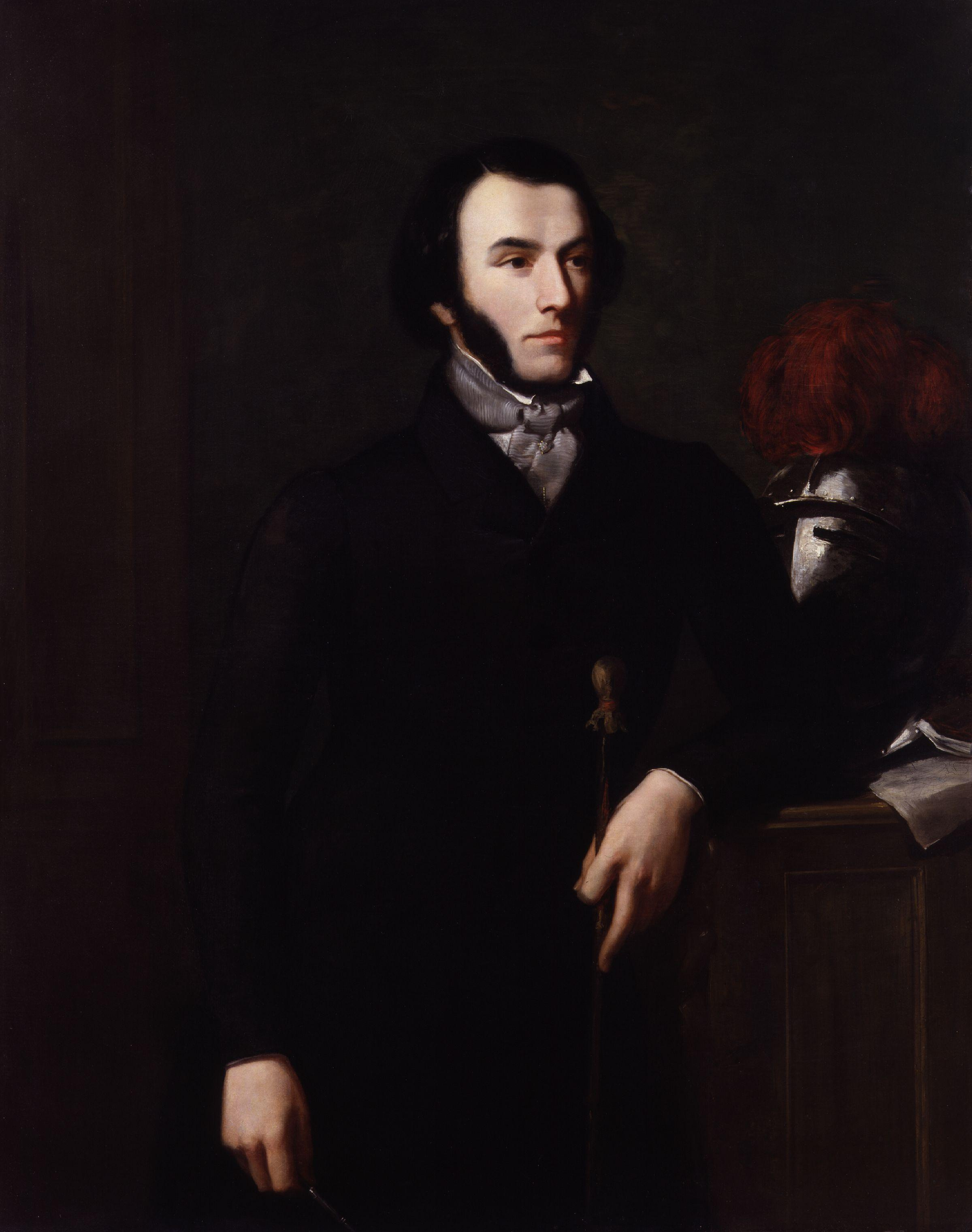
- Self portrait, c. 1850
- Born: 25 September 1820; London, England
- Died: 20 December 1900 (aged 80); Yarmouth, Isle of Wight, England
- Notable work: The Burial of Harold; Orsino and Viola

Frederick Richard Pickersgill RA (Note: Elected in 1857, Pickersgill retired from his position as Royal Academician in 1888.) (25 September 1820 – 20 December 1900) was an English painter and book illustrator. Born in London into a family of artists, he was admitted to the Royal Academy Schools in 1840. He exhibited regularly at the Royal Academy between 1839 and 1875. Most of these works depicted scenes drawn from literature (including Edmund Spenser and John Milton), religion, and history.

Pickersgill's The Burial of Harold was accepted as a decoration for the Houses of Parliament in 1847 for the sum of £500. He also did some landscapes under the influence of the Pre-Raphaelites.

In 1856 Pickersgill was photographed at The Photography Institute by Robert Howlett, as part of a series of portraits of artists. The picture was among a group exhibited at the Art Treasures Exhibition in Manchester in 1857. In addition, Pickersgill seems to have experimented with photography himself.

Pickersgill was elected an Associate of the Royal Academy in 1847 and a full Royal Academician in June 1857, but retired in 1888. He was keeper of the Royal Academy Schools from 1873 to 1887.

== Gallery ==
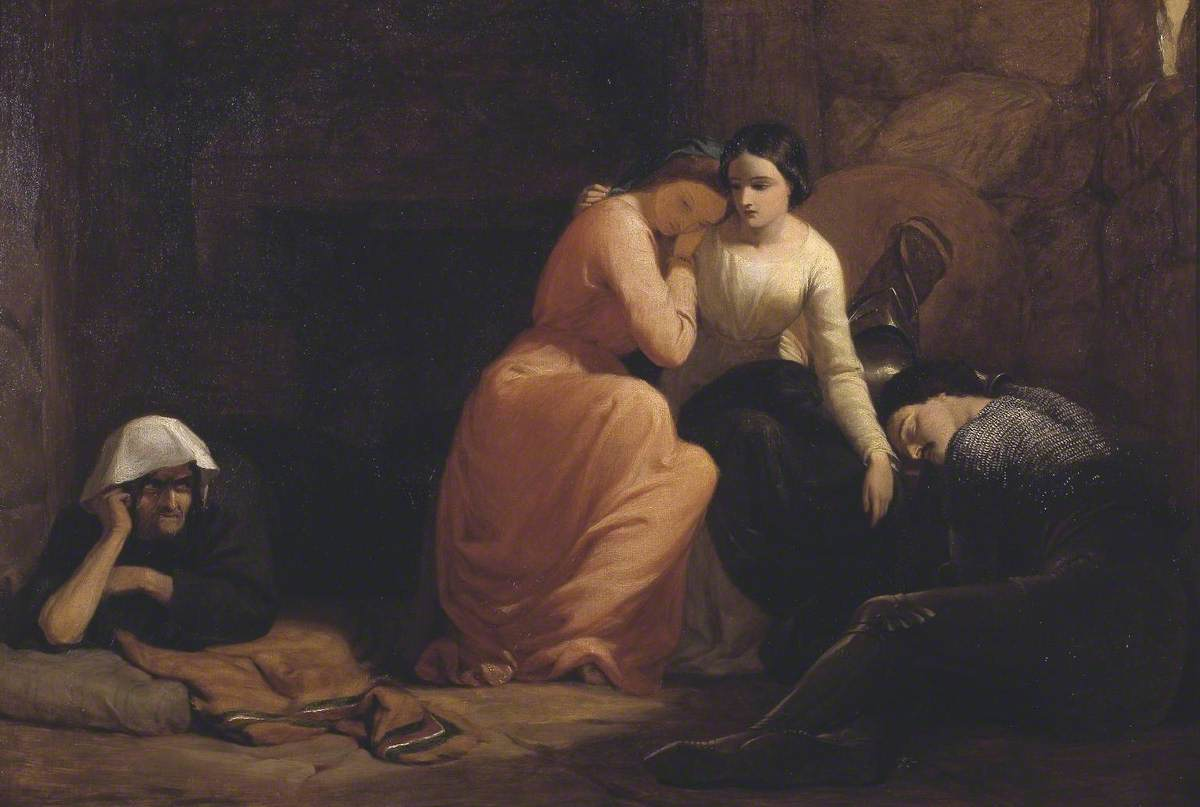
Amoret, Aemylia and Prince Arthur, 1845

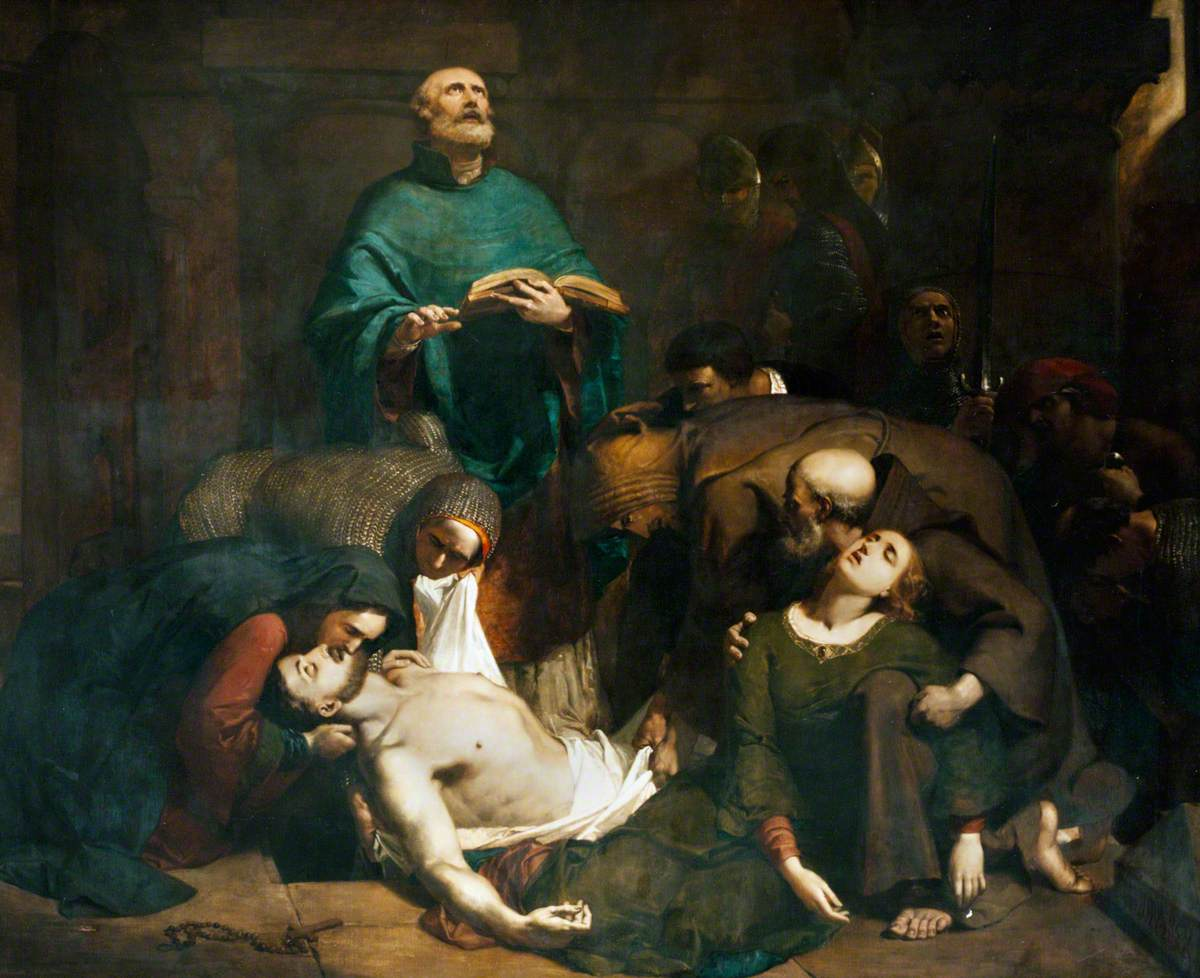
The Burial of Harold at Waltham Abbey, 1847

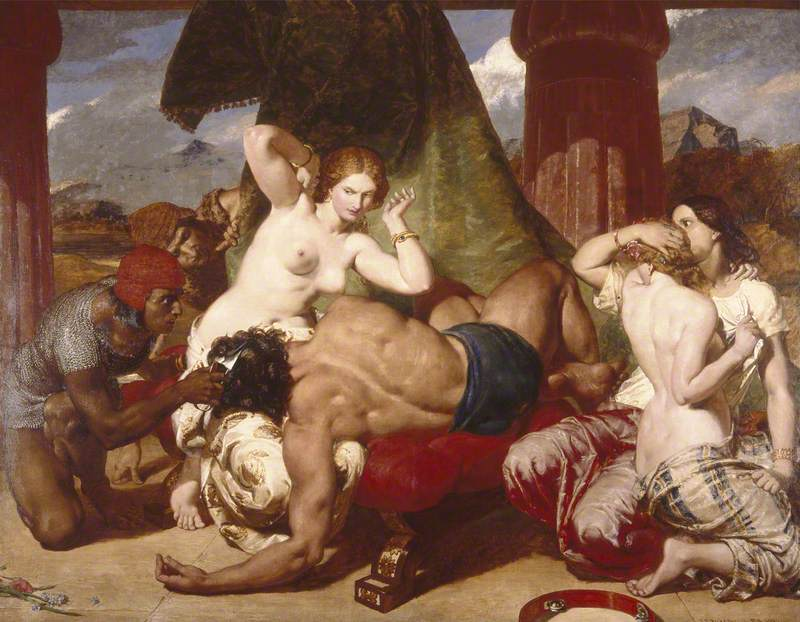
Samson Betrayed, 1850

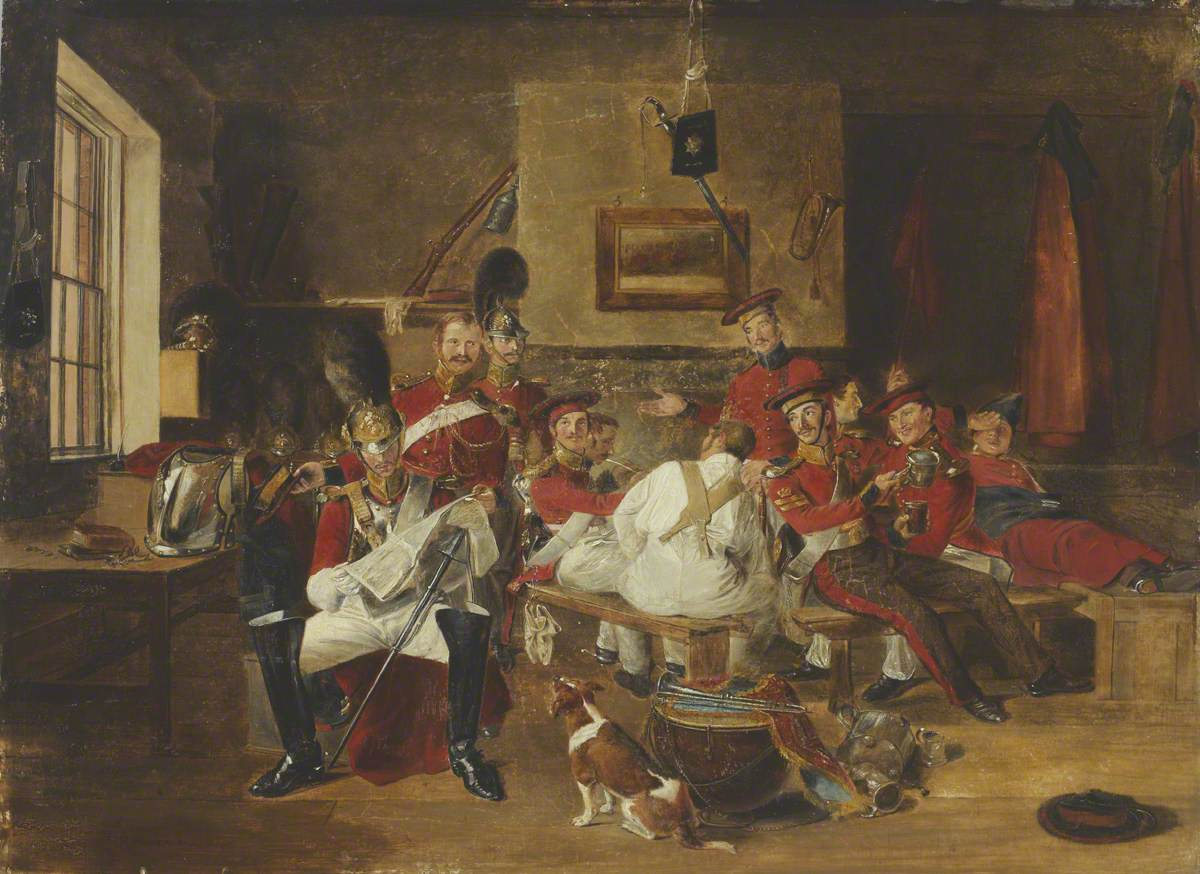
2nd Life Guards, Guard Room, 1851

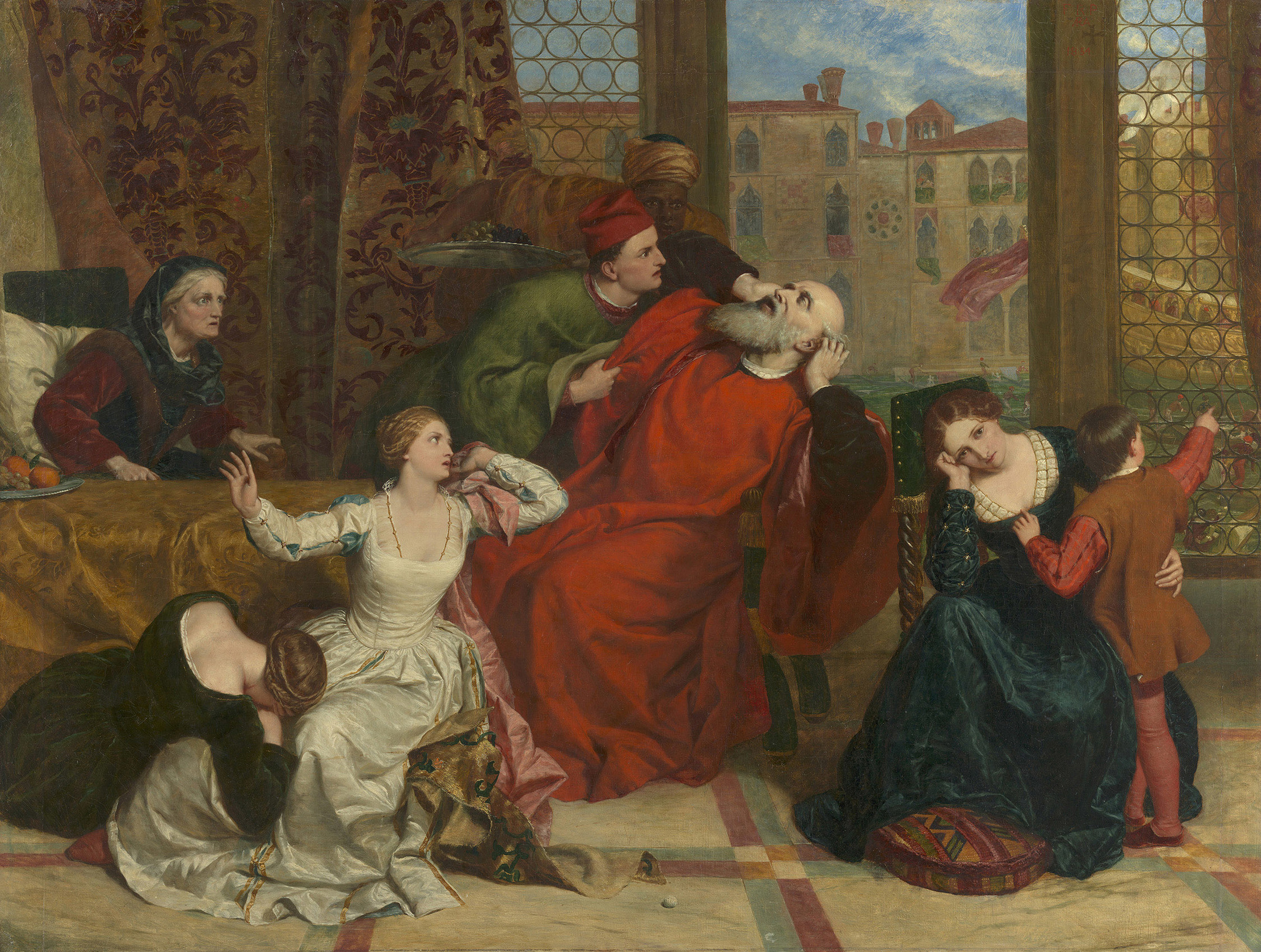
The Death of Francesco Foscari, Doge of Venice, 1854

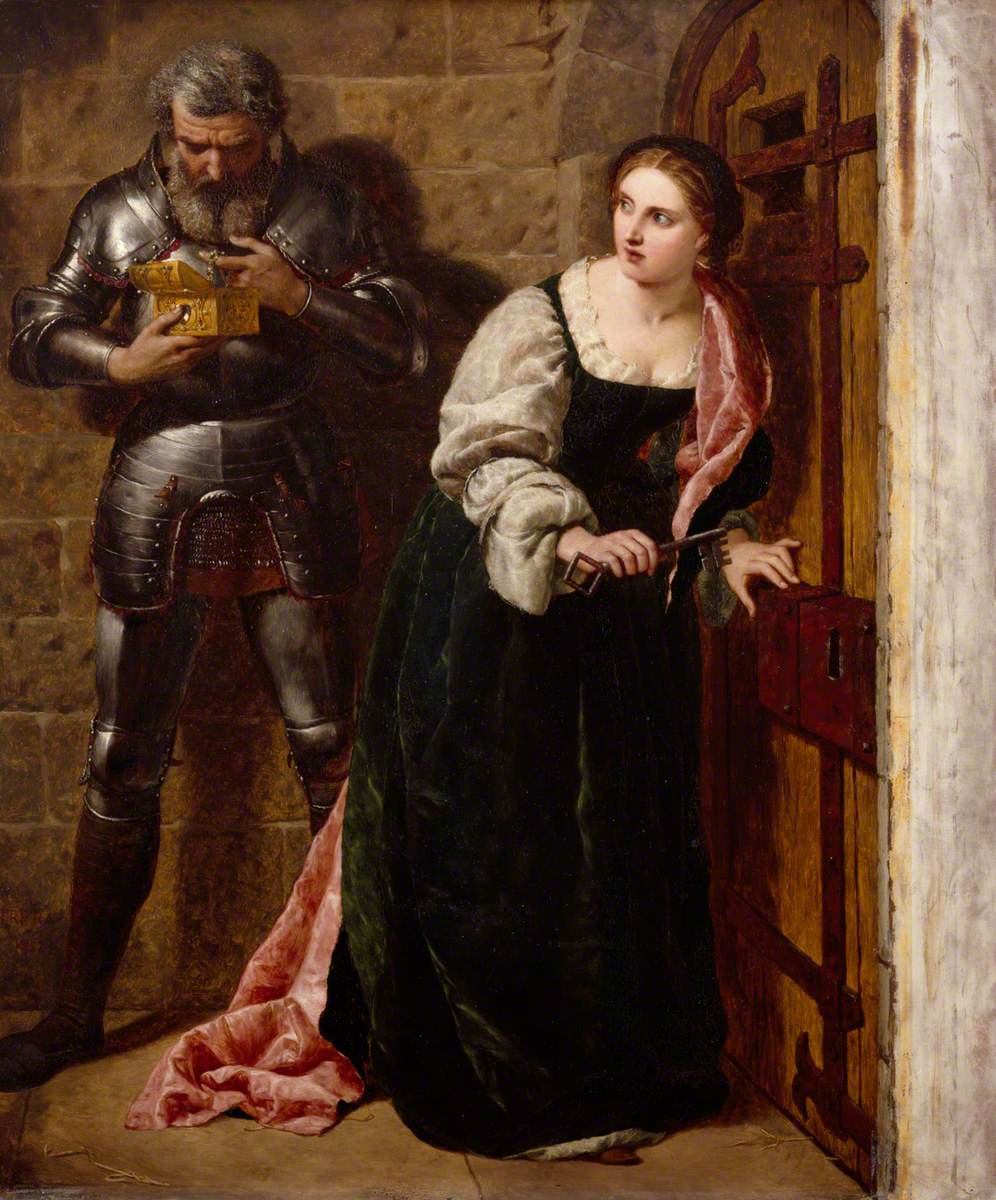
The Bribe, 1857

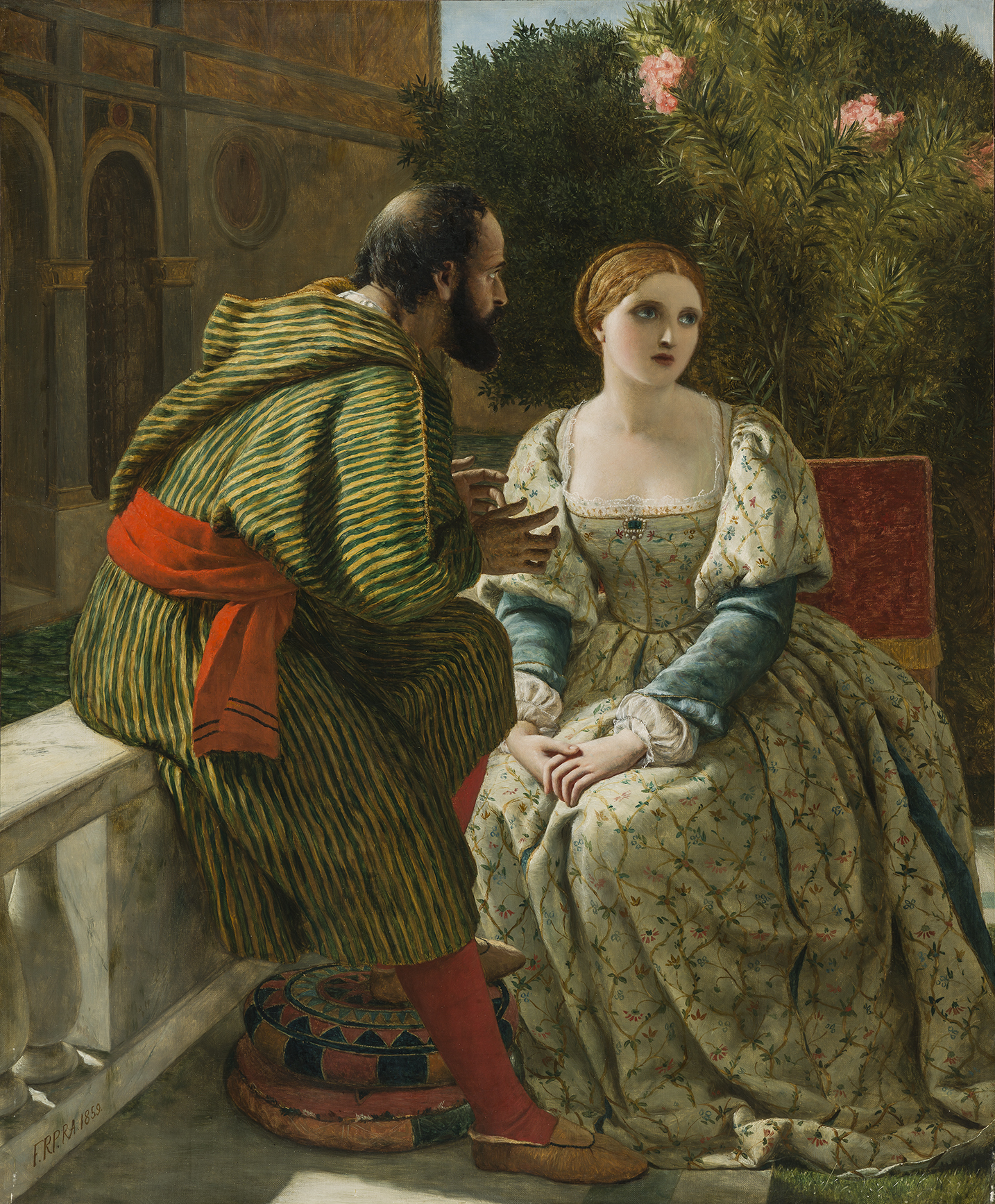
Othello and Desdemona, 1859

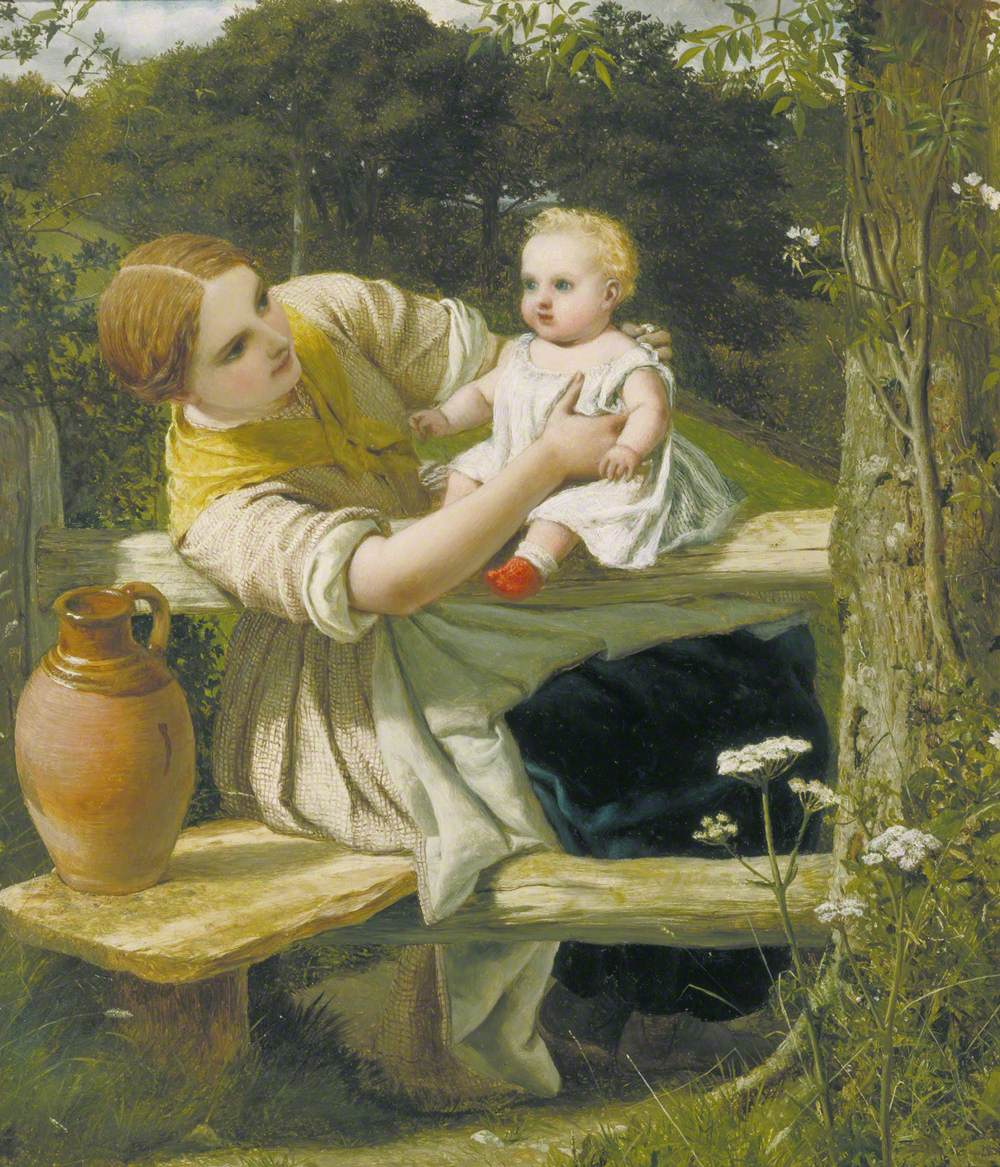
On the Way to the Spring, 1862

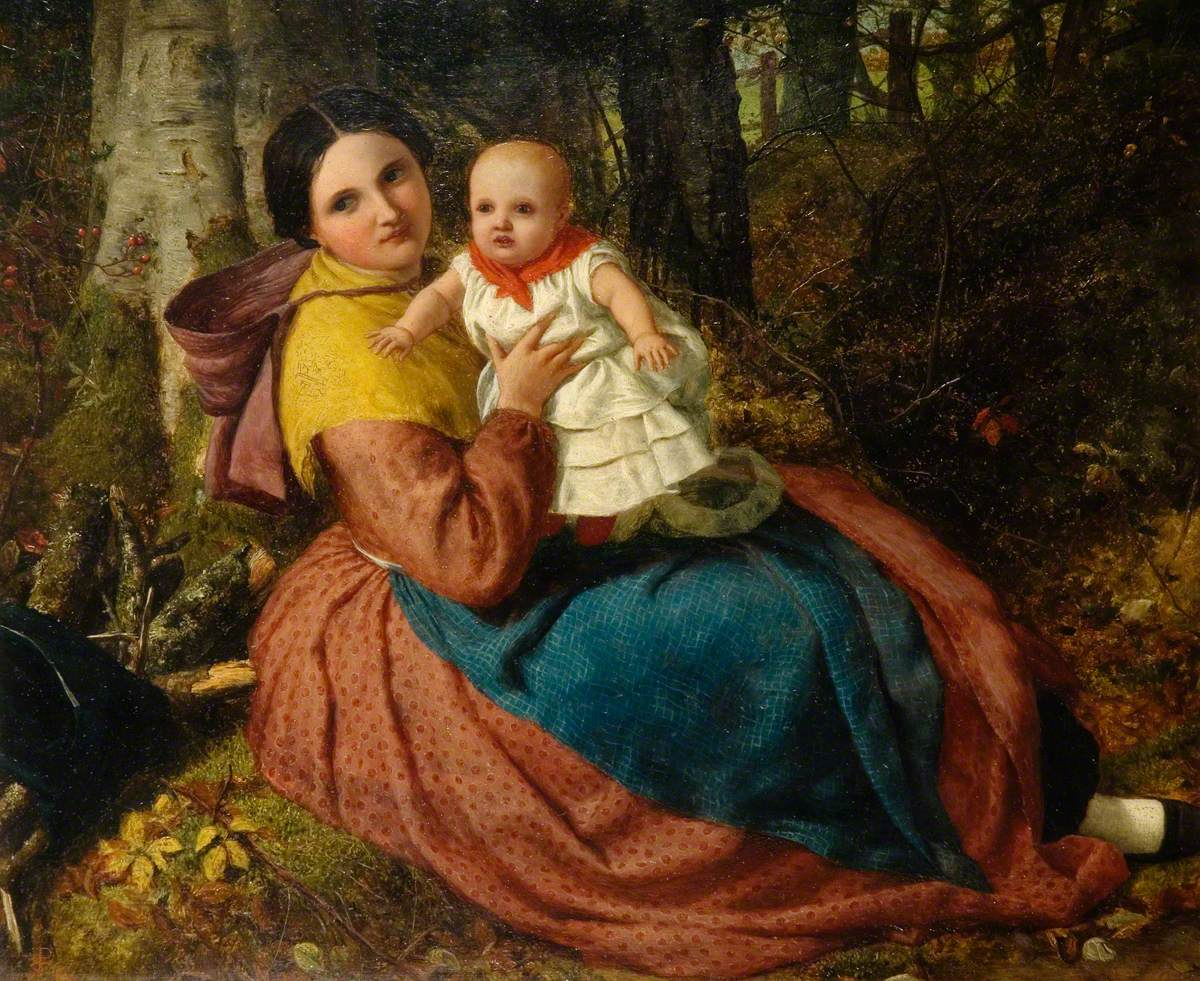
The Artist's Son and Nurse, 1863

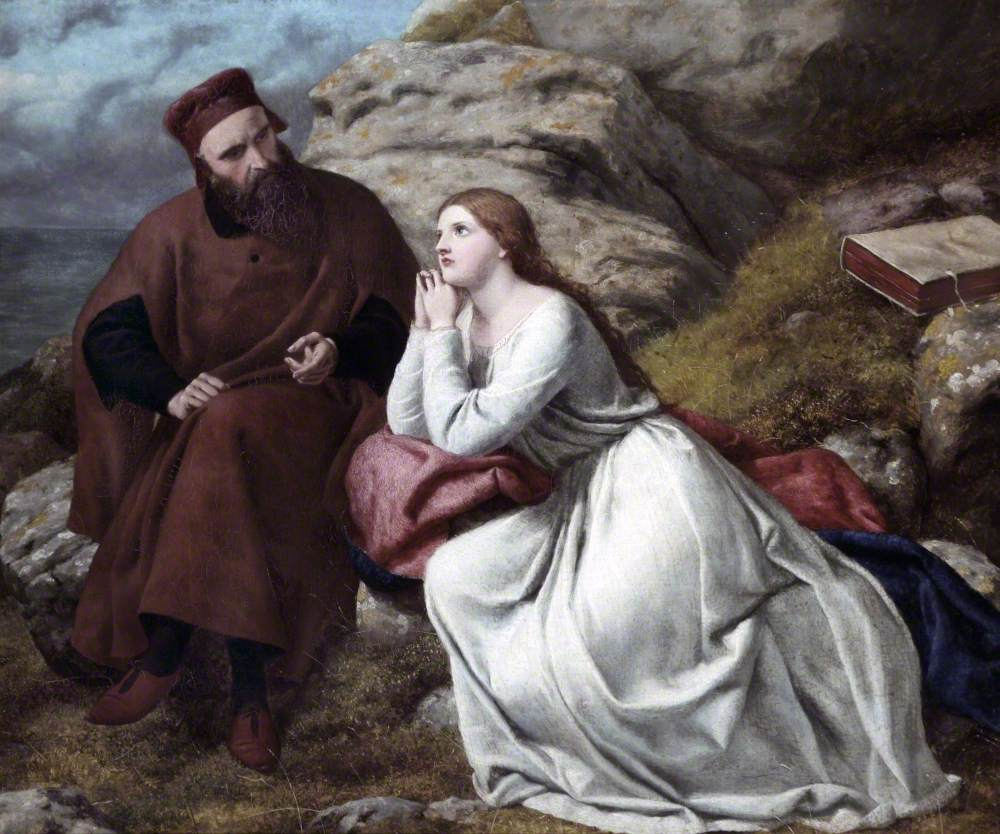
Prospero and Miranda, 1865
