= Thomas Frederick Hardwich =

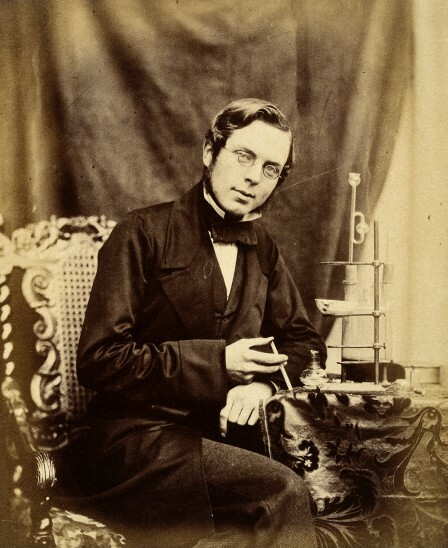
Hardwich in 1857

Reverend Thomas Frederick Hardwich (18 September 1829 – 24 June 1890) was a photographic chemist, writer on photographic chemistry, demonstrator and lecturer in photography at King's College London, and the author of A Manual of Photographic Chemistry including the practice of the Collodion Process (first edition 1855 and later editions to 1883), then later, curate of St John, Shildon, in the diocese of Durham.

== Career ==
Thomas Frederick Hardwich held the positions of Curator of laboratory (1850-1854); Demonstrator of Chemistry (1851-1854); and, Lecturer of Photography (1857-1860). He was elected to membership of the Photographic Society (later Royal Photographic Society on 1 March 1855 and was an active participant in the Society's activities until his abrupt resignation in 1861. He was also a member of the Photographic Society Club, a group of members of the Photographic Society, which formed to exchange photographs. He was also an honorary member of the Photographic Society of Bombay. Hardwich also formulated a popular collodion that was sold extensively and was used by the Collodion Committee of the Photographic Society. He was a member of the Society's important Fading Committee which was convened at the request of Prince Albert to look at the causes and possible means of preventing the fading of photographic prints.

Hardwich was also on the council of the Photographic Association which led to him resigning from the Photographic Society's council.

He formed a close working relationship with the photographer Robert Howlett and Howlett's death on 2 December 1858 had a profound effect on him. Hardwich left London and took holy orders, becoming a Minister of the Church of England and wrote in 1861 that 'he will shortly enter into holy orders with a view to "spending the remainder of his life in preaching the gospel"'. He was ordained as a Deacon by Lord Bishop of Durham on 10 November 1861, and became curate at the church of his father-in-law, St John's at Shildon. Hardwich wrote in 1861 that 'Photography, as you may imagine, is at a standstill' and concluded by stating that he shall always feel interested in the progress of the art. In 1867 he became Rector of St. Saviour's Parish Church, Shotton Colliery, County Durham, where he remained until his death.

== Personal life ==
Hardwich was the son of Lieut. John Hardwich R.N. (1795-1846) of Westbury-sub-Mendip, Somerset and Ann Norman. He was educated at Kings School, Sherborne between 1841-1844 and then at King's College, London Medical Department (1847-1848). He matriculated in 1849-1850 and was Elected Daniell Scholar 1850; and passed the 1st M.B. Examination 1850. He married Junie Caroline Manisty (1834-1905) in 1863 at Shildon, Durham. He had six children: Junie Frances Hardwich (1864-1881), Frederick Norman Hardwich (1866–1896), James Edward Hardwich (1868-1913), Sarah May Hardwich (1870-1917), John Manisty Hardwich (1873-1959), Walter Henry Albert Hardwich (1876-1946).

== Death ==
He died at Shotton Vicarage, Easington, County Durham, on 24 June 1890, leaving an estate of £10,170 13s 7d.
