= Robert Howlett =

British photographer

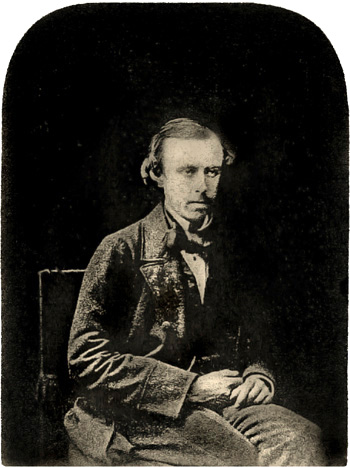
- Born: 3 July 1831; Theberton, Suffolk, England
- Died: 2 December 1858 (aged 27); London, England
- Occupation: Photographer

Robert Howlett (3 July 1831 (Note: Howlett's date of birth is erroneously given as 1830 in many sources and recent work in parish registers has confirmed the 1831 date. He was baptised on 25 September 1831 in Theberton.) – 2 December 1858) was a British pioneering photographer whose pictures are widely exhibited in major galleries. Howlett produced portraits of Crimean War heroes, genre scenes and landscapes. His photographs include the iconic picture of Isambard Kingdom Brunel which was part of a commission by the London-based weekly newspaper Illustrated Times to document the construction of the world's largest steamship, the SS Great Eastern.

He exhibited at the London Photographic Society and published On the Various Methods of Printing Photographic Pictures upon Paper, with Suggestions for Their Preservation. He worked in partnership with Joseph Cundall at "The Photographic Institution" at New Bond Street, London.

Howlett made photographic studies for the artist William Powell Frith to assist him on his vast modern panorama painting The Derby Day (1856–58; Tate, London) which was exhibited at the Royal Academy of Arts in 1858.

Howlett was commissioned by Queen Victoria and Prince Albert to photograph the frescoes in the new drawing-room at Buckingham Palace, make copies of the paintings by Raphael and make a series of portraits called 'Crimean Heroes' which was exhibited in 1857 the Photographic Society of London's annual exhibition.

Howlett died in 1858, aged 27. His death was apparently due to typhoid (rather than as a result of over-exposure to dangerous chemicals, as was suggested by some at the time, a myth that has continued to this day). The Illustrated Times praised him as "one of the most skillful photographers of the day."

Prints from Howlett's photographs were published posthumously by his late partners Cundall & Downes under their own name, and by the London Stereoscopic and Photographic Company.

== Early life and education ==
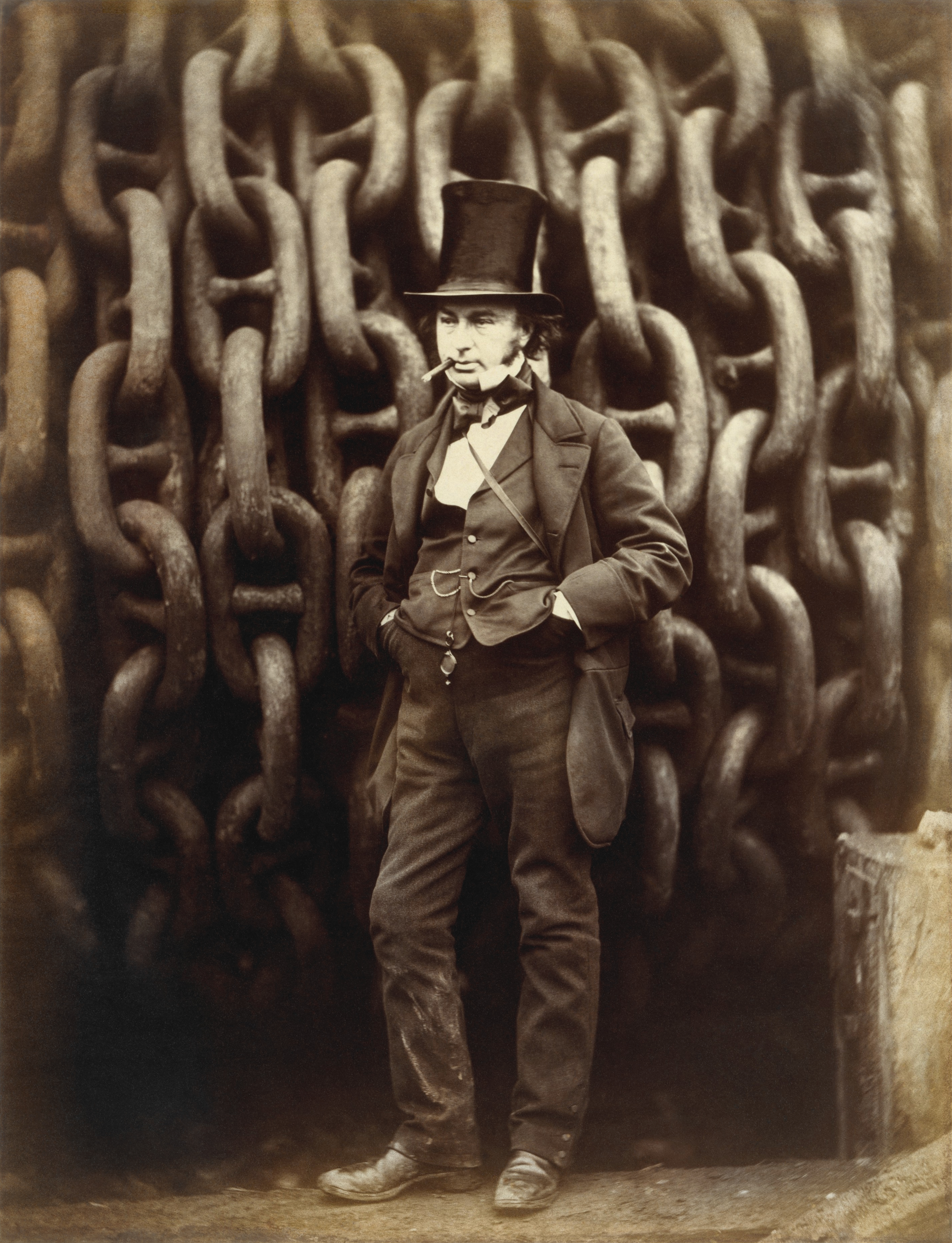
Isambard Kingdom Brunel Standing Before the Launching Chains of the Great Eastern by Robert Howlett (1857)

Howlett was the second of four sons of Reverend Robert Howlett and Harriet Harsant. Two brothers died in infancy and his younger brother Thomas became a farmer. He was born in Theberton, Suffolk and the family had moved to Longham, Norfolk by the time he was 9 years old. His maternal grandfather, Thomas Harsant, a surgeon, constructed telescopes, microscopes, electrical machines, implements and instruments. Robert built his own microscope when a child. Thomas Harsant died in 1852 and left him £1000 plus his "turning lathe and all the apparatus and tools belonging thereto". Thus he was able to move to London.

== Career ==
In London Howlett rose to prominence while working for the Photographic Institution at 168 New Bond Street, London, which was a leading establishment for the commercial promotion of photography through exhibitions, publications, and commissions. Although the Photographic Institution was established in 1853 by Joseph Cundall and Philip Henry Delamotte, it is believed that Howlett replaced Delamotte, who became professor of drawing at King's College London. He was elected to membership of the Photographic Society of London, later the Royal Photographic Society, in December 1855 and remained a member until his death.

By 1856 Howlett was mentioned in the photographic press. He sent prints to the annual exhibitions of photographic societies in London, Manchester, and Norwich. These included landscape studies, In the Valley of the River Mole, Mickleham, and Box Hill, Surrey, which are presumed to have been taken in 1855.

He exhibited at the London Photographic Society and in 1856 published a booklet "On the Various Methods of Printing Photographic Pictures upon Paper, with Suggestions for Their Preservation". He also designed and sold 'dark room tents' and worked in partnership with Joseph Cundall at "The Photographic Institution" at 168 New Bond Street, London.

Howlett undertook the first of a number of commissions for Queen Victoria and Prince Albert in 1856, working for the Photographic Institution. These included copying the works of Raphael for Prince Albert, and making a series of portraits of heroic soldiers from the Crimean War. These were first exhibited in 1857 as 'Crimean Heroes' at the Photographic Society of London's annual exhibition. (Note: There are 2 discrete sets of 'Crimean Heroes' pictures. One by Howlett and the other by Joseph Cundall.) In 2004 Cundall and Howlett's portraits of Crimean war veterans, were used by the Royal Mail for a set of six postage stamps to mark the 150th anniversary of the conflict.

Howlett's studio portraits at 'The Photographic Institute' included eminent 'fine artists' such as William Powell Frith, Frederick Richard Pickersgill, John Callcott Horsley, and Thomas Webster which were among a larger group exhibited at the Art Treasures Exhibition in Manchester in 1857.

Howlett was commissioned to make photographic studies of the crowd at the 1856 Epsom Derby for the painter William Powell Frith, who used them in 1858 for his painting of The Derby Day which was exhibited at the Royal Academy of Art in 1859. The photographs were taken from the roof of a cab.

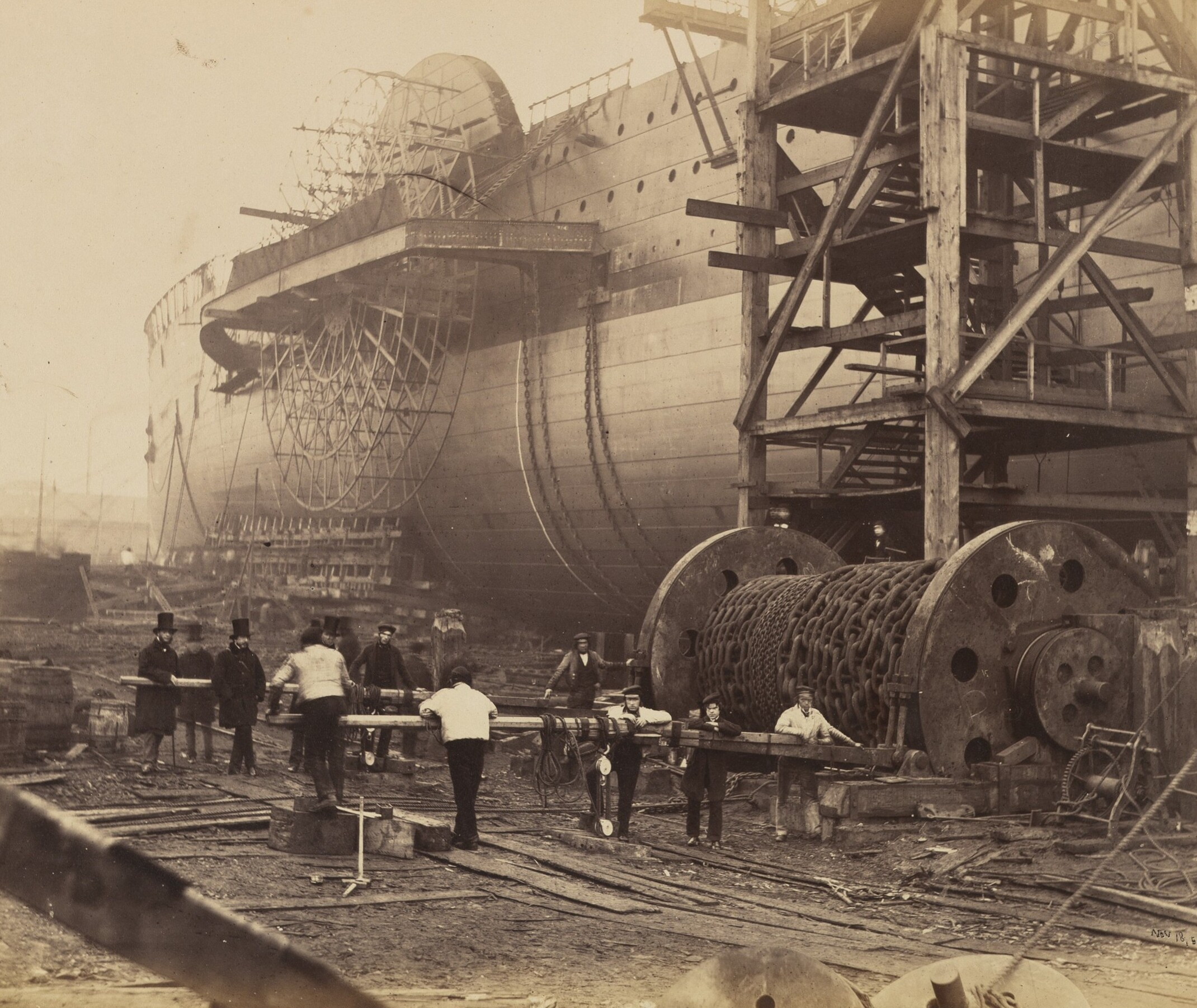
Great Eastern steamship under construction (1857), photograph by Robert Howlett

== The Great Eastern ==
Howlett's major work was the commission by The Illustrated Times Weekly Newspaper to document the construction of the world's largest steamship, the SS Great Eastern. His images were translated into wood-engravings by Henry Vizetelly for the Illustrated Times. They reflected and stimulated the widespread interest in this feat of engineering.

This project included the well-known portrait of the Great Eastern's creator and engineer, Isambard Kingdom Brunel, standing in front of the giant launching chains on the 'checking drum' braking mechanism at John Scott Russell's Millwall shipyard. It was taken to celebrate the launch of the world's largest steamship, in November 1857.

This image, which depicts Brunel in an industrial setting instead of a more traditional background for a portrait, has been described as "one of the first examples of environmental portraiture".

== Death ==
"He was so full of enthusiasm and excitement, that … he appeared to be running here and there and everywhere, and doing in one day as much as most men would accomplish in two or three".

— The Journal of the Photographic Society, 21 December 1858.

Howlett died in 1858, aged 27, at his home and studio at 10 Bedford Place, Campden Hill, shortly after returning from a trip to France to try out a new 'wide angle lens'. The cause of death was apparently due to typhoid, rather than (as suggested by some at the time) to over-exposure to the chemicals used in the Collodion photographic process invented by Frederick Scott Archer in about 1850. The Illustrated Times praised him as "one of the most skillful photographers of the day". The death certificate simply states febris (fever), 20 days. Howlett had originally told his friend Thomas Frederick Hardwich that he had a cold.

=== Grave ===
Howlett is buried at the church of St Peter and St Paul, Wendling, Norfolk, where his father was perpetual curate. His gravestone is to the east of the chancel.

In 2017 a campaign led by his biographer, Rose Teanby, succeeded in having his grave restored, followed by a re-dedication service on 14 October 2017.

== Galleries showing Robert Howlett ==
- London, National Portrait Gallery
- London, Victoria and Albert Museum
- New York, Hans P. Kraus, Jr., Fine Photographs
- San Francisco Museum of Modern Art
- Cleveland Museum of Art

== Bibliography ==
- On the Various Methods of Printing Photographic Pictures upon Paper, with Suggestions for Their Preservation, by Robert Howlett

== Modern tribute ==
In 2008, photojournalist David White recreated both Howlett's camera and the Brunel commission, travelling across south and west England.

In 2009, the article The Light Shone and Was Spent: Robert Howlett and the Power of Photography by David White was published.

== Sources ==
- Sources listed at Oxford Dictionary of National Biography, Roger Taylor, Oxford University Press, 2004.accessed 2 Dec 2008
1. G. Seiberling and C. Bloor, Amateurs, photography, and the mid-Victorian imagination (1986)
2. Mr Hardwick, Journal of the Photographic Society, 5 (1858–59), 111–12
3. A. Hamber, A higher branch of the arts (1996)
4. R. Taylor, Critical moments: British photographic exhibitions, 1839–1865', Data base, priv. coll.
5. Death Certificate. · CGPLA Eng. & Wales (1859)
