= Jan Marsh =

British writer and curator

Jan Marsh (born 5 October 1942) is a British writer and curator who is an expert on the Victorian period and particularly the Pre-Raphaelites and William Morris. Marsh is a former president of the William Morris Society, a trustee of the William Morris Gallery and a fellow of the Royal Historical Society.

== Selected publications ==
- Edward Thomas: A Poet for His Country. London: Paul Elek, 1978.
- Back to the Land: The Pastoral Impulse in Victorian England from 1880 to 1914. London: Quartet, 1982.
- Pre-Raphaelite Sisterhood. London: Quartet Books, 1985.
- Jane and May Morris: A Biographical Story 1839-1938. Rivers Oram Press/Pandora List, 1986.
- Pre-Raphaelite Women: Images of Femininity in Pre-Raphaelite Art. London: Weidenfeld & Nicolson, 1987.
- Women Artists and the Pre-Raphaelite Movement. London: Sphere, 1987. (co-authored with Pamela Gerrish Nunn)
- The Legend of Elizabeth Siddal. London: Quartet, 1989.
- The Woman's Domain: Women and the English Country House. London: Viking, 1990. (co-authored with Trevor Lummis)
- Christina Rossetti: A Literary Biography. London: Jonathan Cape, 1994.
- Bloomsbury Women: Distinct Figures in Life and Art. London: Pavilion Book, 1995.
- The Pre-Raphaelites: Their Lives in Letters and Diaries. London: Trafalgar Square, 1996.
- The Pre-Raphaelites. London: National Portrait Gallery, 1998. (Character Sketches series)
- Dante Gabriel Rossetti: Painter and Poet. London: Weidenfeld & Nicolson, 1999.
- Dante Gabriel Rossetti: Collected Writings. London: J. M. Dent & Sons, 1999.
- Christina Rossetti: Selected Poems. London: Phoenix, 2002. (editor)
- Spoken, Broken and Bloody English: The Story of George Bernard Shaw, Linguaphone and Eliza Doolittle, London: Linguaphone Institute, 2002. With foreword by Lord Quirk. ISBN 0747309493
- Black Victorians: Black People in British Art 1800-1900. London: Lund Humphries, 2005. (editor)
- William Morris and Red House: A Collaboration Between Architect and Owner. National Trust Books, 2005. ISBN 1905400012
- The Pre-Raphaelite Circle. London: National Portrait Gallery, 2005. (Insights series)
- A Guide to Victorian and Edwardian Portraits. London: National Portrait Gallery in association with the National Trust, 2011. (co-authored with Peter Funnell)
- The Pre-Raphaelite Circle. London: National Portrait Gallery.
- The Collected Letters of Jane Morris. Boydell & Brewer, 2012. (co-editor with Frank C. Sharp) ISBN 978-1843836766
- Rossetti's Obsession: Images of Jane Morris. Bradford Museums and Galleries, 2014.
- The Illustrated Letters and Diaries of the Pre-Raphaelites. London: Batsford, 2018. (editor)
- Aubrey Beardsley: Decadence and Desire. London: Thames & Hudson, 2020.
- Elizabeth Siddal: Her Story. London: Pallas Athene, 2024.
