= Charles H. Bennett (illustrator) =

British illustrator (1828–1867)

- Born: 26 July 1828; Covent Garden, London, England
- Died: 2 April 1867
- Spouse: Elizabeth Toon

Charles Henry Bennett (26 July 1828 – 2 April 1867) was a British Victorian illustrator who pioneered techniques in comic illustration.

== Beginnings ==
Charles Henry Bennett was born at 3 Tavistock Row in Covent Garden on 26 July 1828 and was baptised a month later in St Paul's, Covent Garden. He was the eldest of the three children of Charles and Harriet Bennett, originally from Teston in Kent. His father was a boot-maker. Little is known of Charles' childhood, although some speculate that he received some education, possibly at St Clement Danes School.

At the age of twenty, Charles married Elizabeth Toon, the daughter of a Shoreditch warehouseman, on Christmas Day 1848, also in St. Paul's Church. Their first son, who they named after Charles, was born a year later and by 1851 the family was settled in Lyon's Inn in the Strand. At the time of their wedding, Charles was attempting to support his family by selling newspapers; however, in the 1851 census three years later he described himself as an artist and portrait painter.

By 1861, Charles and Elizabeth had six children and lived in Wimbledon. Charles, the eldest, was by this time at school, while the youngest, George, was just seven months old.

== Early career ==
As a child, Charles developed a passion for art, drawing for his inspiration the motley crowds he saw daily in the market. His father did not support Charles' artwork and considered it a waste of time.

As an adult, Charles became part of the London bohemian scene, and was a founder member of the Savage Club, each member of which was "a working man in literature or art". As well as socializing over convivial dinners, members of the club published a magazine called The Train. Charles Bennett contributed many illustrations, signed 'Bennett' rather than with his CHB monogram, but the magazine was short-lived.

The mid-nineteenth century saw the launch of many cheap, mostly short-lived periodicals in London, and Bennett contributed small illustrations to several, although it is difficult to identify some of his work because he didn't always sign them with his distinctive "CHB" monogram. Bennet is known to have contributed to The Devil in London, The Penny Trumpet, The Whig Dresser, The Squib, and The Man in the Moon. James Hannay, a novelist, journalist and protégé of Thackeray, founded Pasquin in 1847, followed by The Puppet Show in 1848 and The New Puppet Show in 1849. By 1855, Bennett was better known and was invited to design the masthead and front page cartoon for the first issue of the Comic Times. He also contributed to Diogenes (1855) and Comic News (1863-1865) as well as mainstream illustrated magazines such as The London Journal (1858), Good Words (1861), London Society (1862-1865), and Every Boy's Magazine (1864-1865). His occasional full-page illustrations (such as the page of characters from Twelfth Night) appeared in Christmas and New Year editions of The Illustrated London News.

== Children’s books ==
From The Adventures of Young Munchausen, 1865

1858 saw the publication of the first of more than a dozen children's books illustrated by Charles Bennett. Old Nurse's Book of Rhymes, Jingles & Ditties (1858) was a collection of children's verse with colour illustrations on every page and a frontispiece illustrating ‘Old Nurse at Home.’ Among the children's books that followed were Nine Lives of a Cat (1860) with twenty illustrated pages and The Adventurers of Young Munchausen (1863).

Bennett dedicated The Stories that Little Breeches Told (1863) to his daughters Harriet and Polly (Mary), with a suggestion that he was already ill, as follows:

DEAR HARRIET AND POLLY,
As soon as Little Breeches had told me these stories, I told them to you; but I am afraid I should soon have forgotten them, every one, if you had not so carefully treasured them up. Now when they are in print, and the pictures are all etched on copper-plates, I am made happy indeed, by your kindness in allowing me to dedicate them (in this new form) to you.
And remain,

All that is left of me,

Your affectionate Father,

CHARLES BENNETT

Charles H Bennett's signature

In addition to this dedication, the book has comments from family members after each story.

Similarly, The Sorrowful Ending of Noodledoo (1865) was dedicated to Bennett's son George, who had been ill, although "as he got better his temper fell sick." Lightsome and the Little Golden Lady (1866) also begins with a family dedication in which Charles thanks "my dear Charley" (by now 16) who had written down the story from his father's telling, a task which had given them both much enjoyment.

In addition to his own children's books, Charles Bennett provided the illustrations for Tom Hood's Jingles and Jokes for the Little Folks (1865) as well as for books of fairy tales by Henry Morley and Mark Lemon.

=== Shadows and Fables ===
A Queer Fish, from the Shadows series

Among Charles Bennett's best known and best loved books were his Shadows series. In Shadow and Substance (1860), Charles Bennett and Robert Barnabas Brough (with whom he had collaborated on the 1854 edition of Punch and Judy) describe a fictional magic lantern which they call the eidolograph. The shadows cast by the eidolograph indicate the true character and personality of the sitter; for example, a fat schoolboy's shadow is portrayed as a snail while Charles Bennett becomes an ass. The collection of shadow illustrations was reprinted several times in colour without the accompanying text and seems to have been something of a best seller. The shadow of a man leaning on a post shows him to be "A Queer Fish" and that of a young woman servant depicts a Black slave.

The Shadows illustrations first appeared in The Illustrated Times, which also published his weekly series of Studies in Darwinesque Development in 1863. These circular drawings, in which various animal species evolve into human beings, were published posthumously in the book Character Sketches, Development Drawings and Original Pictures of Wit and Humour in 1872.

The most reprinted of Charles Bennett's books has been his illustrated version of Aesop's Fables. First published in 1857, it has reappeared many times, most recently in 1978, with a French translation in 1979 (Le renard qui avait la queue coupée et autres fables adaptées et dessinées par Bennett).

== Pilgrim's Progress ==
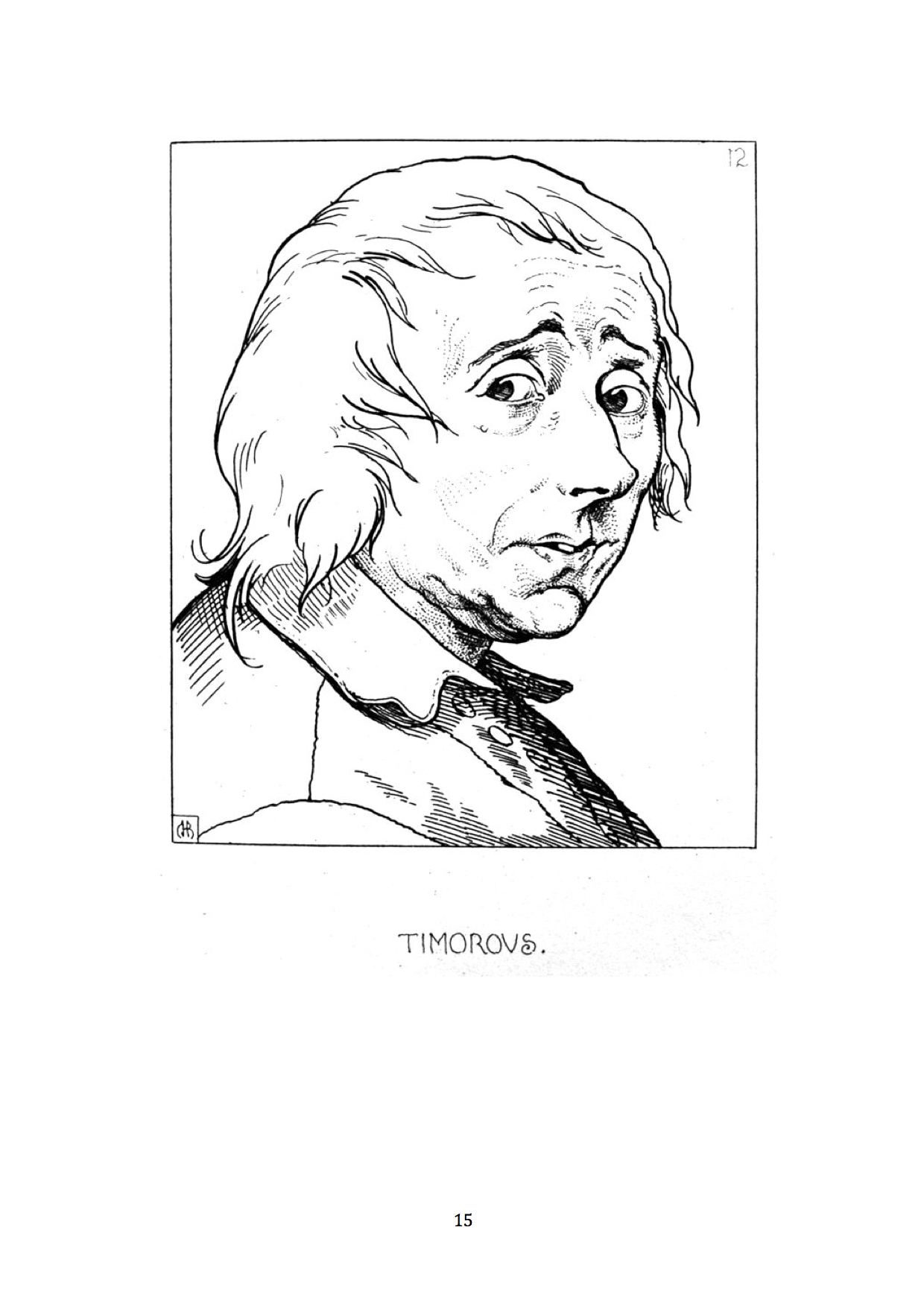
'Timorous', from Pilgrim's Progress

Towards the end of the 1850s, Charles Bennett prepared an illustrated version of Bunyan's Pilgrim's Progress, for which he produced more than 120 drawings, including sparely drawn caricatures of all the characters. At first he struggled to get this work published until it came to the attention of Charles Kingsley, who provided a preface for the book, after which Longman accepted it for publication. In his letter to Charles Bennett, Kingsley agreed that an appropriately illustrated version of the book was needed and offered his views on the style to be used. He cautioned against imaginative freedom at the cost of beauty of form and pointed to a strong German element in Bunyan, which should be expressed by a tendency to the grotesque. He concludes the letter by urging the artist to put the visions on paper as they appeared to the mind of the seer himself. "Now we know that Bunyan saw these people in his mind's eye, as dressed in the garb of his own century. It is very graceful and I should keep to it, not only for historic truth's sake, but because in no other way can you express Bunyan's leading idea, that the same supernatural world which was close to old prophets and martyrs was close to him; that the devil who whispered in the ears of Judas, whispered in the ears of a cavalier over his dice, or a Presbyterian minister in his Geneva gown." Perhaps feeling that he was being too prescriptive, Kingsley concluded, "Take these hints as meant, kindly."

Charles Bennett added a small illustration at the end of the preface showing the writer (Kingsley) helping the artist (Bennett) up the hill of fame. The two became friends and Charles Bennett visited Kingsley at home in Eversley, where he was the rector, returning home with gifts for Elizabeth from Mrs. Kingsley.

His other two serious books from this period were Quarles’ Emblems (1861) and London People: Sketched from Life (1863). Francis Quarles was a seventeenth century poet who was a cupbearer to the future Queen Elizabeth and subsequently secretary to James Usher, the primate of all Ireland, who was best known for his biblical chronology which claimed to establish the date of creation as the night preceding Sunday, 23 October 4004 BC. Quarles' Emblems (originally published in 1635) consisted of a series of paraphrases from the Bible expressed in ornate and metaphorical language, each concluding with an epigram of four lines. Originally popular, Emblems was panned by 17th and 18th century critics but the publication of a new edition illustrated by Charles Bennett and W Harry Rogers indicated that it may still have been popular in the 1800s.

London People:Sketched from Life contains some of Charles Bennett's best illustrations. Co-authored with John Hollingshead, the book brings together sketches from The Cornhill Magazine, "designed to exhibit faithful delineations of physiognomies characteristic of different classes of LONDON PEOPLE as they appear, not aiming at humorous exaggeration on the one hand or ideal grace on the other.

In 1865, Charles Bennett contributed a frontispiece and three illustrations to The Reverend John Allan's temperance tale, John Todd and How He Stirred His Own Broth-pot.

== The Punch years ==
Charles Henry Bennett's distinctive monogram

Charles Bennett’s drawings appeared in Punch from time to time and in 1865 he was invited to join the Punch Council, which included Mark Lemon (Editor), Shirley Brooks and John Tenniel. By March 1866 Charles was a regular attendee and another member of the Council, Henry Silver, recorded in his diaries some of Charles Bennett’s contributions to discussion and reported that he was deaf in his right ear and smoked cigars. Silver also mentions that Charles was left handed although he sometimes drew with his right hand. In a discussion of recurring nightmares, Shirley Brooks’ was swimming in a sea of butter, while Charles Bennett described how he had to tie up a parcel but was unable to find a piece of string the right length, despite cutting a hundred bits.

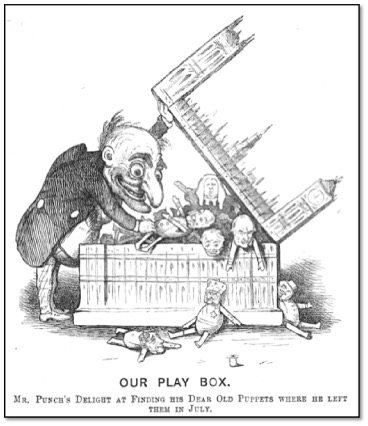
Parliament as a toy box, 1865

His regular contributions began in February 1865 at the beginning of a new parliamentary session with a cartoon of Mr. Punch opening parliament. Over the next two years he contributed nearly 200 drawings signed with his characteristic CHB monogram. He specialised in very elaborate initial letters, such as the letter Z at the beginning of Punch's Essence of Parliament in April 1866. He occasionally contributed political cartoons, and in September 1866 he depicted the Pope as a turnip propped up by a musket, about to be knocked away by Napoleon III. Charles Bennett's bohemian appearance, apparently the result of his financial straits, seems to have been the cause of comment even around the Punch table. In October 1866, therefore, the Council passed the following resolution:

Resolved

• That this meeting deeply sympathises with C. H. Bennett on the state of his hair

• That this meeting appreciates the feeling which detains the said Bennett from the Council until his hair shall have been cut

• That this meeting deplores the impecuniosity which prevents the said Bennett from attending a barber

• That this meeting, anxious to receive the said Bennett to its bosom once again, organizes a subscription to enable him to attend the said barber

• That this meeting, having (limited) confidence in Mr. Mark Lemon, entrusts him with the following subscriptions in aid of the above object, and requests him to communicate with the aforesaid Bennett, to the end that he may have his damn hair cut, and rejoin the assembly of the brethren.

This resolution was signed by ten members of the Council, who each contributed one penny by attaching a penny red stamp to the letter. It seems unlikely that the state of his hair was the true reason for Charles's absence from Council meetings, it being more likely that his deteriorating health was already keeping him away. His final attendance at the table was apparently on 12 December 1866 and Henry Silver recorded his absence the following week, but made no further reference to his subsequent presence.

== Later life and death ==
By the beginning of 1867, Charles and Elizabeth were living in Caversham Road, Kentish Town. His health was failing and his final cartoon appeared in Punch on 23 March. Shirley Brooks visited him on 31 March, recording in his diary: "Went off to enquire about Bennett, who has just got into a new house in the Kentish Town wilds ... Never having been in the region, I managed to forget the directions of the map and found myself in the Holloway Road, but soon worked my way round to the spot, which is pleasant enough. Saw his son only, a very nice boy, who said Bennett was "a little better"."

Charles Bennett died on 2 April 1867 between eight and nine in the morning. His death certificate recorded the cause of death as neuralgia and atrophy (although his widow subsequently asserted that he had died of consumption) and his occupation was given as "Draftsman on wood." Brooks recorded in his diary: "I am very sorry. Bennett was a man one could not help loving for his gentleness. Such a wonderful artist", and Henry Silver wrote the following day: "Intelligence of poor Bennett’s death yesterday. So we didn’t dine." An obituary appeared in Punch on 13 April.

Charles Bennett was buried in Brompton Cemetery on 8 April. His wife and one of his sons were later buried in the same grave. Two days later the Punch Council discussed the needs of his widow, Elizabeth, with eight children and another on the way, "although no debts." Because of his long illness, his life had been too hazardous for insurance. They agreed that there was a case for a public appeal and that they would press their private channels as well. The published appeal, over the names of Charles Kingsley, Mark Lemon and John Everett Millais as well as Brooks himself, was distributed widely and appeared as a letter in the Times. With the help of Charles's friends at Punch, his widow also approached the Artists’ Benevolent Institution and the Royal Literary Fund. The Punch Council solicited donations through advertisements and personal contacts and decided to stage a benefit performance for the family. The Adelphi Theatre in London was duly booked for the afternoon of Saturday, 11 May 1867, five weeks after Charles Bennett's death. The afternoon included the first public performance of Cox and Box, Arthur Sullivan's first opera, given by the Moray Minstrels, along with performances by Kate Terry, Florence Terry and Ellen Terry and others. The afternoon was a success and another benefit performance was arranged in Manchester at the end of July. There is no record of the total amount raised for his family, but by the time of the 1871 census Elizabeth (who described herself as an "Annuitand") and the children were living in Gainford Road, Kentish Town. In 1881 she claimed to have "Means derived from dividends"’ despite having considered taking lodgers at the time of Charles’s death.

== Personality ==
In his obituary of Charles Bennett for Punch, Shirley Brooks records that "he was a very able colleague, a very dear friend. None of our fellow−workers ever entered more heartily into his work, or laboured with more earnestness to promote our general purpose. His facile execution and singular subtlety of fancy were, we hoped, destined to enrich these pages for many a year. It has been willed otherwise, and we lament the loss of a comrade of invaluable skill." The reference to his "earnestness" contrasts with his nickname of "Cheerful Charley" and his reputation as an eccentric bohemian. In the History of Punch, M H Spielmann reports that, in the words of Augustus Sala, Charles Bennett was "sober, industrious, and upright, and scarcely a Bohemian; but throughout his short life he was ‘Murad the unlucky'." The Dalziel brothers, noted 19th century engravers, also described him as an "earnest man concerning his work … time should never be allowed to enter into the question; the task should be defined but never trammelled by 'How long will it take?'" His prodigious output - well over 1000 illustrations in his short working life - is an indicator of how hard he worked and suggests an earnest approach to every project. A fuller description of his nature appeared nearly thirty years after his death in The Magazine of Art (1895), where M H Spielmann described him as "one of the best known, and most keenly appreciated amongst the humorous artists of the century." Spielmann asserted that his nature "was largely made up of that love & pity, of that breadth of sympathy and depth of emotion which are to be found in the heart of all true humourists. He was, moreover, a man of deep religious thought, profoundly moved by the love of children; and accordingly religion and childhood inspired much of his art and produced most of his happiest works. The strength of the man’s nature, too, declared itself in its technique, which, however halting at the beginning, was always firm in touch and resolute in design; and to these qualities he owes it that we forgive much of the obvious lack of training with which his earlier work was tainted."

Charles Bennet loved children, and his children's books were filled with family dedications and references, and many of the ideas in the books came from morning walks in Wimbledon with his children. He considered walking a profitable pastime and would trudge for miles thinking up new characters and imagining fresh faces. The same Magazine of Art article asserts that "most of the roads of Kent knew him as a familiar figure, and Canterbury, Ashford & Maidstone were his constant goal when he started, knapsack on back, with no other companion than his sketchbook, pipe & stick." Opinions of his work vary, from those who consider Charles Bennett to have been among the leading illustrators of the 19th century to other critics who found his drawings outdated and over-characterised. It is clear, however, from the few written observations that survive, that he was affectionately respected by colleagues and revelled in his family life, telling stories to his children and illustrating them for publication. He combined an earnest single-mindedness in his work with a cheerful and sympathetic manner, which justified the assertion in the Punch obituary that Charles Bennett was "one of the kindliest and gentlest of our associates, the power of whose hand was equalled by the goodness of his heart."

== Bibliography ==
=== Illustrated books by Charles H Bennett ===
- Fables of Aesop (1857)
- Old Nurse's Book of Rhymes, Jingles and Ditties (1858)
- The Faithless Parrot (1858)
- Birds, Beasts and Fishes (1859)
- Proverbs with Pictures (1859)
- The Nine Lives of a Cat (1860)
- Little Breeches (1863)
- The Book of Blockheads (1863)
- Nursery Fun: the Little Folks’ Picture Book (1863)
- The Frog who Would A-Wooing Go (1864)
- The Sorrowful Ending of Noodledoo (1865)
- The Adventures of Young Munchausen (1865)
- The Sad History of Greedy Jem (1865)
- Lightsome and the Little Golden Lady (1867)
- Mr. Wind and Madam Rain (1867)

=== Other books illustrated by Charles H Bennett ===
- The Wonderful Drama of Punch and Judy (1854)
- Umbrellas and Their History (1855)
- John Cargill Brough's The Fairy Tales of Science (1859)
- Pilgrim's Progress (1860)
- Shadow and Substance (1860)
- Henry Morley's Fables and Fairy Tales (1860)
- Games of Skill and Conjuring (1861)
- Henry Morley's Oberon's Horn (1861)
- Francis Quarles' Emblems (1861)
- W. H. Wills' Poets' Wit and Humour (1861)
- London People: Sketched from Life (1863)
- Darcy W Thompson's Nursery Nonsense (1864)
- John Allan's John Todd & How He Stirred His Own Broth-pot (1864)
- Darcy W Thompson's Fun and Earnest (1865)
- Tom Hood's Jingles and Jokes for the Little Folks (1865)
- Henry Morley's The Chicken Market and other stories (1866)
- Mark Lemon's Fairy Tales (1866)
- Mark Lemon's The Chronicles of the Three Sisters (1866)
- Character Sketches, Development Drawings ... (1872)

=== Magazine contributions ===
- Comic News
- Comic Times
- Diogenes
- Every Boy's Magazine
- Good Words
- Illustrated London News
- Illustrated Times
- London Society
- Punch
- Punchinello
- The London Journal
- The New Puppet Show
- The Penny Illustrated Paper
- The Puppet Show
- The Train (magazine)

=== Further reading ===
- Blanchard, E.L. (1891) Theatrical Obituaries from 1844 to 1889
- Briggs, Julia, et al. (2008) Popular Children's Literature in Britain
- Everitt, Graham (1893) English Caricaturists and Graphic Humourists of the Nineteenth Century
- Kingsley, Mary Lucas (Ed) (1890) Charles Kingsley, His Letters and Memories of His Life
- Layard, G.S. (1907) Shirley Brooks of Punch
- Oxford Dictionary of National Biography, Charles H Bennett
- Quarles, Francis; Rogers, William Harry; Swain, Joseph; Charles Henry Bennett; Edmund Evans (1861). Quarles' emblems. James Nisbet and co.
- Ray, Gordon Norton (1992) The Illustrator and the Book in England from 1790 to 1914
- Silver, Henry (1858-1870) Diary
- Smith, Jonathan (2006) Charles Darwin and Victorian Culture
- Solly, Henry Shaen (1898) The Life of Henry Morley Ll.D
- Spielmann, M.H. (1895) The Artistic Works of Charles Bennett, The Magazine of Art, October 1895
- Spielmann, M.H. (1895) The History of Punch
- Strauss, Gustave (1883) Reminiscences of an Old Bohemian
- Swain, Joseph (1888) Charles Henry Bennett Good Words XXIX 589
- Worth, George J (1964) James Hannay: His Life and Works

== Further bibliography ==
- Papernose Woodensconce. 1854
- The Fables of Aesop and Others, Translated into Human Nature. W. Kent & Co., 1857.
- The Faithless Parrot, Routledge, 1858.
- The sad history of Greedy Jem and all his little brothers, 1858.
- The Nine Lives of a Cat, Griffith and Farran, 1860 (Note: Can be viewed online at the Baldwin Library of Historical Children's Literature in the Department of Special Collections and Area Studies, George A. Smathers Libraries, University of Florida.)
- Mr. Wind and Madame Rain, 1864.
- "Hair-Dressing by Electricity". Punch, 1866.
- The origin of species, dedicated by natural selection to Dr. Charles Darwin (caricatures series, included in Character Sketches and Development Drawings, 1872) (Note: Can be viewed online at Mary Evans Picture Library)
- Aesop's Fables and Others, Designed and Drawn on Wood by Charles H. Bennett, with Additional Fables Designed and Drawn by Randolph Caldecott. London: Bracken Books, 1986.
