= Peter Funnell =

Peter Funnell is Curator of Nineteenth-Century Portraits and Head of Research Programmes at the National Portrait Gallery, London.

Funnell studied English and the History of Art at University College London and completed his doctorate in the History of Art at Oxford University.

== Selected publications ==
- Millais: Portraits, co-authored with Malcolm Warner, exhibition catalogue, National Portrait Gallery, London, 1999.
- Thomas Lawrence: Regency Power and Brilliance. Yale University Press, 2010. (with A Cassandra Albinson and Lucy Peltz)
- "Portraits, Power and Gender" in Portraits and Power, People, Politics and Structures. Firenze: Fondazione Palazzo Strozzi, 2010.
- A Guide to Victorian and Edwardian Portraits. London: National Portrait Gallery in association with the National Trust, 2011. (With Jan Marsh)
