= The Illustrated Times Weekly Newspaper =

British newspaper

- Categories: Victorian art
- Frequency: Weekly
- First issue: 1855
- Final issue: 2 March 1872
- Country: United Kingdom
- Based in: London

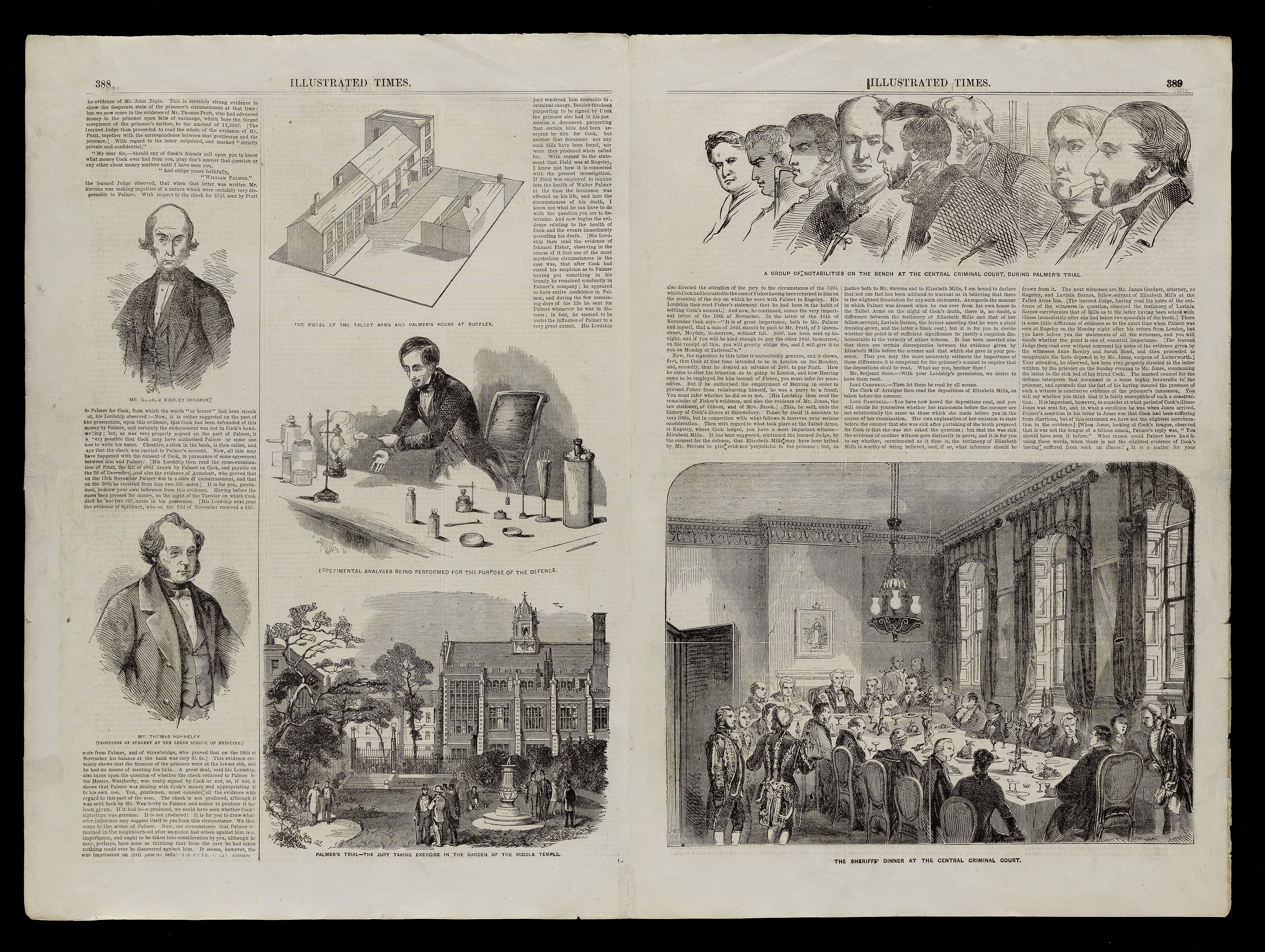
Double-page feature on the trial of William Palmer, Illustrated Times, 27 May 1856

The Illustrated Times Weekly Newspaper was a British newspaper and rival to The Illustrated London News published between 1855 and 1872. The publisher was the Fleet Street bookseller David Bogue and the editor was Henry Vizetelly.

== Origins ==
Henry Vizetelly had been part of the campaign in the 1850s for the repeal of the Stamp Act. Believing that success was imminent, he conceived of the idea of bringing out a cheap popular illustrated paper to compete with the near monopoly of Herbert Ingram's Illustrated London News with himself as editor. All the plans were laid accordingly; but the passing of the repeal bill was unexpectedly delayed. Vizetelly decided upon a bold course. His advertisements had been issued, and he did not wish to break faith with the public. Accordingly, on the day appointed (9 June 1855), the first number of the new paper duly appeared. For weeks it continued to be published without the stamp. The authorities barked loudly, but they did not bite. Vizetelly was served with a writ for a £12,000 penalty, but the proceedings were dropped.

== Success ==
The absence of the tax stamp allowed the new paper to be published at the low price of twopence and it became a rapid success. It was well illustrated, well written, and energetically conducted. The office was at 2 Catherine Street, Strand, on a site subsequently covered by the Gaiety Theatre and Restaurant. Among the artists who worked for the paper were Julian Portch, an excellent all-round draughtsman who was especially good at battle-scenes, Edouard Monn, Gustave Doré, H. Valentine, Gustave Janet, A.J. Palmer, Kenny Meadows, Harrison Weir, G. Cruikshank, Myles Birket Foster, Charles Henry Bennett, and W. McConnell.

== Last issue ==
The last issue appeared on 2 March 1872.
