= Government Art Collection =

Art collection of the British government

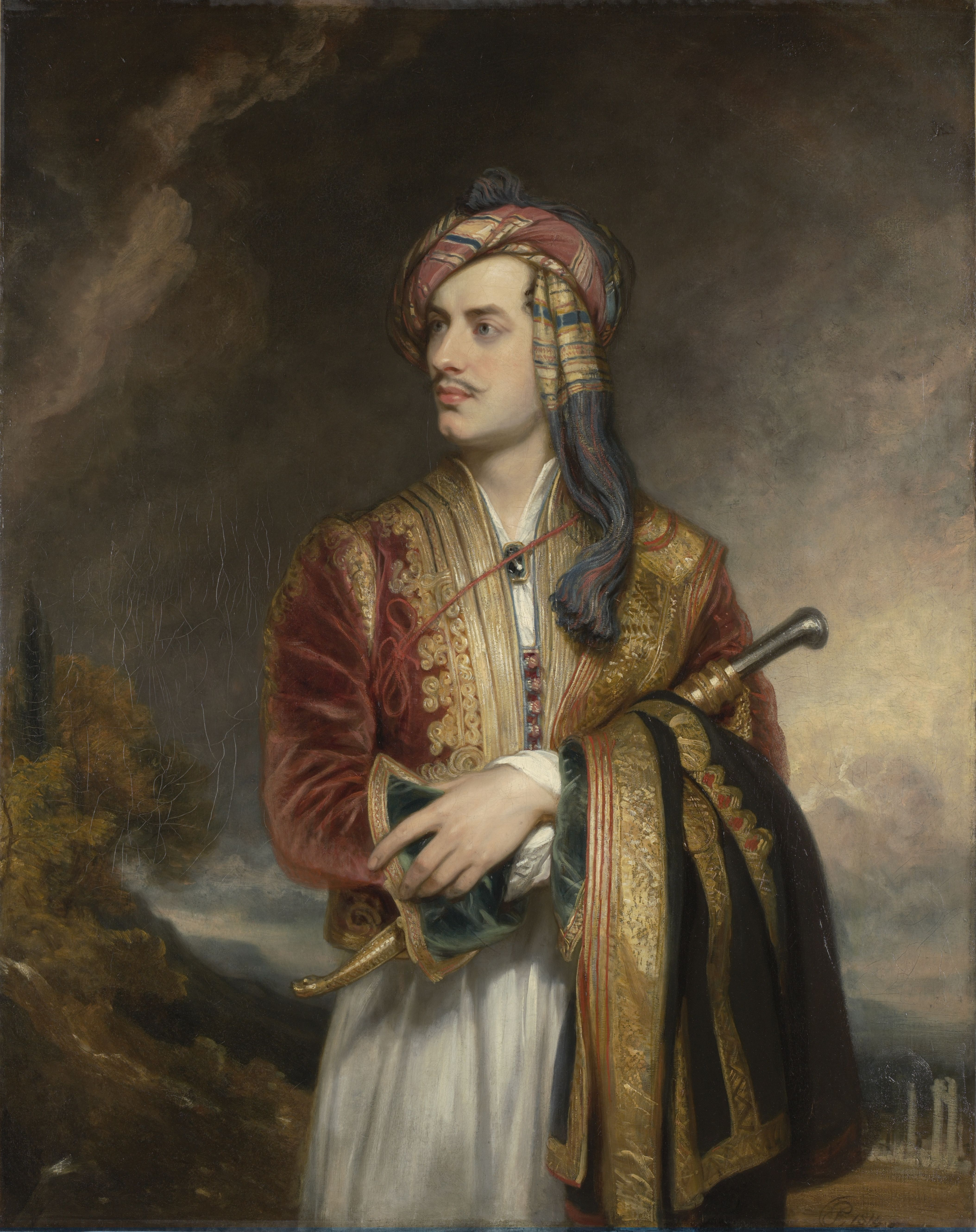
Lord Byron in Albanian Dress by Thomas Phillips, 1813, one of the works of art held by the Government Art Collection, has been displayed in Venizelos Mansion in Athens, the residence of the British Ambassador to Greece, for several decades

The Government Art Collection (GAC) is the collection of artworks owned by the UK government and administered by the Department for Culture, Media and Sport (DCMS). The GAC's artworks are used to decorate major government buildings in the UK and around the world, and to promote British art, culture and history. The GAC now holds over 14,000 works of art in a variety of media, including around 2,500 oil paintings, but also sculpture, prints, drawings, photographs, textiles and video works, mainly created by British artists or artist with a strong connection to the UK, from the sixteenth century to the present day. Works are displayed in several hundred locations, including Downing Street, ministerial offices and reception areas in Whitehall, regional government offices in the UK, and diplomatic posts outside the UK.

== History ==
The GAC dates its establishment to 5 December 1899, when Reginald Brett, 2nd Viscount Esher, Permanent Secretary to the Office of Works, wrote to Sir Francis Mowatt, Permanent Secretary to the Treasury, proposing to spend £150 to acquire five paintings for the Foreign Office, arguing that the expenditure would save a greater amount of money that would otherwise be spent on decorations. Up to the late 19th century, government ministers and ambassadors could decorate their rooms with their own personal art collections, but the GAC became more important as the social background of people holding government posts changed into the 20th century meant that could no longer be expected.

In 1935, an annual "picture fund" of £250 was authorised by HM Treasury to buy artworks to decorate diplomatic posts outside the UK, with advice from an "Overseas Picture Committee" including the directors of the major public London collections at the National Gallery, London, the Tate Gallery, and the National Portrait Gallery. Initially, most of the works it acquired were historical portraits, such as portraits of Charles II by Thomas Hawker, and of James II by Godfrey Kneller. As well as buying works, the GAC has also received many significant donations, some directly from the artist.

The first curator of the collection, Richard Perry Bedford, was appointed in 1946; he was succeeded in 1949 by Richard Walker, who served until 1976, and expanded the collection from several hundred to over 8,000 works. The GAC expanded its remit to include more modern works: its first work by a living artist was Ripe Corn by John Nash, acquired in the 1940s; and John Piper was commissioned to create new works for the British embassy in Rio de Janeiro in 1949. By the 1970s, the GAC's modern artworks outnumbered the historical works.

Dr Wendy Baron served as the director of the GAC from 1978 to 1997, and then Penny Johnson. The collection was named the "Government Art Collection" in 1981.

Other government bodies hold their own collections, distinct from the GAC. For example, the Ministry of Defence (MoD) had a separate art collection, which was dispersed to other public galleries and collections, including some to the GAC, in 2017.

== Collection ==
The collection includes works by many well-known British artists of the 17th and 18th centuries, including works by or after Peter Lely, Godfrey Kneller, James Thornhill, William Hogarth and John Constable, Victorian artists such as William Powell Frith, Lucien Pissarro and James Sant, 20th century artists such as John Nash and Paul Nash, Laura Knight, L.S. Lowry, Barbara Hepworth, Bridget Riley, Lucian Freud, Peter Blake, Eduardo Paolozzi, David Hockney and Elisabeth Frink, and more contemporary artists such as Emma Kay, Zarina Bhimji, Yinka Shonibare, Michael Landy, Grayson Perry, Chris Ofili, Lubaina Himid, Rachel Whiteread, Damien Hirst, Tracey Emin, Martin Creed, David Nash, Hurvin Anderson, David Remfry, Chantal Joffe and Denzil Forrester. The oldest work is a portrait of Henry VIII dated to between 1527 and 1550. The collection also includes prints of cartoons by artists such as James Gillray, George Cruikshank and Victor Weisz, and Punch magazine caricatures by Carlo Pellegrini ("Ape") and Sir Leslie Ward ("Spy").

Around two-thirds of the collection is on display in government buildings, with some items loaned for exhibitions, and the remainder at its premises in central London for conservation or awaiting re-display. Until 2020, the main premises were in Queen's Yard off Tottenham Court Road, but there were plans to move to new premises in Whitehall in 2020. Wherever possible, the GAC lends works of art to exhibitions in public museums and galleries throughout the UK and abroad. The GAC also collaborates with other departments, such as the Home Office and the Foreign and Commonwealth Office, in commissioning new works of art. The GAC has two casts of a bust of Winston Churchill, by Jacob Epstein, one of which has been loaned to the White House twice.

At the Home Office building in central London, the GAC commissioned a programme of public art by seven contemporary artists, and new commissions for its interior spaces. In 2005, new works of art were commissioned for the Deputy High Commissioner's offices in Chennai (formerly Madras); and for the European Commission Office at Brussels. Commissions were completed in the DCMS between 2006 and 2007 and at the Ministry of Justice (previously Department for Constitutional Affairs) in 2009 and in London.

Works of art continue to be added to the collection. In 2008, the GAC received £551,000 each year from the government, a sum that includes an acquisition budget of £220,000.

== Advisory Committee ==
Purchases and commissions are made with the support and agreement of the Advisory Committee on the Government Art Collection, whose members are appointed by the Secretary of State for Digital, Culture, Media and Sport. The Advisory Committee is currently chaired by Sir David Verey and comprises five ex officio members (the Directors of the National, National Portrait and Tate Galleries, as well as the Director of the GAC and a senior civil servant from the DCMS), together with several additional independent members.

Examples of works from the GAC

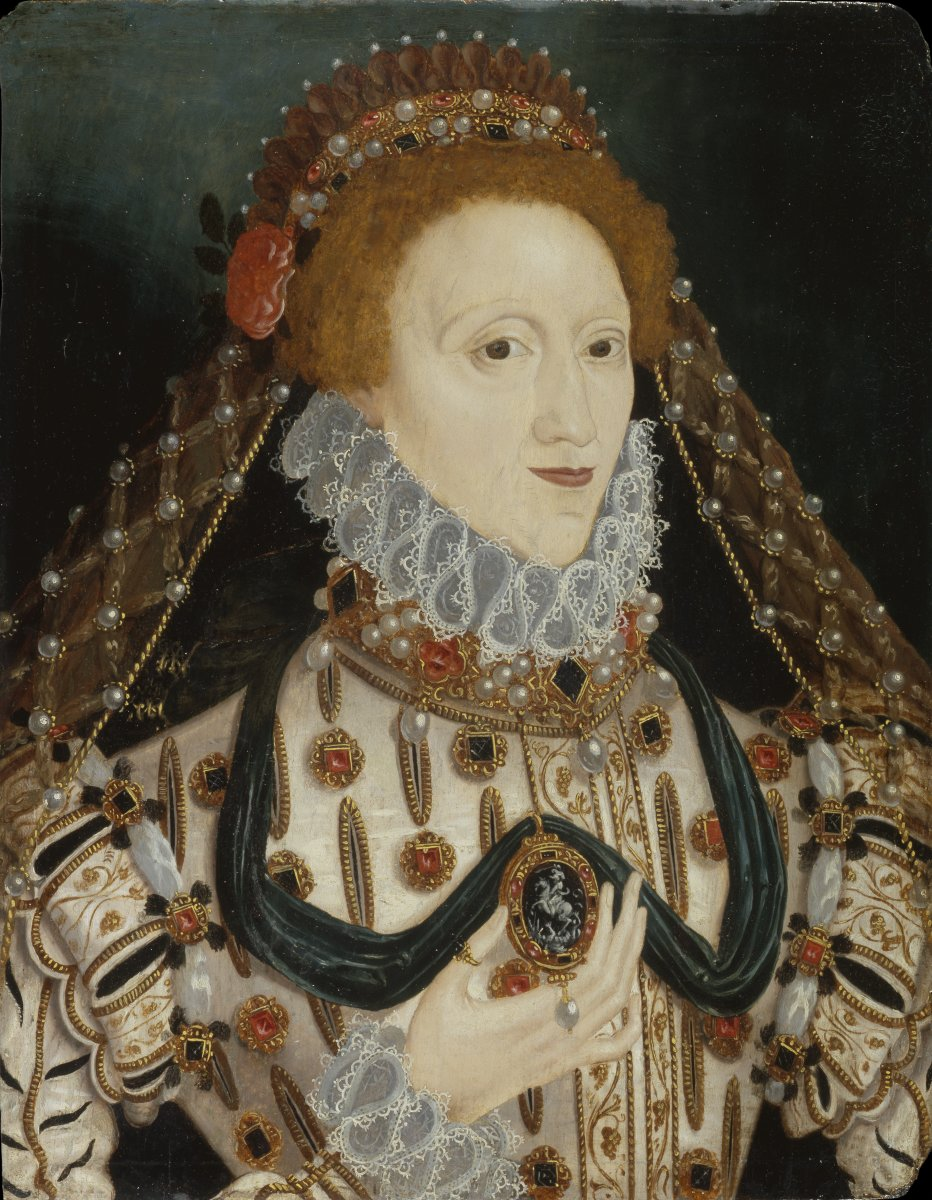
Portrait of Elizabeth I, c.1585-1595, in the British Embassy in Washington, D.C.

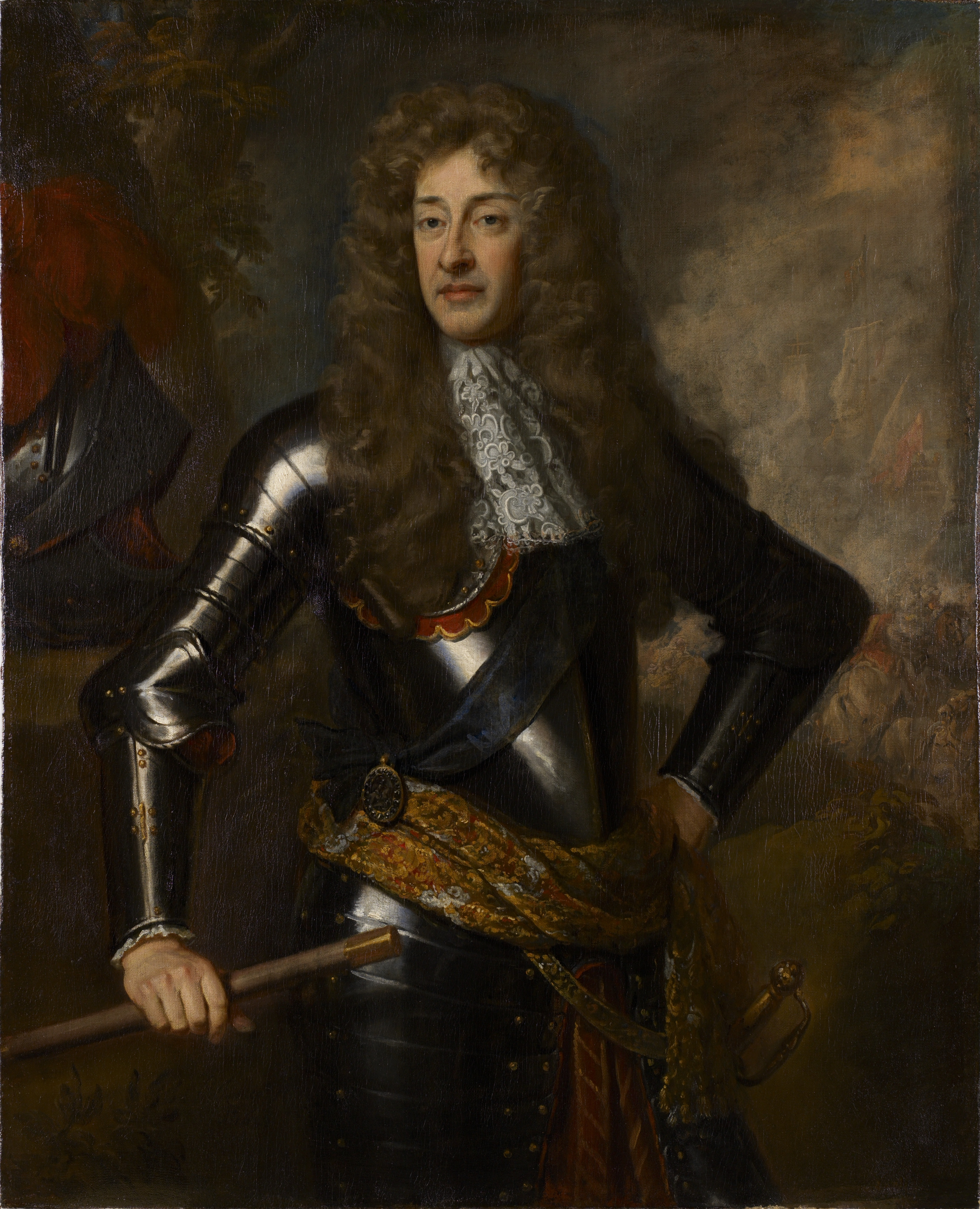
Portrait of James II by Godfrey Kneller, 1683, in the British Embassy in The Hague

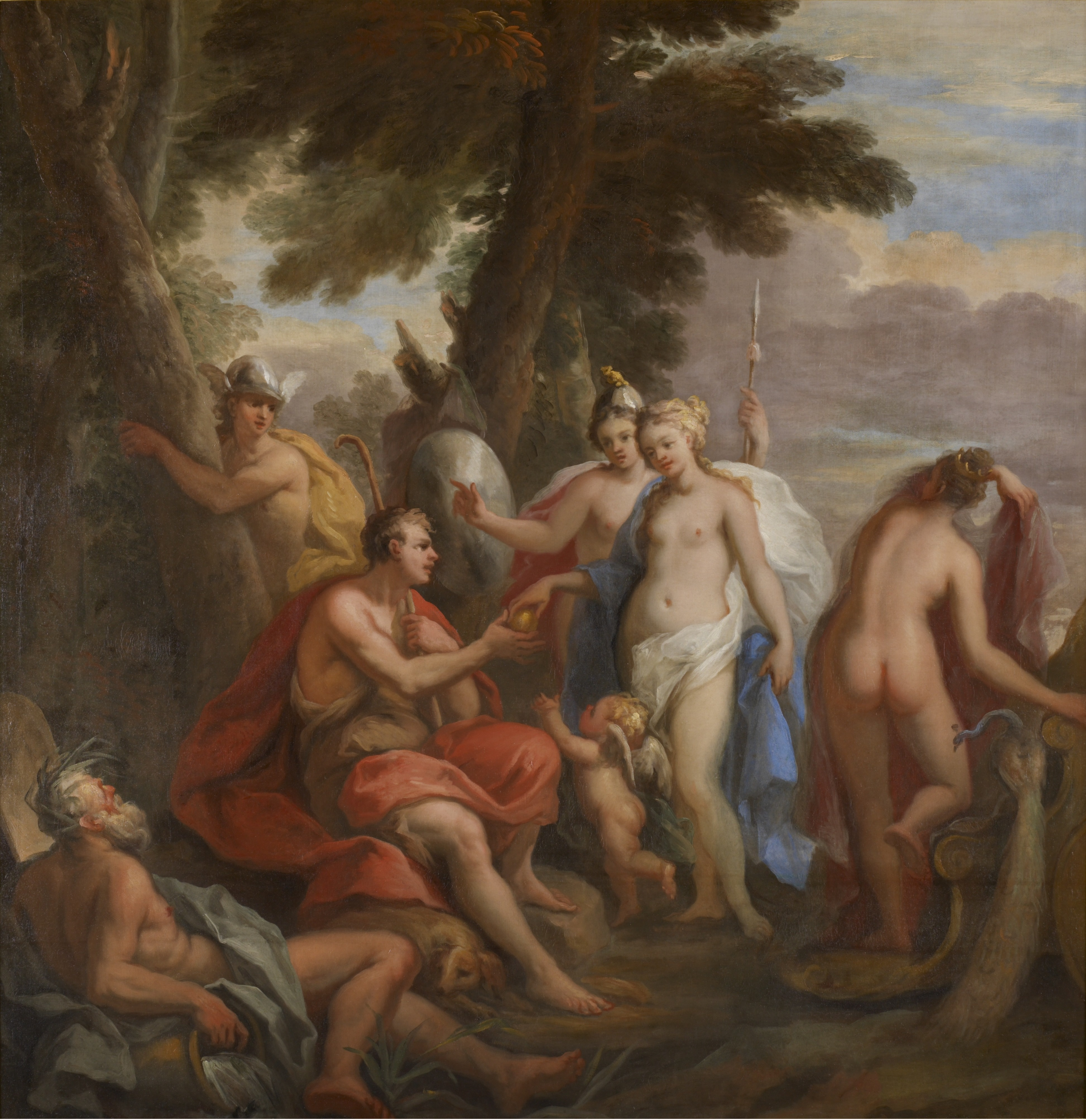
The Judgement of Paris by James Thornhill, 1704–1705, at Lancaster House

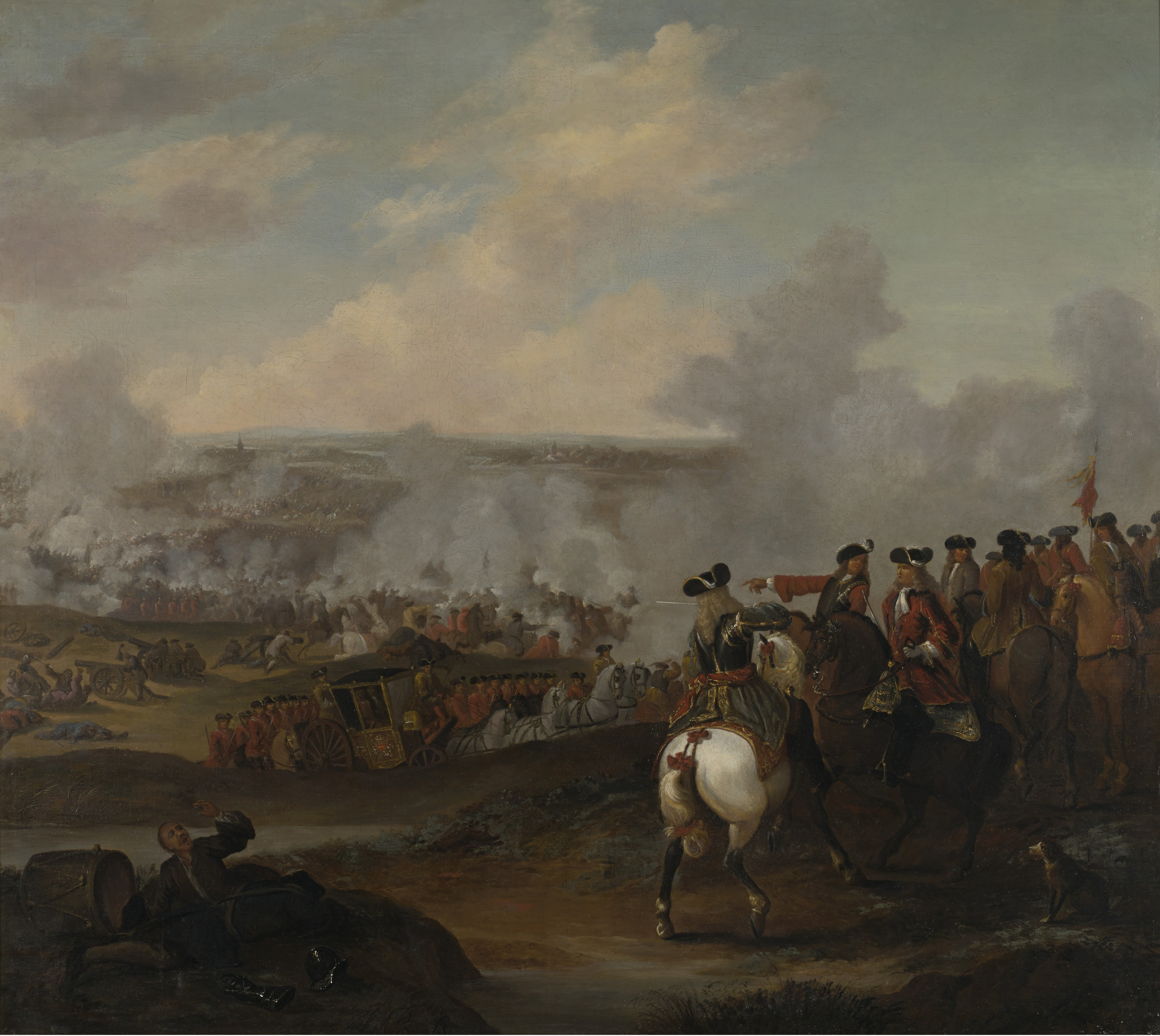
Battle of Blenheim by Joshua Ross, 1715, at the Cabinet Office

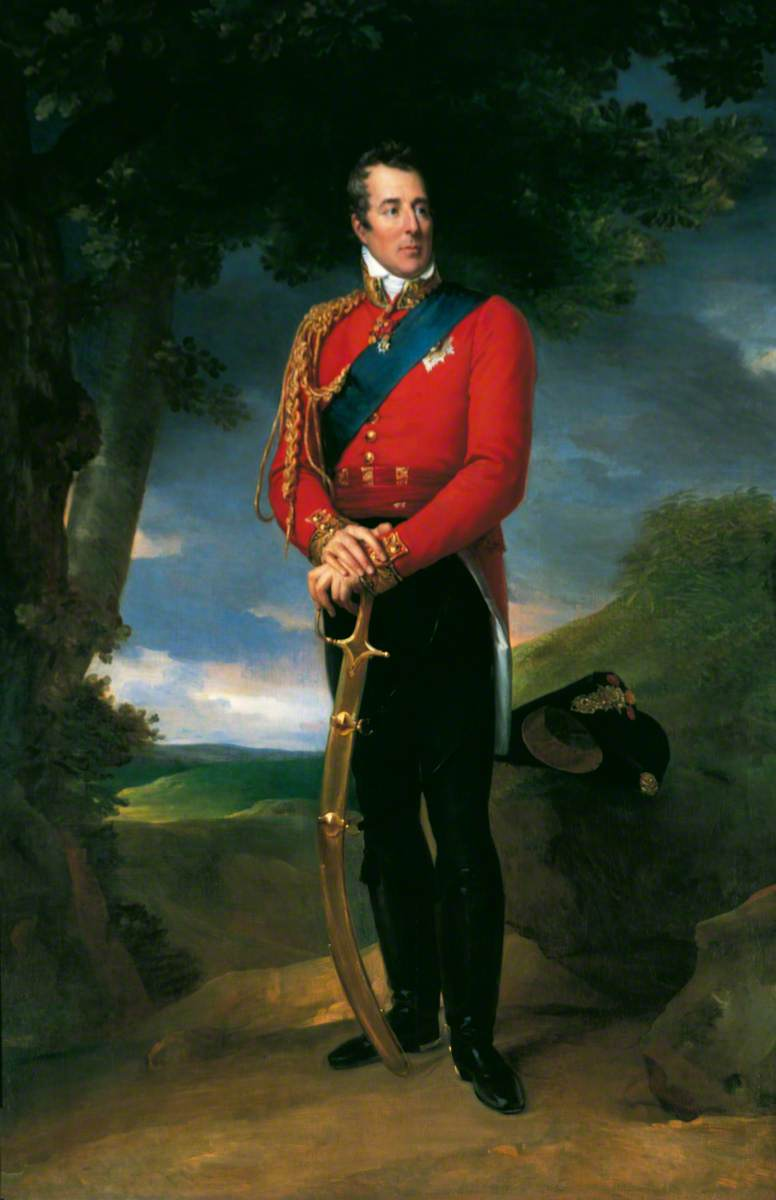
Portrait of the Duke of Wellington by François Gérard, 1814, in the British Embassy in Paris

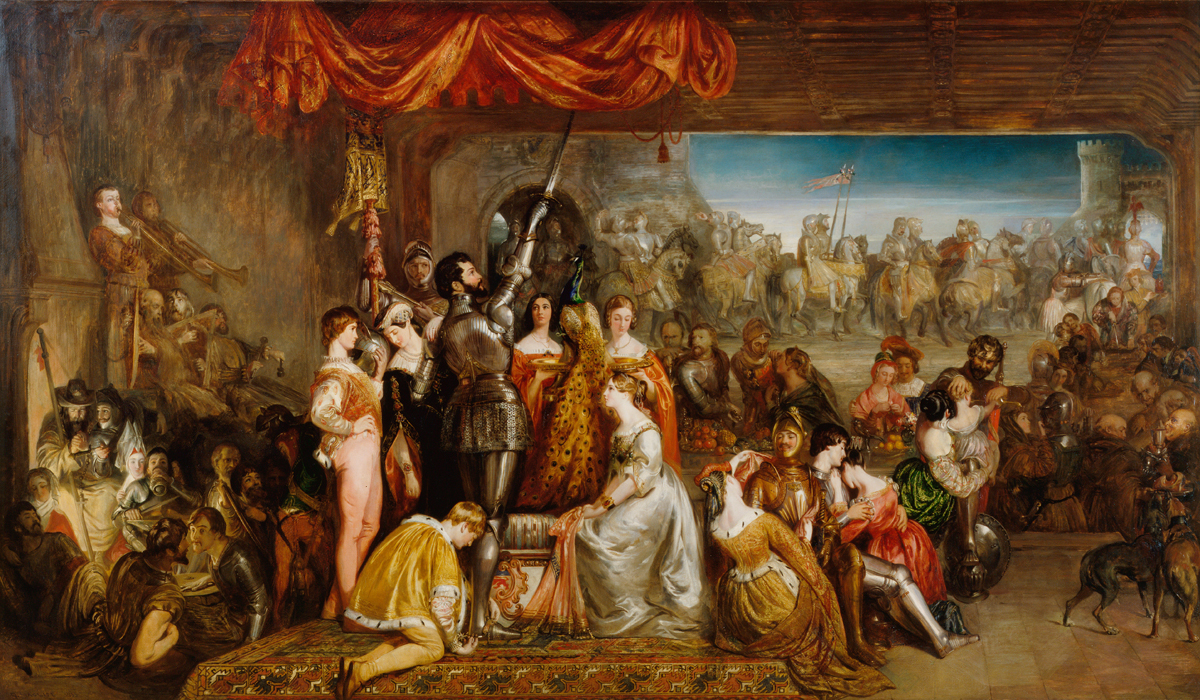
The Chivalric Vow of the Ladies of the Peacock by Daniel Maclise, 1835

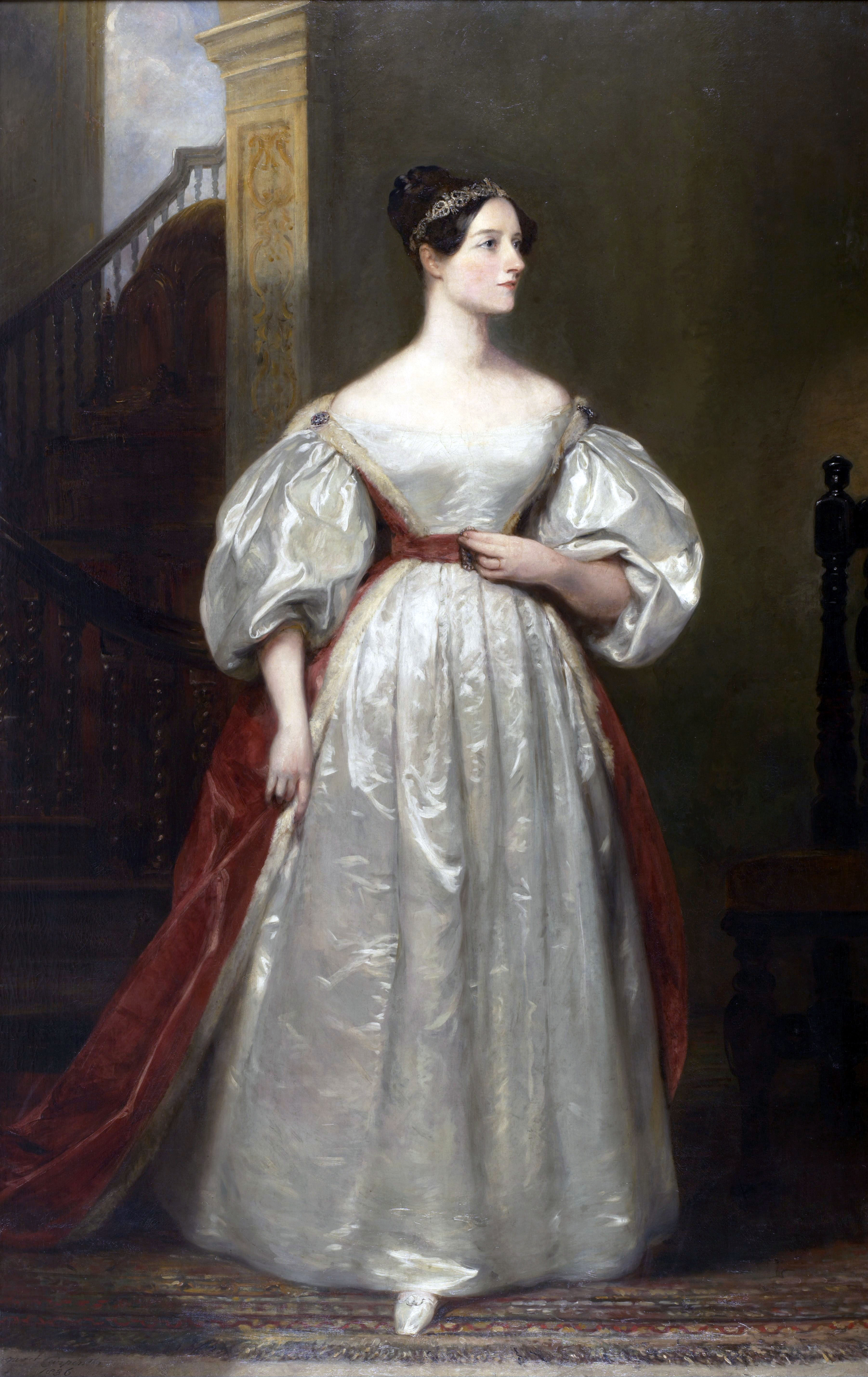
Portrait of Ada Lovelace by Margaret Sarah Carpenter, 1836, in Downing Street

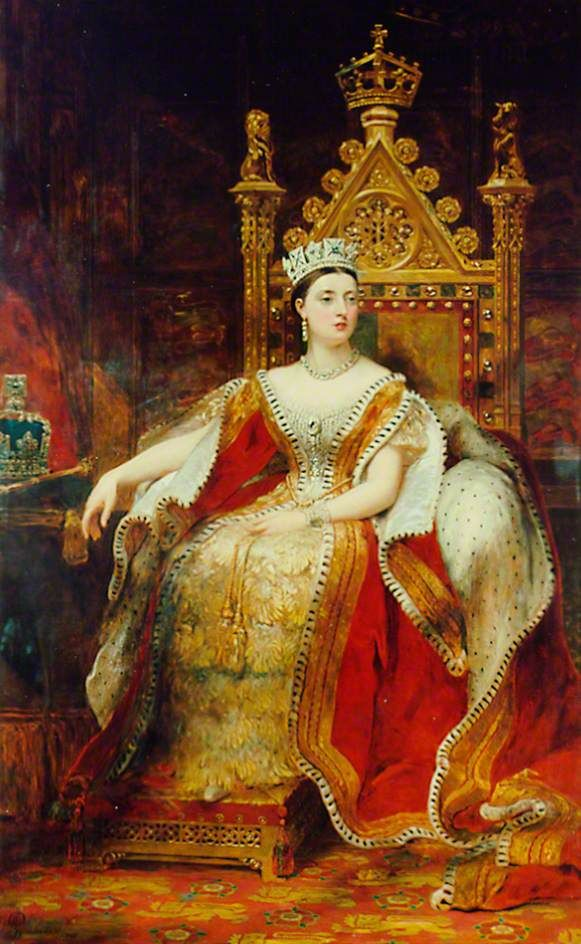
Queen Victoria (1819-1901) Reigned 1837-1901, by James Sant, 1876, at Palace of Westminster

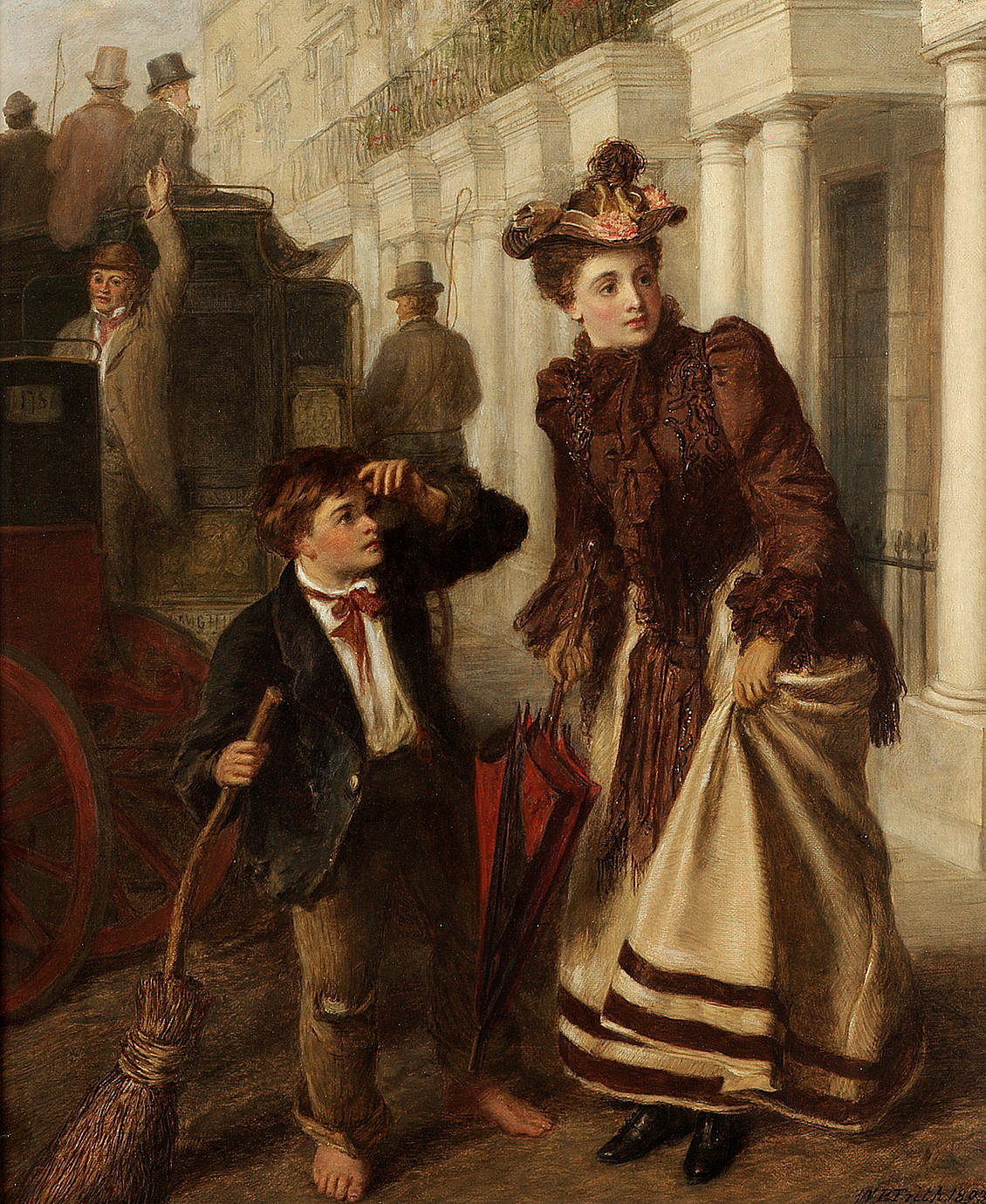
Updated version of The Crossing Sweeper by William Powell Frith, 1893, in storage

The Integrity of Belgium by Walter Sickert, 1914

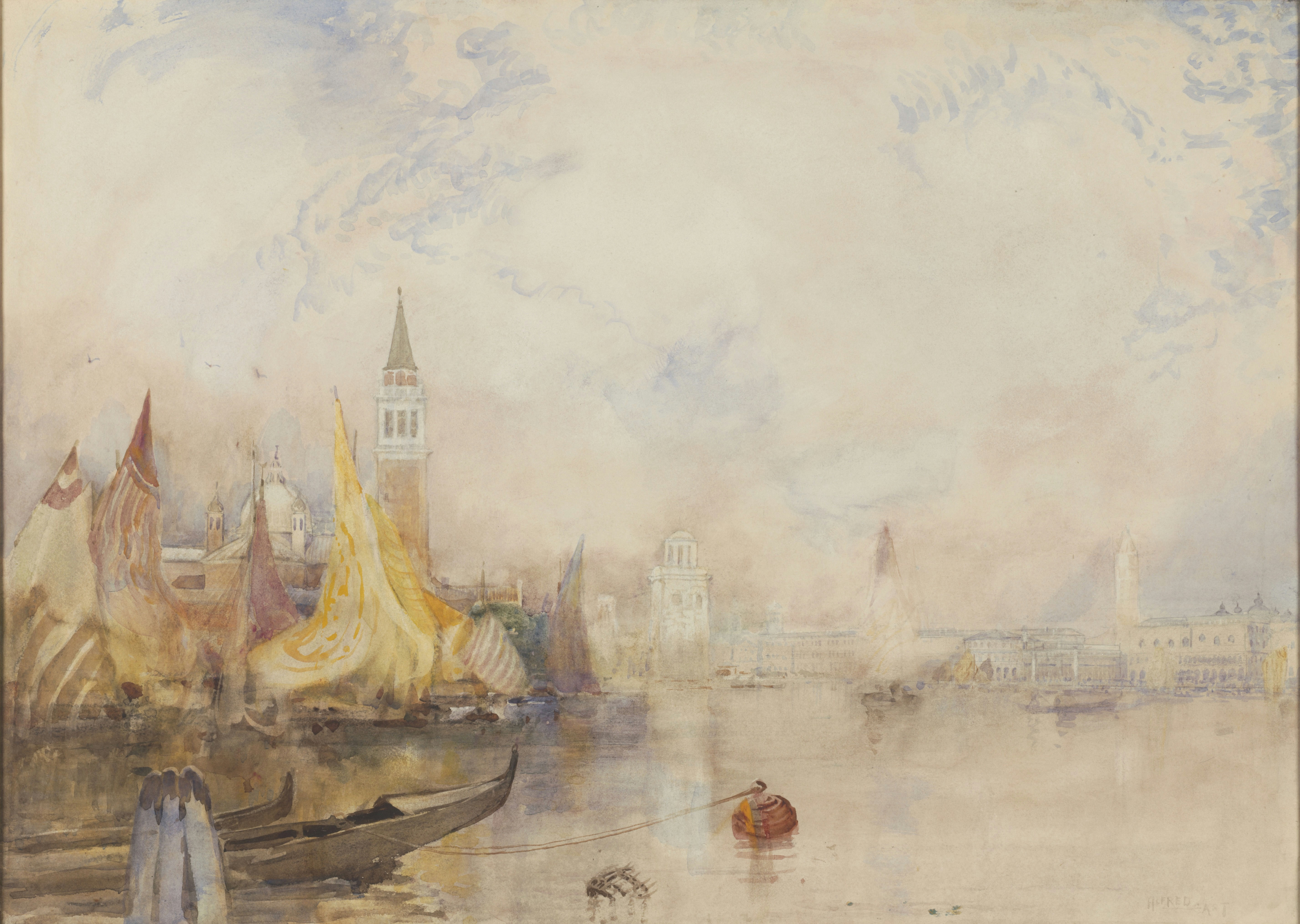
After Turner: Venice, Fog Blowing up from the Adriatic, watercolour by Alfred East, at Lancaster House

== See also ==
- Government Wine Cellar
- Parliamentary Art Collection
- Royal Collection
