= Ringlet (haircut) =

Hairstyle made of artificially curled hair

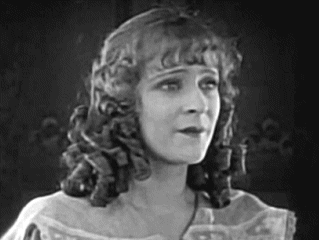
Marguerite De La Motte wearing her hair in ringlets in the 1921 film The Three Musketeers.

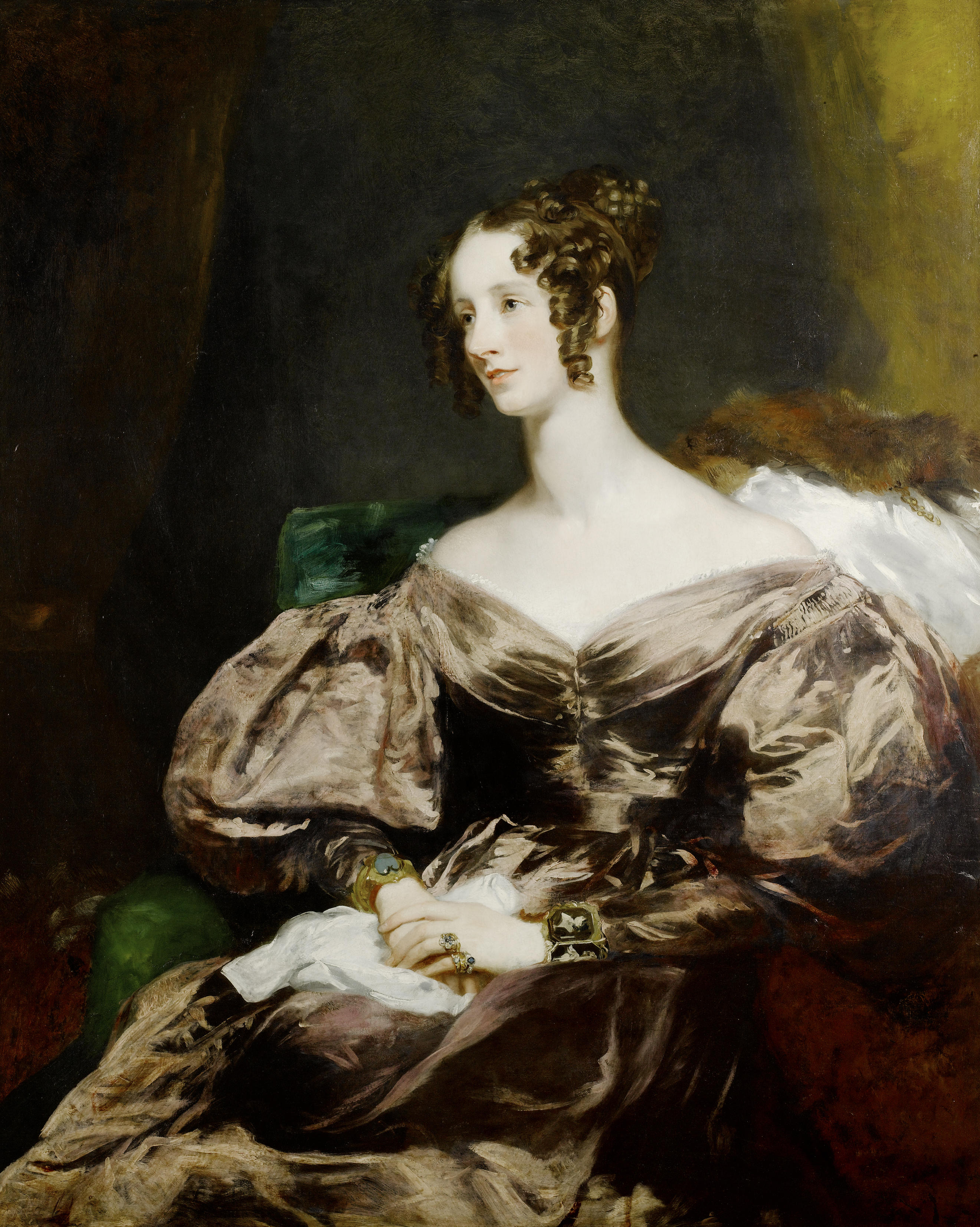
Portrait of Countess Howe by Margaret Sarah Carpenter, 1834. The painting displays the ringlets fashionable in the late Regency era.

A ringlet is a type of hairstyle. Ringlets are often also known as princess hair or corkscrews. It is achieved by wrapping a lock of hair around the length of a thin curling iron. The curls can also be achieved by hair rollers. Loose ringlets can be created just by twisting wet hair as well.

Many Haredi and Hasidic Jewish men wear payot, which may be curled as ringlets.

== See also ==
- List of hairstyles
- Fontange
