= Portrait of Countess Howe =

Painting by Margaret Sarah Carpenter

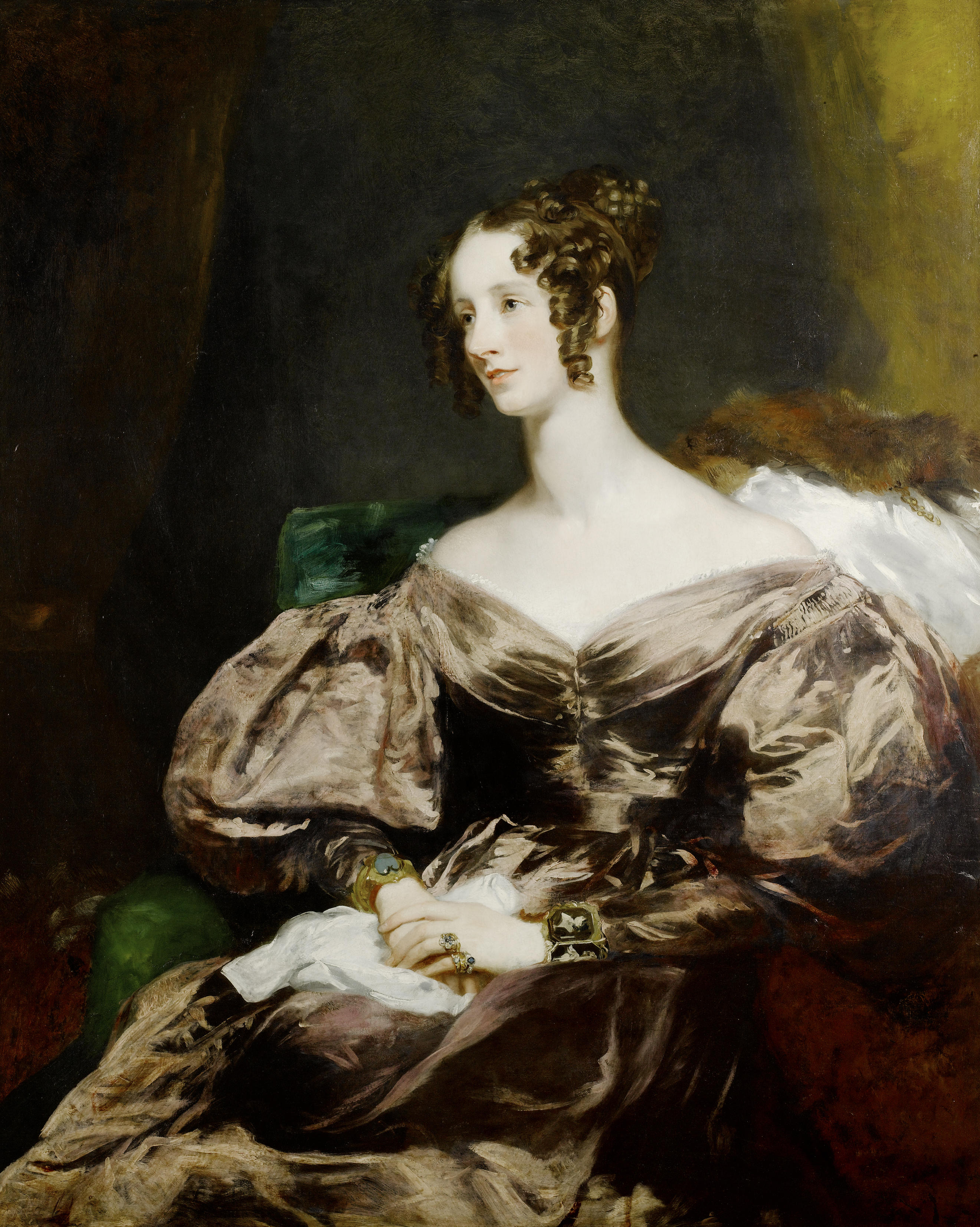
- Artist: Margaret Sarah Carpenter
- Year: 1834
- Type: Oil on canvas, portrait
- Dimensions: 128 cm × 102.5 cm (50 in × 40.4 in)
- Location: Private collection

Portrait of Countess Howe is an 1834 portrait painting by the British artist Margaret Sarah Carpenter of the English aristocrat Harriet Georgiana Brudenell, Countess Howe. It depicts Harriet Brudenell (1799–1836), the daughter of the Earl of Cardigan and his wife Penelope. She married Richard, Earl Howe, in 1820. She was the sister of Lord Cardigan, known for leading the Charge of the Light Brigade during the Crimean War. She is shown in the fashions of the late Regency era with her hair in ringlets.

Margaret Carpenter was a prominent high society portraitist in the style of Thomas Lawrence, whose work her work was frequently compared to. She exhibited at the Royal Academy for many decades, but was twice denied election to its membership. The work was exhibited at the academy's Summer Exhibition at Somerset House in 1834. She is also known for her 1836 Portrait of Ada Lovelace depicting the mathematician Ada Lovelace.

== Bibliography ==
- Adams, Beverley. Ada Lovelace: The World's First Computer Programmer.Pen and Sword History, 2023.
- Barber, Tabitha (ed.) Now You See Us: Women Artists in Britain, 1520-1920. Tate Britain, 2024.
