= Pallor =

Pale skin caused by low levels of oxyhaemoglobin

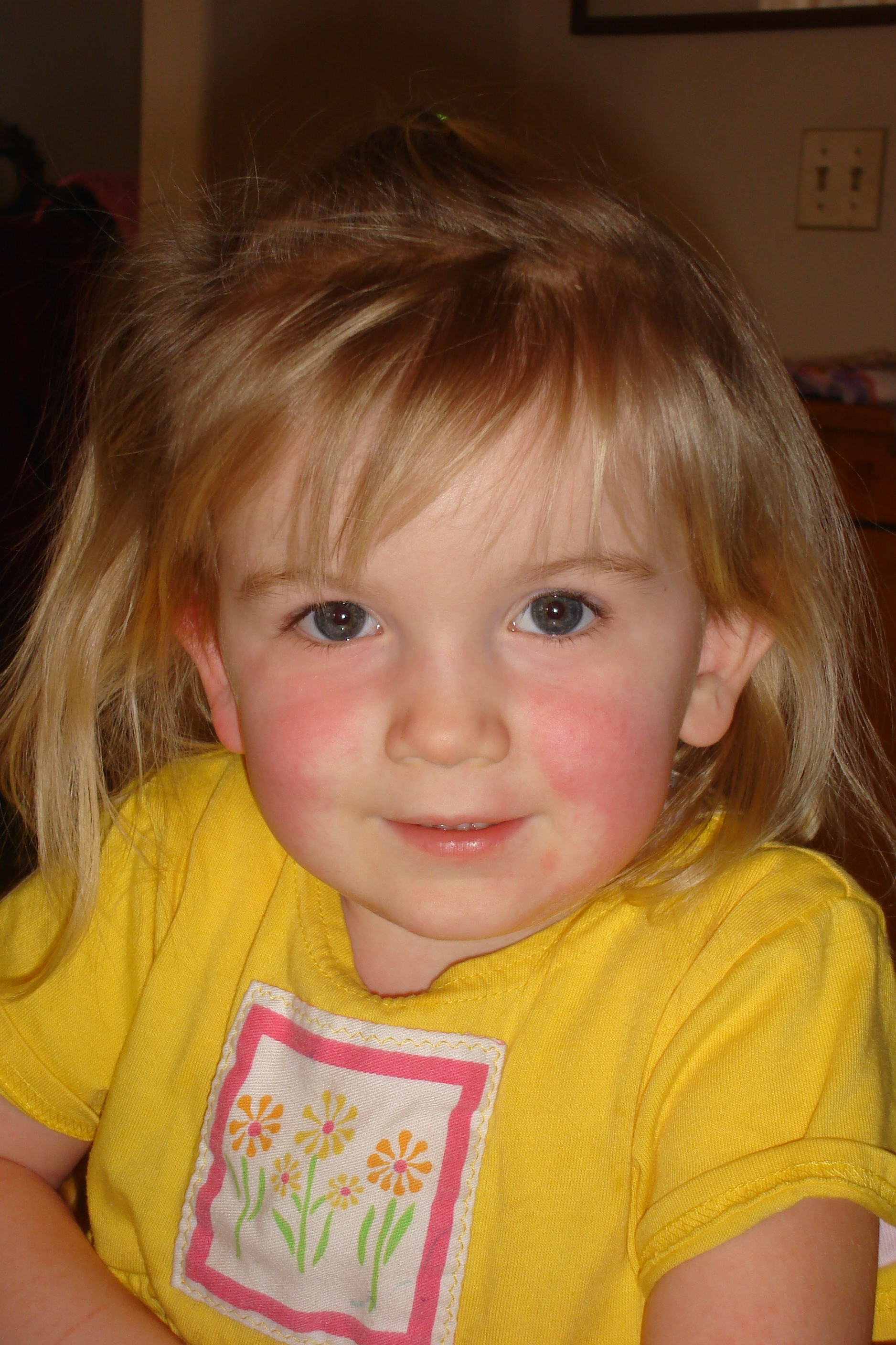
- A girl with circumoral pallor due to scarlet fever
- Specialty: Hematology, Rheumatology, Dermatology
- Differential diagnosis: Hypopigmentation

Pallor is a pale color of the skin that can be caused by illness, emotional shock or stress, stimulant use, or anemia, and is the result of a reduced amount of oxyhaemoglobin and may also be visible as pallor of the conjunctivae of the eyes on physical examination.

Pallor is more evident on the face and palms. It can develop suddenly or gradually, depending on the cause. It is not usually clinically significant unless it is accompanied by a general pallor (pale lips, tongue, palms, mouth and other regions with mucous membranes). It is distinguished from similar presentations such as hypopigmentation (lack or loss of skin pigment) or simply a lightly-melanated complexion.

In patients with dark skin, pallor is more subtle and harder to detect, often manifesting as a more grayish or ashy tone of skin in individuals with very dark brown skin, or alternatively a more yellowish tone in individuals with lighter brown skin. Assessing the palms, soles, and mucous membranes with appropriate lighting in such cases may make detection easier.

== Causes ==
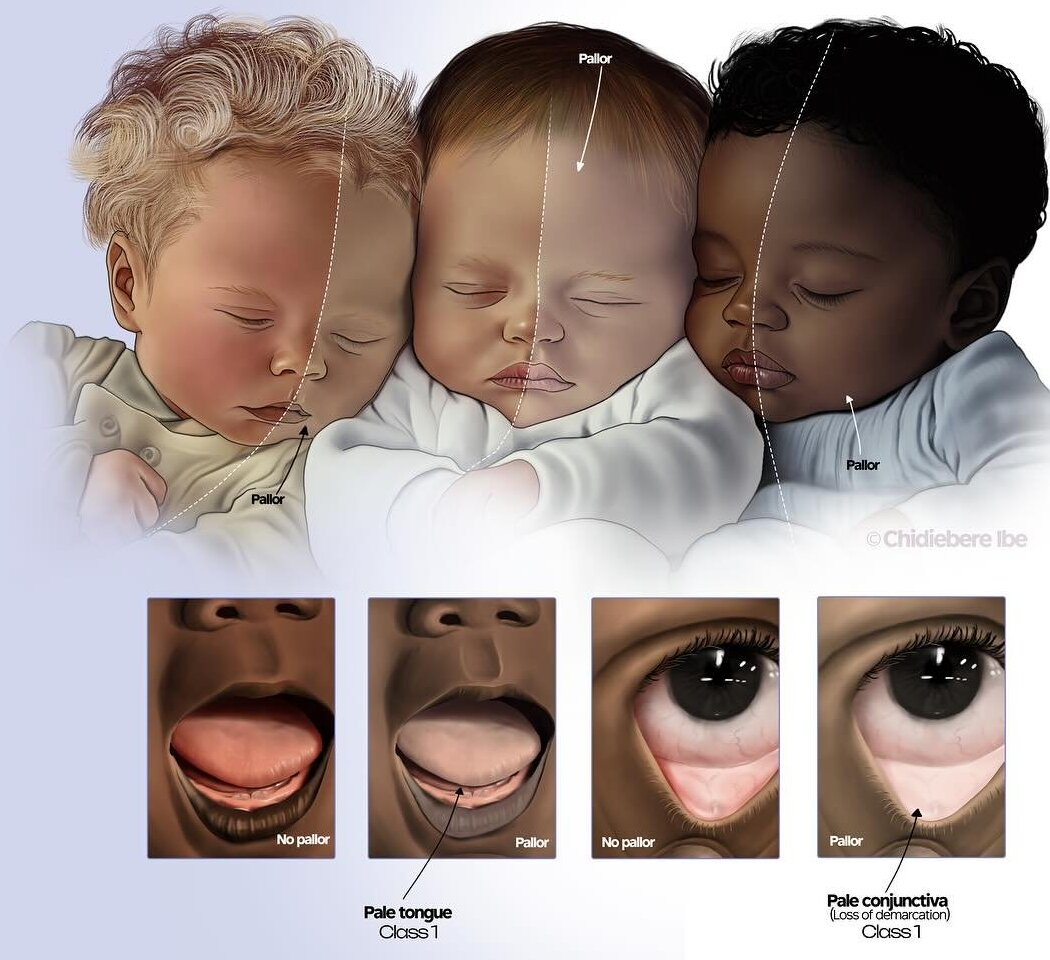
Effects of different skin tone on the appearance of pallor

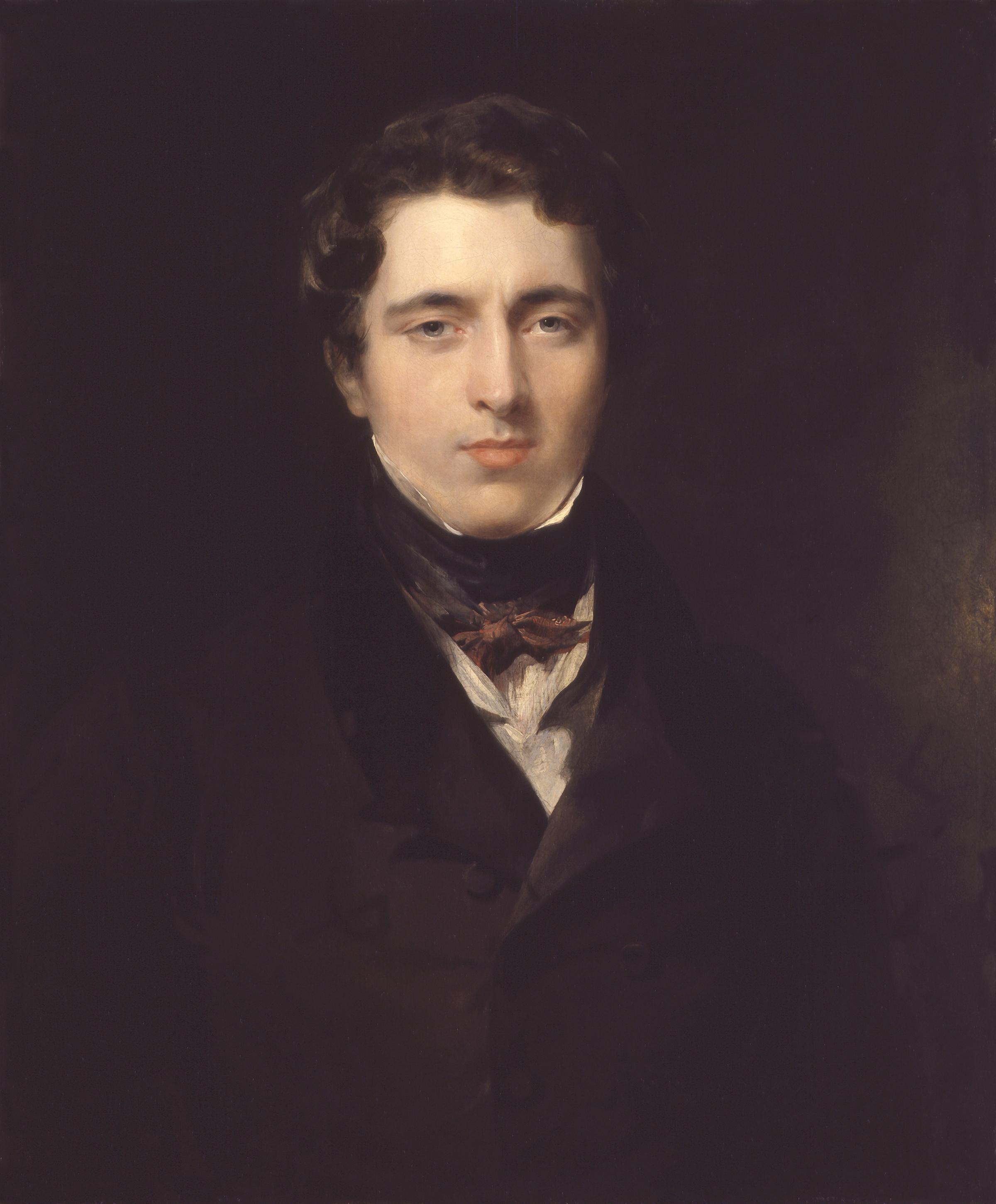
Portrait of Richard Parkes Bonington by Margaret Sarah Carpenter. Bonington was suffering from tuberculosis and the paleness of his face was noted by critics.

- migraine attack or headache
- excess estradiol and/or estrone
- osteoporosis
- emotional response, due to fear, embarrassment, grief, rage
- anorexia
- anemia, due to blood loss, poor nutrition, or underlying disease such as sickle cell anemia
- iron deficiency
- vitamin B12 deficiency
- shock, a medical emergency caused by illness or injury
- acute compartment syndrome
- frostbite
- common cold
- cancer
- hypoglycaemia
- bradycardia
- panic attack
- medications
  - ketorolac
  - amphetamines
  - ethanol
  - cannabis
- lead poisoning
- motion sickness
- heart disease
- Peripheral vascular disease
- hypothyroidism
- hypopituitarism
- scurvy
- tuberculosis
- sleep deprivation
- pheochromocytoma
- squeamishness
- visceral larva migrans
- Orthostatic hypotension
- methyldopa
- loss of appetite
- Space adaptation syndrome
- fibromyalgia
- Buerger's disease
- Hypovolemia
- death
