= Portrait of Richard Parkes Bonington =

Painting by Margaret Sarah Carpenter

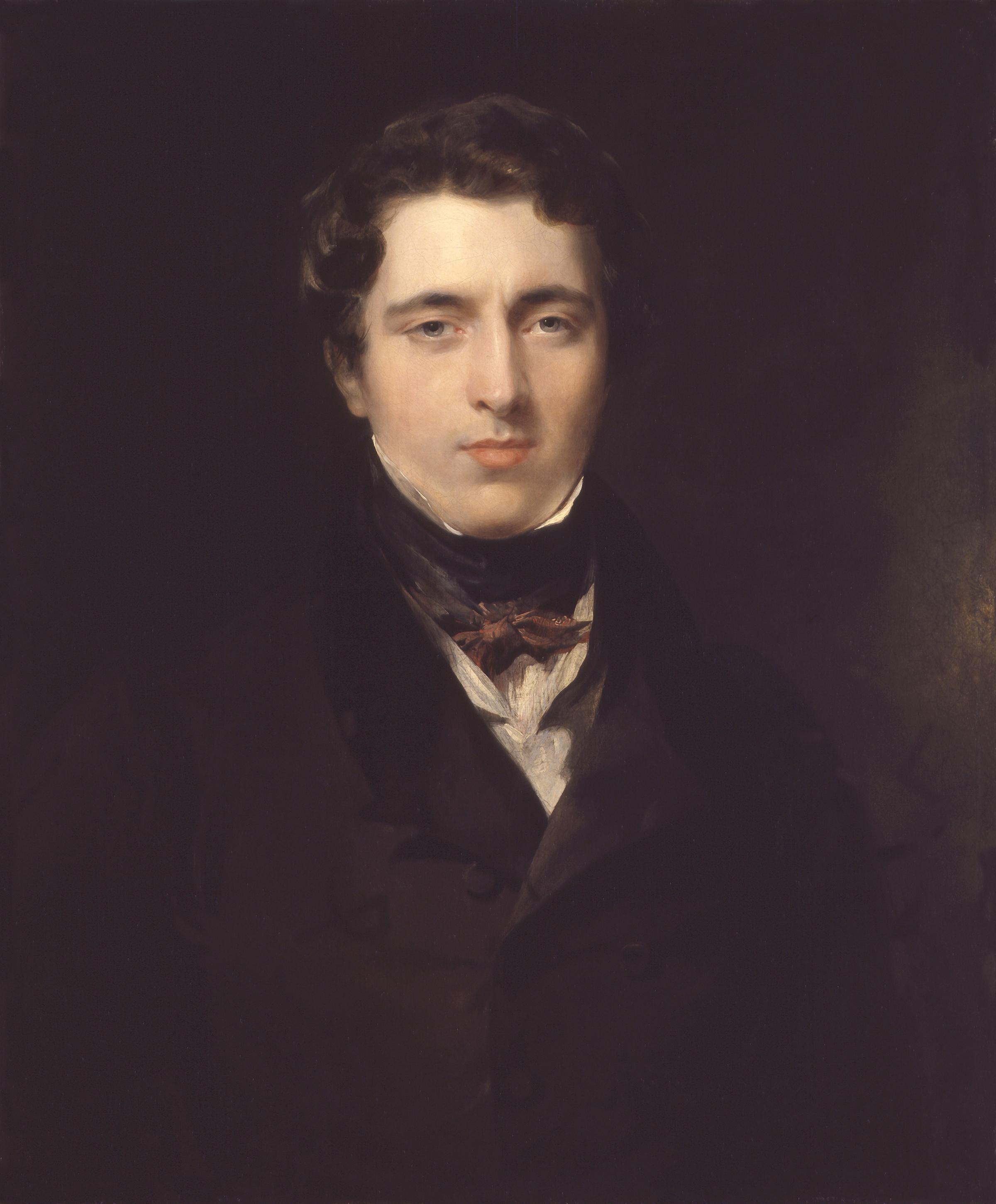
- Artist: Margaret Sarah Carpenter
- Year: 1827-1830
- Type: Oil on canvas, portrait
- Dimensions: 76.2 cm × 63.5 cm (30.0 in × 25.0 in)
- Location: National Portrait Gallery; London

Portrait of Richard Parkes Bonnington is a portrait painting by the English artist Margaret Sarah Carpenter, from c. 1827-1830. It depicts her fellow artist Richard Parkes Bonington.

Bonington painted landscapes and cityscapes in the romantic style. He enjoyed success at the Royal Academy's Summer Exhibition in 1828 but died a few months later of tuberculosis at the age of twenty five. He was a friend of Carpenter, a noted portraitist of the Regency and early Victorian era. It was exhibited at the Society of British Artists in 1833. Reviewers noted the pale look of Bonington in her portrait.

Today it is in the collection of the National Portrait Gallery in London, having been acquired in 1877. A copy of the mezzotint version of the work by John P. Quilley is also in the collection.

== Bibliography ==
- Barber, Tabitha (ed.) Now You See Us: Women Artists in Britain, 1520-1920. Tate Britain, 2024.
- Tankard, Alex. Tuberculosis and Disabled Identity in Nineteenth Century Literature: Invalid Lives. Springer, 2018.
