= Percy Carpenter =

English painter

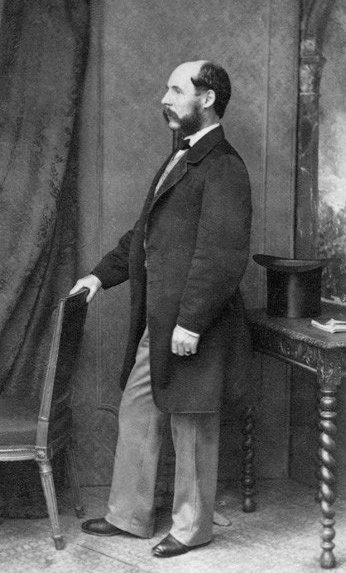
- Percy Carpenter, c. 1862
- Born: 1820
- Died: 1895 (aged 74–75)
- Education: Royal Academy
- Occupation: Painter
- Parents: William Hookham Carpenter; Margaret Sarah Carpenter

Percy Carpenter (1820–1895), the son of William Hookham Carpenter and Margaret Sarah Carpenter, was an English painter.

== Biography ==
Carpenter studied painting in the British Royal Academy and exhibited there, and at the British Institution ca. 1841–1842. From 1851 to 1858 he worked in Asia, producing works exhibited in the National Museum of Singapore and the Royal Academy.

In 1859, he was in India, where he produced works now exhibited in the India Office Library and published in books. In 1861 he published "Boar Hunting in India" which included "The Charge" (see illustration). Like his father, he also served as a Keeper of Prints at the British Museum. He was a friend of art critic, illustrator, and director of the British National Portrait Gallery, Sir George Scharf.

== Gallery ==
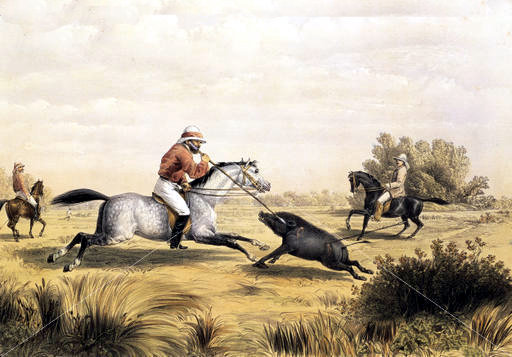
Hog Hunting in Bengal - plate 5, The Charge

Ground of the Calcutta Cricket Club, 15th Jan'y. 1861 H.M. 68th L.I. from Rangoon, versus the Calcutta Cricket Club, depicting a visit by the 68th (Durham) Regiment of Foot (Light Infantry) to Calcutta Cricket Club (lithograph)
