= William Hookham Carpenter =

British antiquary (1792–1866)

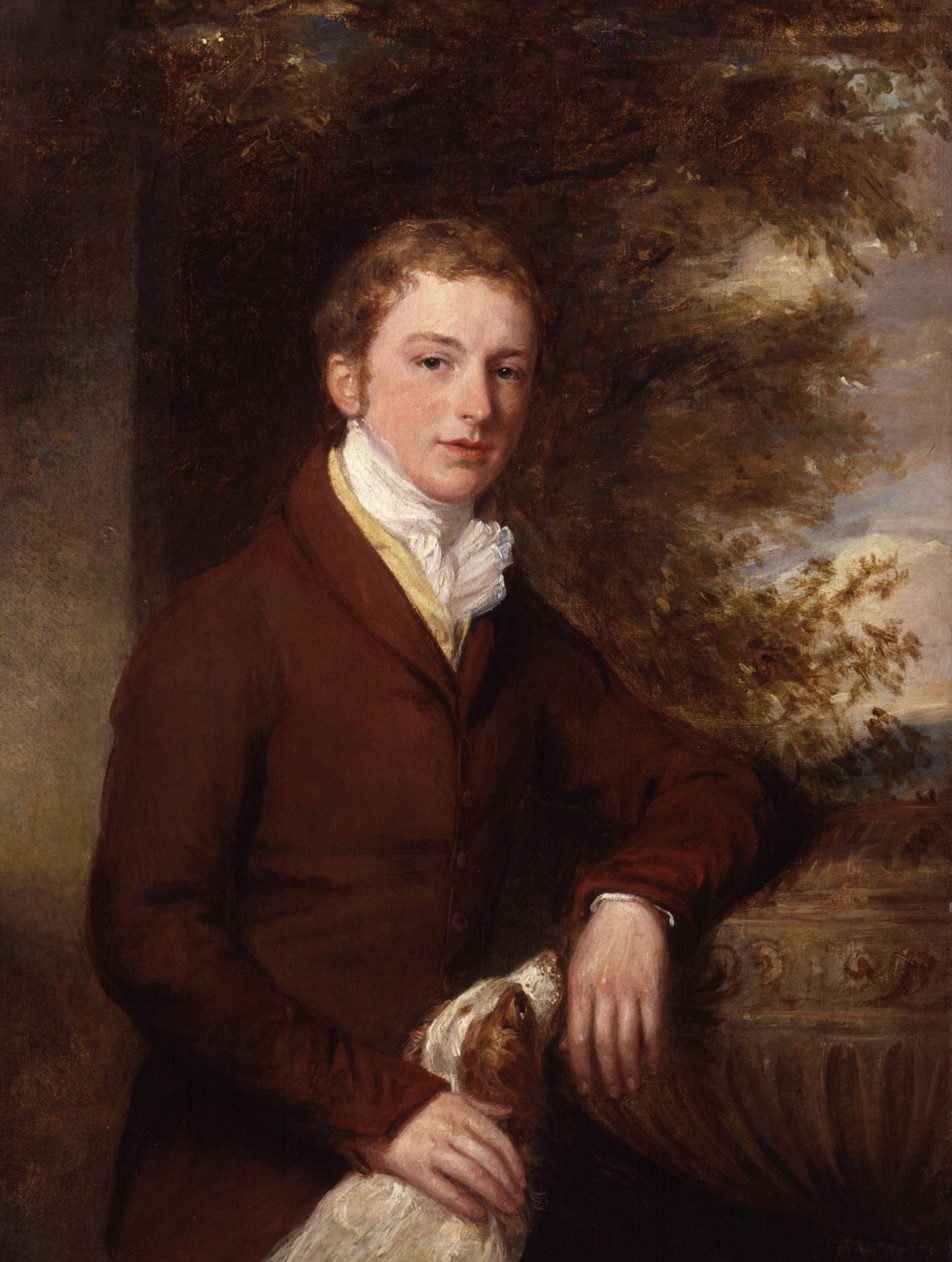
- Born: 2 March 1792; Bruton Street, London, UK
- Died: 1866 (aged 74); London, UK
- Employer: British Museum
- Spouse: Margaret Geddes

William Hookham Carpenter (2 March 1792 – 1866) was a British antiquary, and Keeper of Prints at the British Museum.

== Biography ==
Carpenter was born in Bruton Street, London on 2 March 1792. He was the son of James Carpenter, a bookseller in Old Bond Street. In 1817, Carpenter married portraitist Margaret Sarah Geddes. He tried painting and publishing, although found employment as the Keeper of Prints at the British Museum. He purchased a number of notable drawings including some by Michelangelo and Raphael.

Carpenter died at the British Museum in July 1866, aged 74, and was buried with his wife Margaret (d. 1872) and daughter, Henrietta (d. 1895), on the western side of Highgate Cemetery. The grave (plot no. 14768) no longer has a headstone.

William and Margaret's children included two noted painters, another William and Percy Carpenter who both travelled and painted in the Indian subcontinent.
