= William Carpenter (painter) =

English painter (1818–1899)

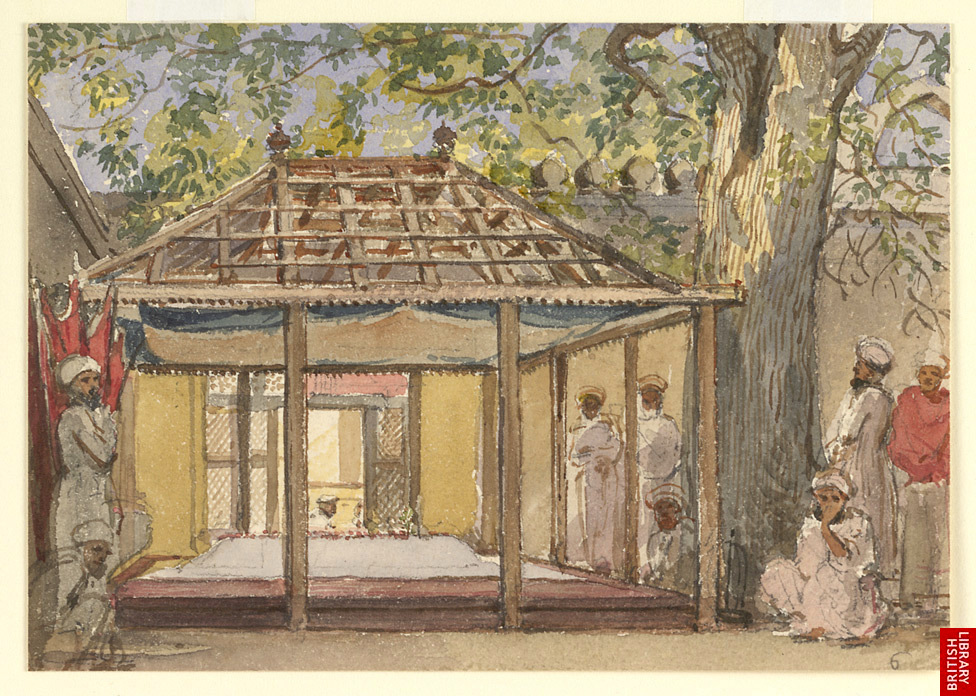
- The Tomb of Aurangzeb at Khuldabad, Aurangabad - 1850s by Carpenter
- Born: c.1818 London, England
- Died: 1899; London
- Other name: Watercolors of India in the 1850s
- Education: Royal Academy
- Occupation: artist
- Parent(s): William Hookham Carpenter and Margaret Carpenter (Geddes)

William Carpenter (1818–1899) was an English watercolour artist. He travelled for six or seven years in the 1850s painting scenes of India, its people and its life. The Victoria and Albert Museum bought over 280 of his paintings. In 1856 he painted Prince Fakhr-ud Din Mirza, the eldest son of Bahadur Shah II, the last King of Delhi, five months before the Prince died.

== Biography ==
=== Early life ===
William Carpenter was born in about 1818. He was the eldest son of William Hookham Carpenter and his wife, Margaret Carpenter (born Geddes). His father was a keeper at the British Museum and his mother was a noted portrait artist. William entered the Royal Academy Schools in 1835. He initially painted with oils but quickly took to water colour.

=== India ===
William followed his brother abroad in the early 1850s and painted in India for some years. Carpenter kept no diary, however his large collection of dated watercolour paintings allows his journey to be recreated. He travelled overland through Egypt and arrived in Bombay in June 1850. Almost immediately he travelled to Poona where others were escaping the heat in the mountains. By the time he returned to Bombay in about December he had painted a school in the old Maratha Palace and views of the Shaniwar Palace. He saw the new year in whilst visiting Salsette Island, after he had spent Christmas Day painting Mount Mary's Basilica at Bandra. His paintings included a view of the Mahim Causeway which had recently been built to join Salsette island to the mainland.

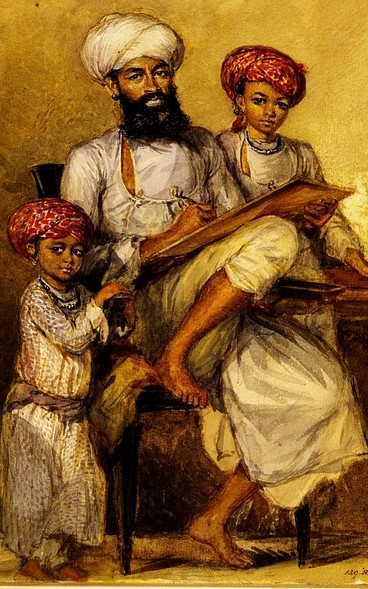
Carpenter's painting of Tara Chand in June or July 1851

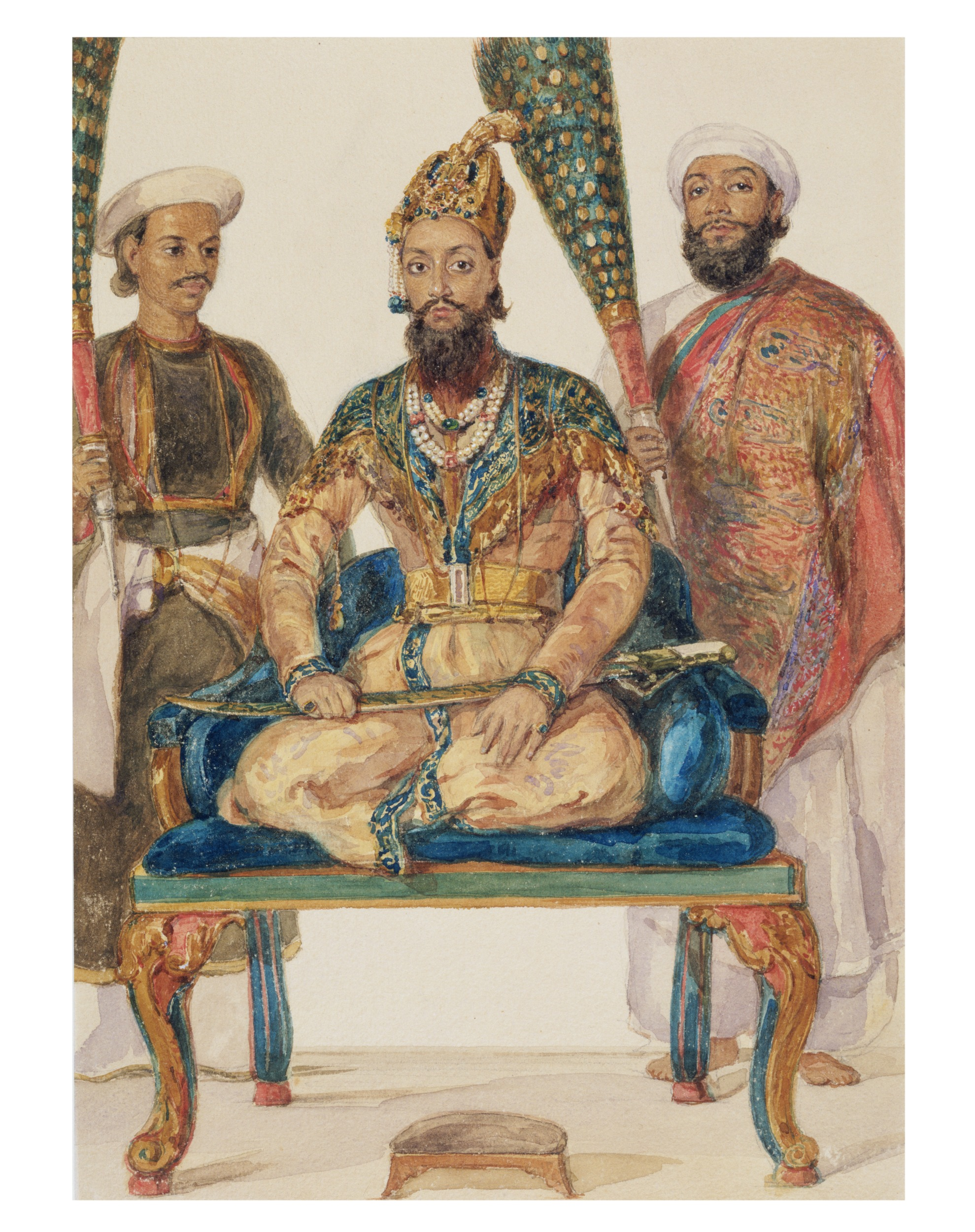
Prince Fakhr-ud Din Mirza

In 1851, Carpenter met Tara Chand, the court painter to Maharana Sarup Singh of Udaipur and recorded that meeting with a painting of the Indian artist and his two sons. The painting shows Chand drawing – so he may have been drawing Carpenter at the same time. Carpenter painted landscapes and portraits of local rulers. He made three annual trips to Kashmir in 1853, 1854 and 1855. Carpenter painted the Golden Temple of Amritsar in 1854. He travelled through the Punjab, Afghanistan and then to Rajasthan before returning to England in 1857. An important painting he returned with was a portrait of Prince Fakhr-ud Din Mirza, who was the eldest son of Bahadur Shah II, which he completed in February 1856. The prince died five months later, in July 1856. He and Carpenter missed the Indian Rebellion of 1857 when his brothers were killed.

== England ==
After his return Carpenter was able to sell his paintings as the basis of stories to the Illustrated London News. Carpenter later travelled to Boston, Massachusetts and was there in 1866, but it is not known how long he spent in the United States.

Carpenter had a one-man exhibition in South Kensington Museum in 1881 which included 275 paintings. After the exhibition all of the paintings were purchased by the new Victoria and Albert Museum. The museum still has dozens of his paintings which record India in the 1850s and at least one other painting that it bought in 1884 which still uses India as its subject.

He died still a bachelor in London in 1899.
