= Squeamishness =

Feeling of repulsion, disgust, or faintness

Squeamishness typically refers to feelings of faintness, repulsion, disgust, or physical illness brought on by exposure to certain external stimuli.

== Causes ==
Anything can cause someone to feel squeamish. Some examples of common triggers are the sight of blood or other bodily fluids, witnessing a human endure pain, the sight of insects, strong smells, and general ideas such as war, hospitals, or death. While these are common triggers, there are no limits to what stimuli can cause this reaction as it is based on the subjective observations of the person experiencing it. The feeling can also be triggered by traumatic experiences from the past. People can feel squeamish while witnessing, thinking of, or speaking about any particularly unpleasant topic. Often squeamishness is associated with medical phobias, as some of the most common triggers include sites or experiences one may encounter during a medical emergency.

== Symptoms ==
Symptoms of squeamishness may include dizziness, lightheadedness, nausea, shaking, and pallor.

In extreme instances it can also cause vomiting and fainting.

== See also ==
- List of phobias
