= Portrait of John Gibson =

Painting by Margaret Sarah Carpenter

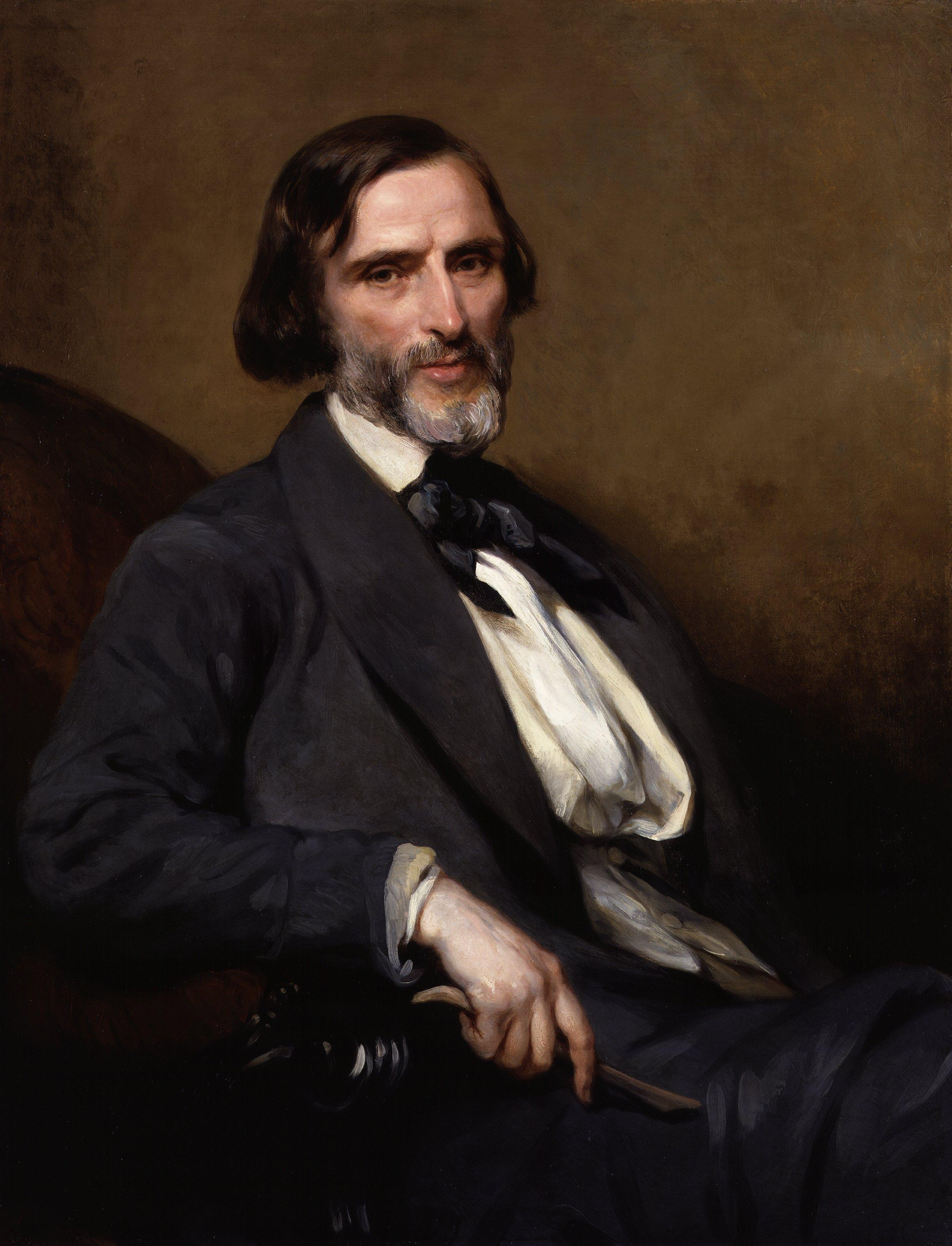
- Artist: Margaret Sarah Carpenter
- Year: 1857
- Type: Oil on canvas, portrait painting
- Dimensions: 234 cm × 181 cm (92.1 in × 71.1 in)
- Location: National Portrait Gallery, London

Portrait of John Gibson is an 1857 portrait painting by the British artist Margaret Sarah Carpenter, one of the most prominent female painters in early Victorian Britain. It depicts the sculptor John Gibson, a member of the Royal Academy.

The work was display at the Royal Academy's Summer Exhibition of 1857. Today the painting is in the collection of the National Portrait Gallery in London, having been purchased in 1867.

== Bibliography ==
- Barber, Tabitha (ed.) Now You See Us: Women Artists in Britain, 1520-1920. Tate Britain, 2024.
- Ormond, Richard. Early Victorian Portraits. University of California Press, 1974.
- Wright, Christopher, Gordon, Catherine May & Smith, Mary Peskett. British and Irish Paintings in Public Collections: An Index of British and Irish Oil Paintings by Artists Born Before 1870 in Public and Institutional Collections in the United Kingdom and Ireland. Yale University Press, 2006
