= Portrait of Ada Lovelace =

Painting by Margaret Sarah Carpenter

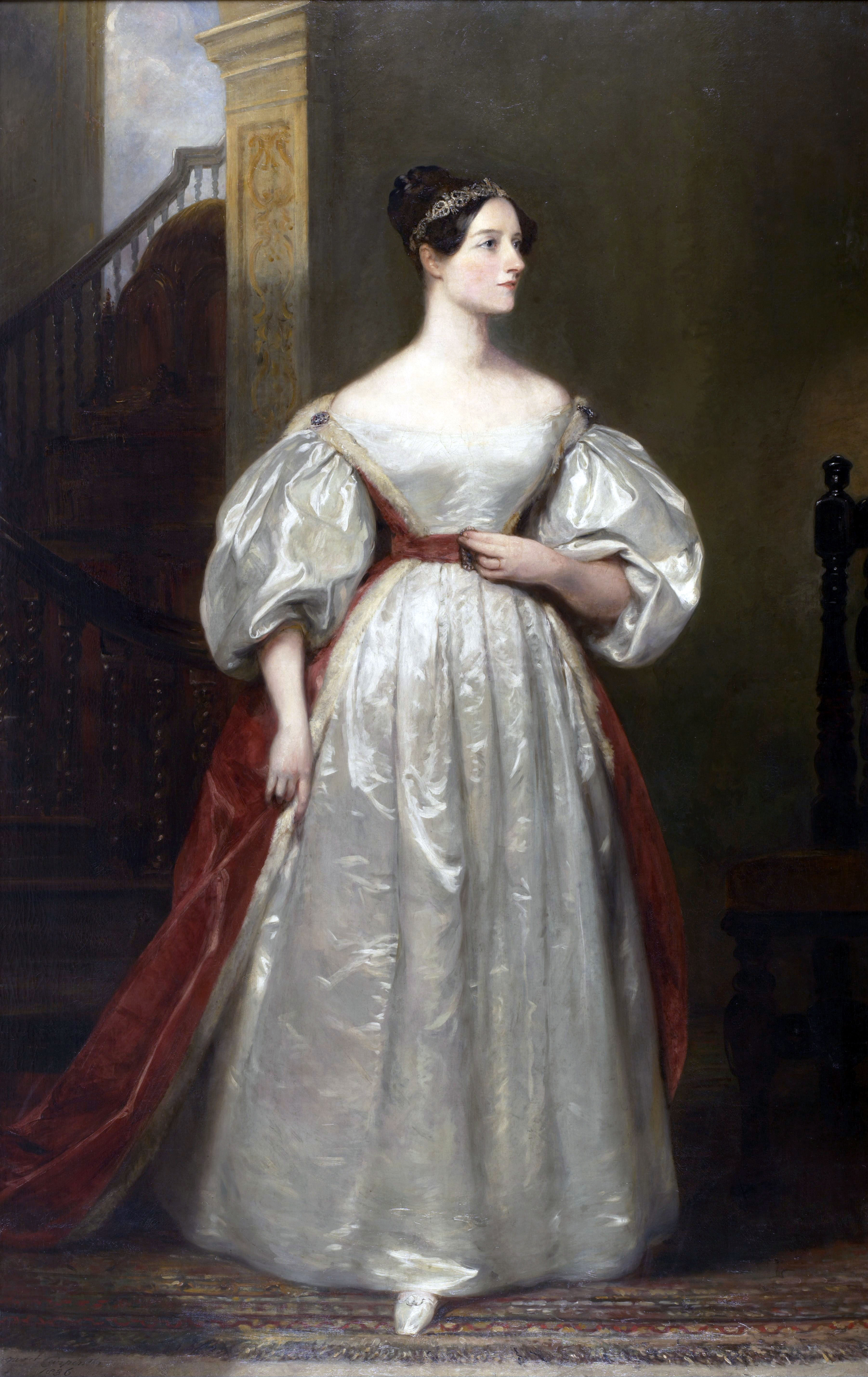
- Artist: Margaret Sarah Carpenter
- Year: 1836
- Type: Oil on canvas, portrait
- Dimensions: 220 cm × 137 cm (85 in × 53.9 in)
- Location: Government Art Collection, London

Portrait of Ada Lovelace is an oil on canvas portrait painting by the British artist Margaret Sarah Carpenter, from 1836. It depicts the mathematician Ada Lovelace.

Lovelace was the only daughter of the poet Lord Byron and his estranged wife, Lady Byron, and was raised by her mother. A contemporary of Charles Babbage she was one of the pioneers of computer science. Carpenter emerged as a prominent female artist of the Regency era, producing fashionable society portraits that drew comparisons to Thomas Lawrence.

Lovelace is depicted in full-length white dress with a red cape over her shoulders. It was painted the year she gave birth to her first child, having married her husband William King-Noel, 1st Earl of Lovelace the previous year. The painting was exhibited at the Royal Academy's Summer Exhibition of 1836. It is today part of the Government Art Collection and in 2023 was loaned to the National Portrait Gallery in London where it is on display.

== Bibliography ==
- Adams, Beverley. Ada Lovelace: The World's First Computer Programmer. Pen and Sword History, 2023.
- Barber, Tabitha (ed.) Now You See Us: Women Artists in Britain, 1520-1920. Tate Britain, 2024.
- Seymour, Miranda. In Byron's Wake. Simon and Schuster, 2018.
