= Margaret Sarah Carpenter =

English portrait painter (1793–1872)

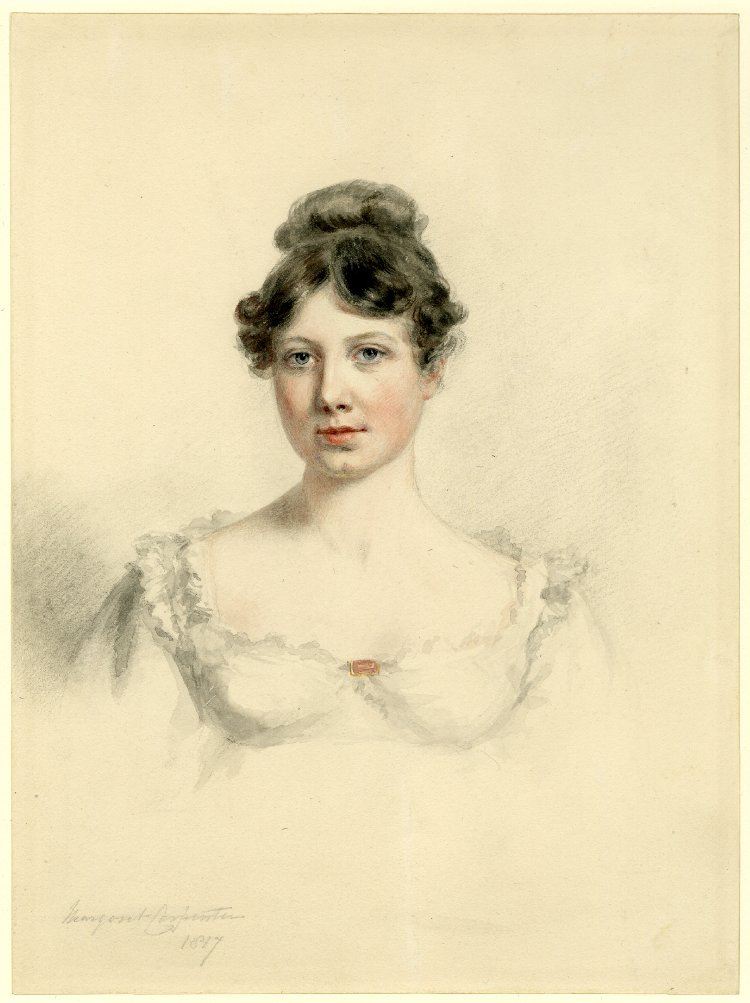
- Self-portrait, c. 1817
- Born: Margaret Sarah Geddes; 1793; Salisbury, England
- Died: 13 November 1872 (aged 78–79); London, England
- Known for: Portrait painting
- Spouse: William Hookham Carpenter

Margaret Sarah Carpenter (née Geddes; 1793 – 13 November 1872) was an English painter. Noted in her time, she mostly painted portraits in the manner of Sir Thomas Lawrence. She was a close friend of Richard Parkes Bonington.

== Early life ==
Carpenter was born in Salisbury, the daughter of Captain Alexander Geddes, who was of an Edinburgh family, and Harriet Easton. She was taught art by a local drawing-master. Her first art studies were made from the pictures at Longford Castle, belonging to the Earl of Radnor.

== Career ==
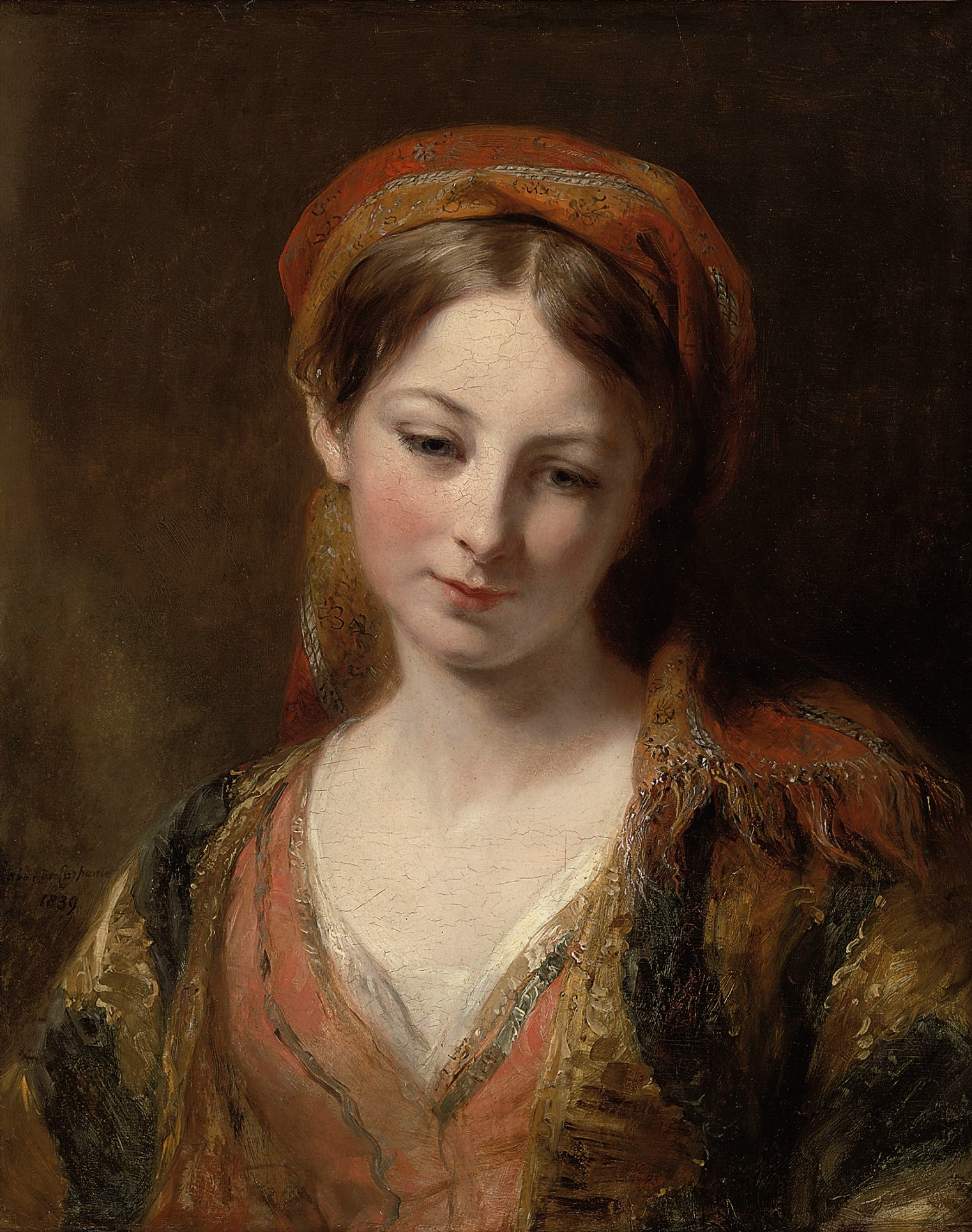
A young girl by Margaret Sarah Carpenter (1839)

In 1812, one of Carpenter's copies of the head of a boy was awarded a medal by the Society of Arts, who awarded her another medal in 1813, and a gold medal in 1814. She went to London in 1814, and soon established her reputation as a fashionable portrait painter. She exhibited a portrait of Lord Folkestone at the Royal Academy in 1814, and a picture entitled 'The Fortune Teller' at the British Institution. She exhibited regularly at the Royal Academy between 1818 and 1866. Her painting The Lacemaker was on display at the 1857 Manchester Art Treasures exhibition. She also exhibited at the British Institution and at the Suffolk Street Gallery.

Of Carpenter's Head of a Polish Jew, exhibited at the British Institution in 1823, a reviewer wrote: "It very rarely happens that a specimen of art like this is produced from the hand of a lady: Here are colour, light, strength and effect, and anatomical drawing". The painting was bought for 45 guineas by the Marquess of Stafford, an influential art patrons, who had previously bought her medal-winning painting of 1813. In December 2013 the picture resurfaced at auction (with some fire damage) and was purchased by a family relative for restoration.

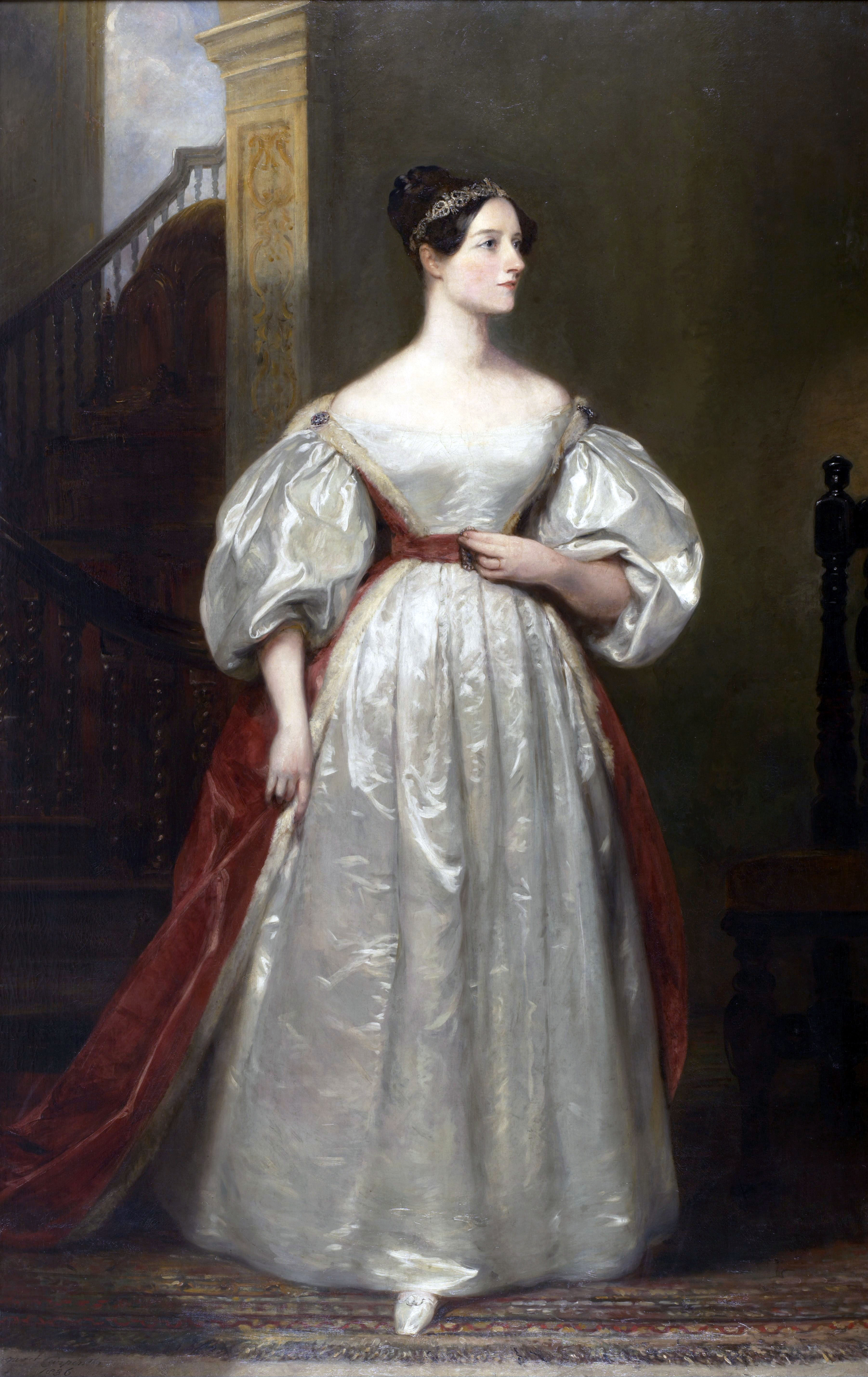
Portrait of Ada Lovelace by Margaret Sarah Carpenter

Among Carpenter's exhibited portraits were those of Sir H. Bunbury (1822), Lady Denbigh (1831), and Lady King (better known as Ada Lovelace) (1835). Her last work was a portrait of William Whewell. Three of her works are in the National Portrait Gallery collection in London, including portraits of her husband, Bonington and the sculptor John Gibson. There are also several 'leaving portraits' by her in the collection at Eton College. Her portrait of 'The 2nd Lord de Tabley in Academic Robes' hangs in the dining room at Tabley House. There is also one of her portraits at Frewen College, of Helen Louisa Frewen and her son Edward. Her "Portrait of a Lady" hangs in the Neill-Cochran House Museum in Austin, Texas.

Her portraits follow in the tradition of Lawrence, but Wood found them to be more fanciful and feminine character, particularly in her portraits of children.

== Family ==
In 1817, she married William Hookham Carpenter, Keeper of Prints and Drawings at the British Museum. Their children included two noted painters, another William and Percy Carpenter, who both travelled and painted in the Indian subcontinent. She introduced her sister Harriet to the young painter William Collins. They eventually married, making Margaret the aunt to Wilkie Collins, novelist and friend to Charles Dickens. On her husband's death in 1866, she was given an annual pension of £100 by Queen Victoria. This award was partly based on her husband's service, but also in recognition of her own artistic merits.

She died in London on 13 November 1872, in her 80th year, and was buried with her husband on the western side of Highgate Cemetery. The grave (plot no.14768) no longer has a headstone. Their daughter Henrietta was buried in the same grave in 1895.

== Gallery ==
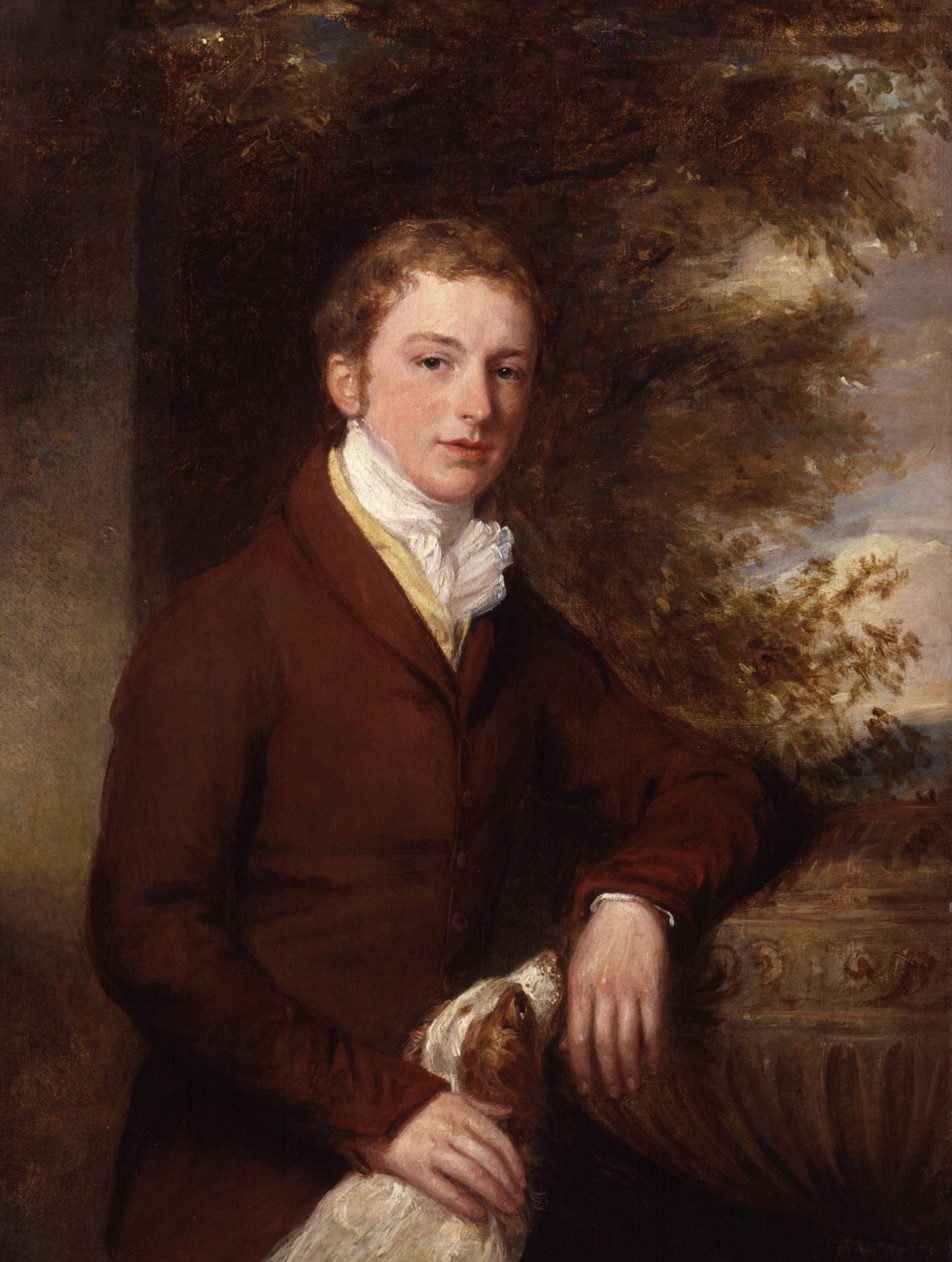
William Hookham Carpenter, 1816

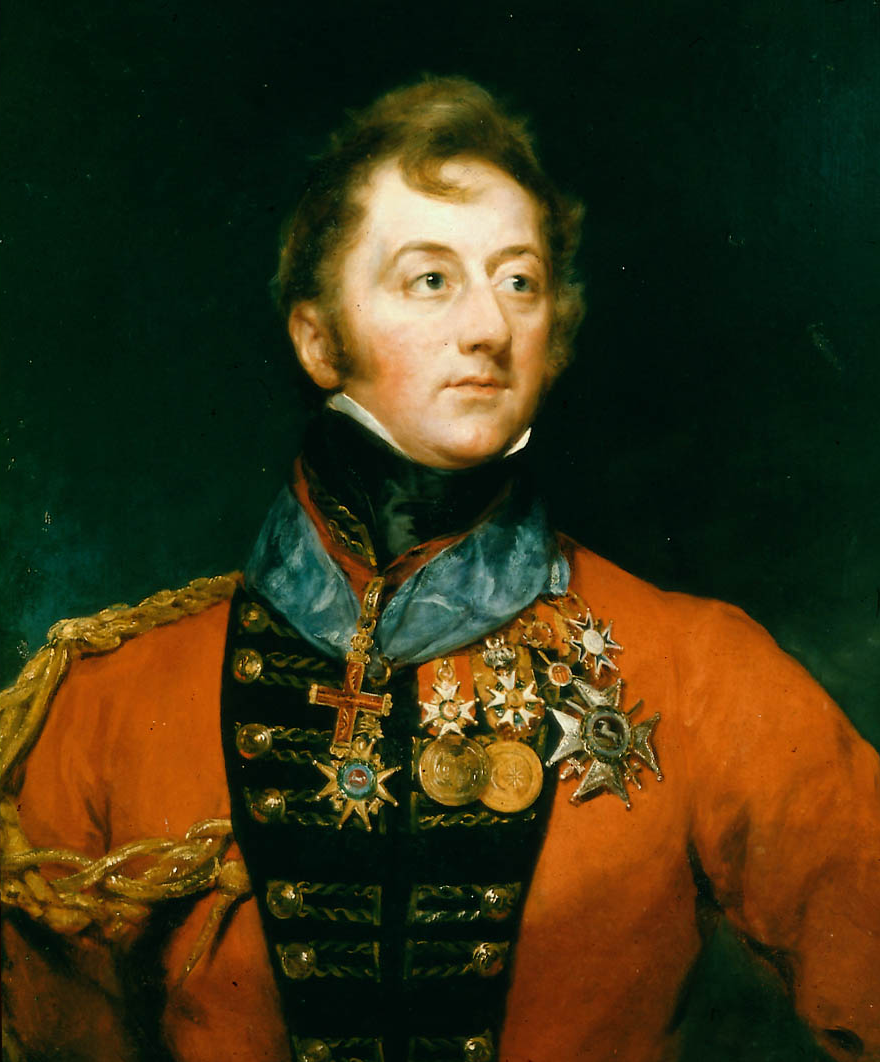
Sir Charles William Doyle, 1824

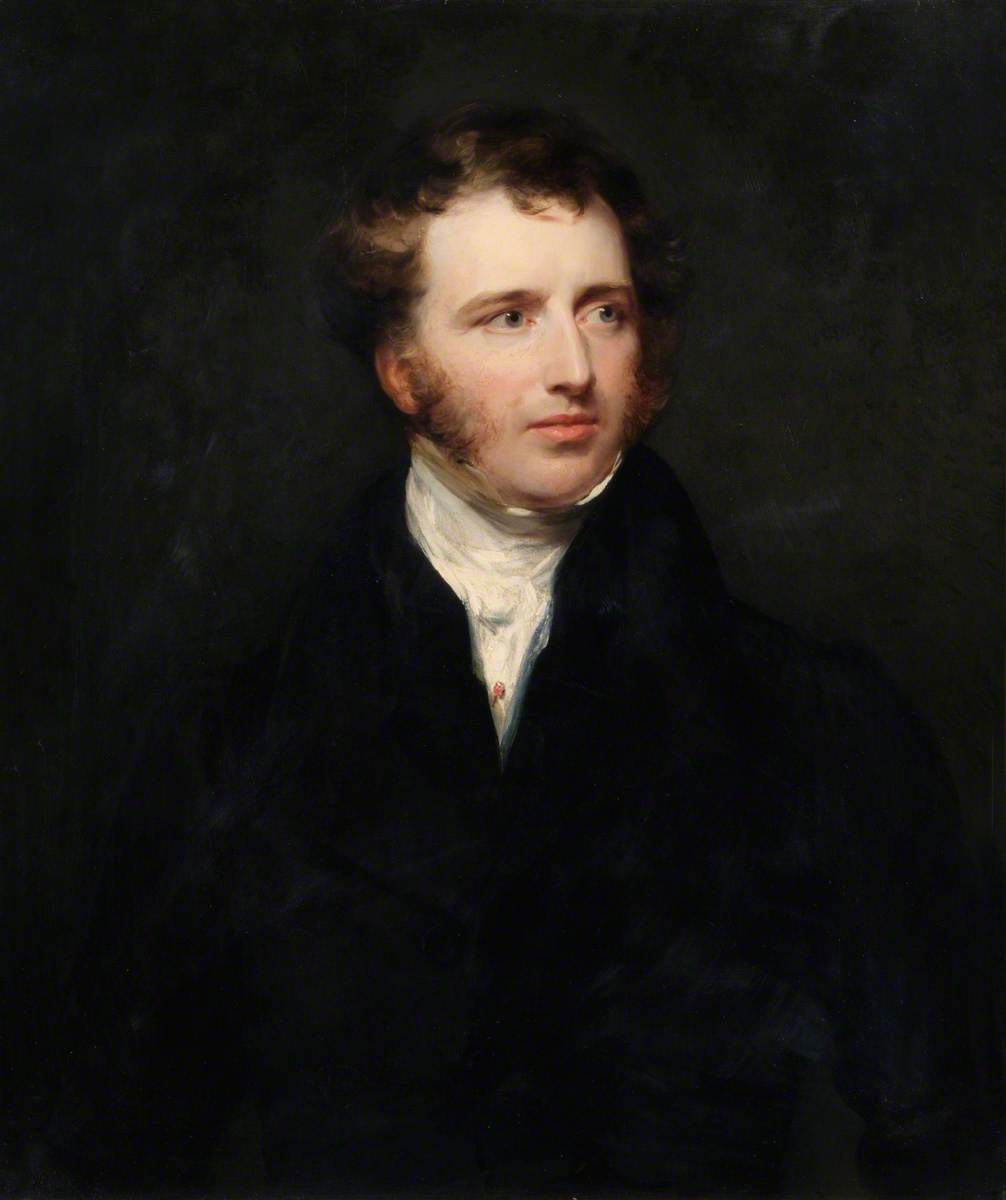
William Collins, 1828

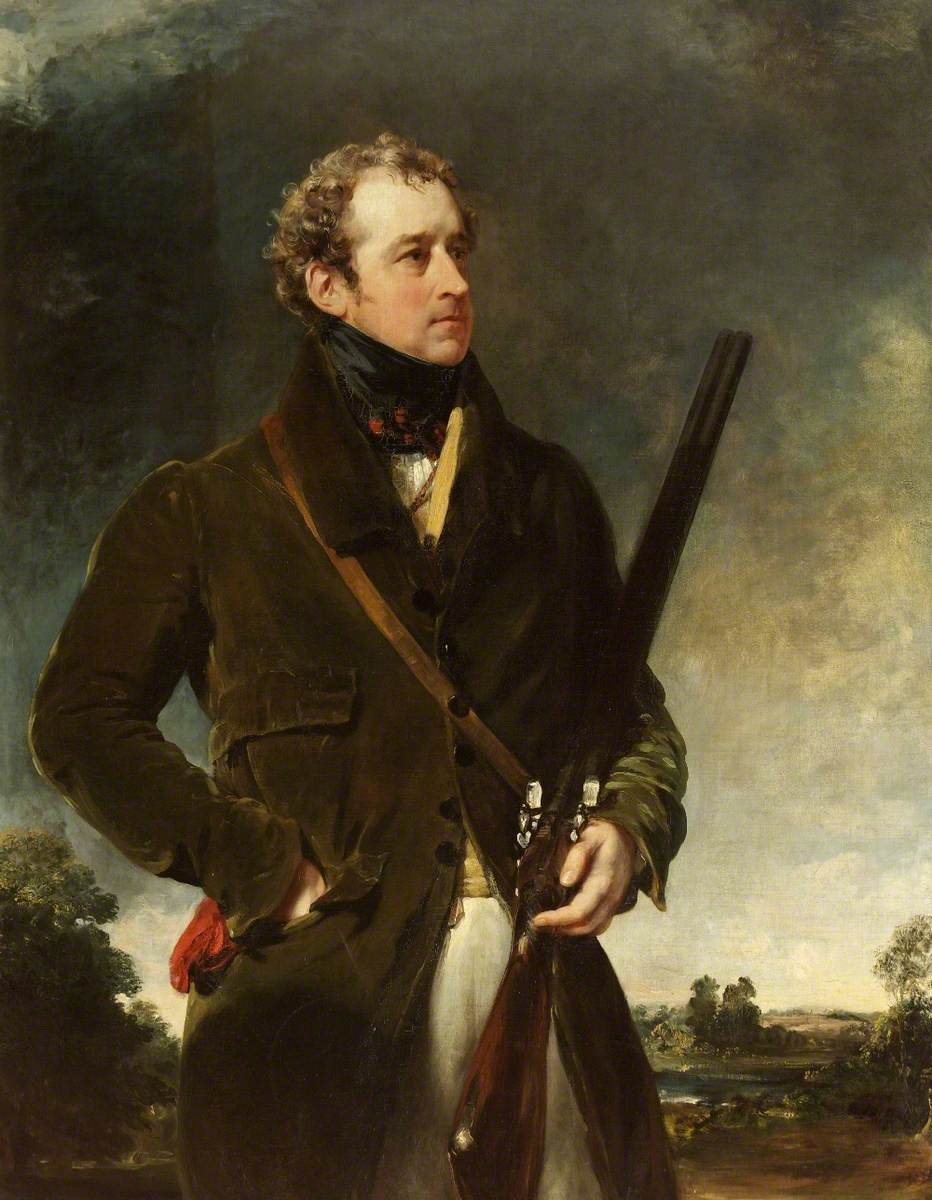
Henry Hoare, 1829

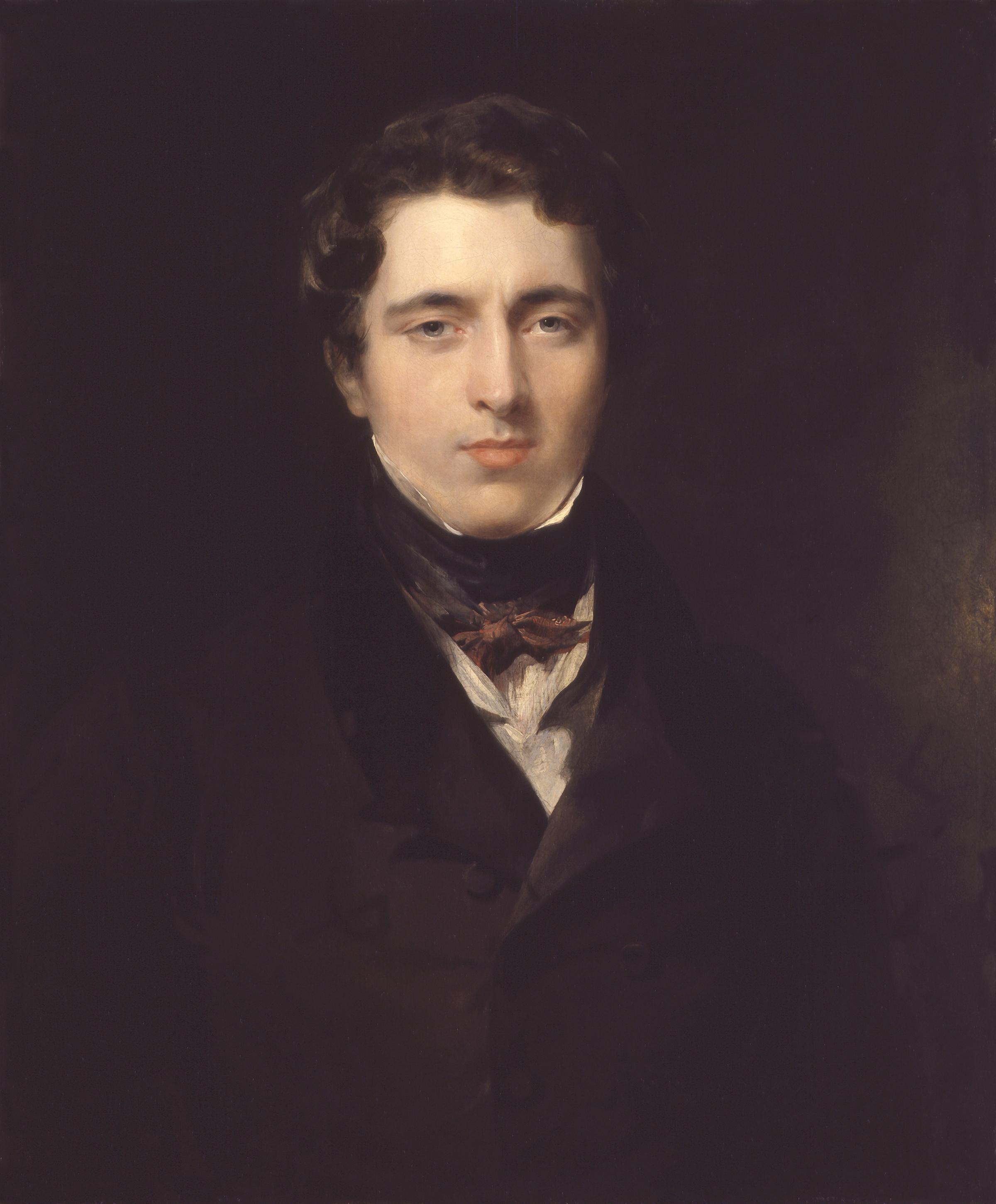
Portrait of Richard Parkes Bonington, c.1830

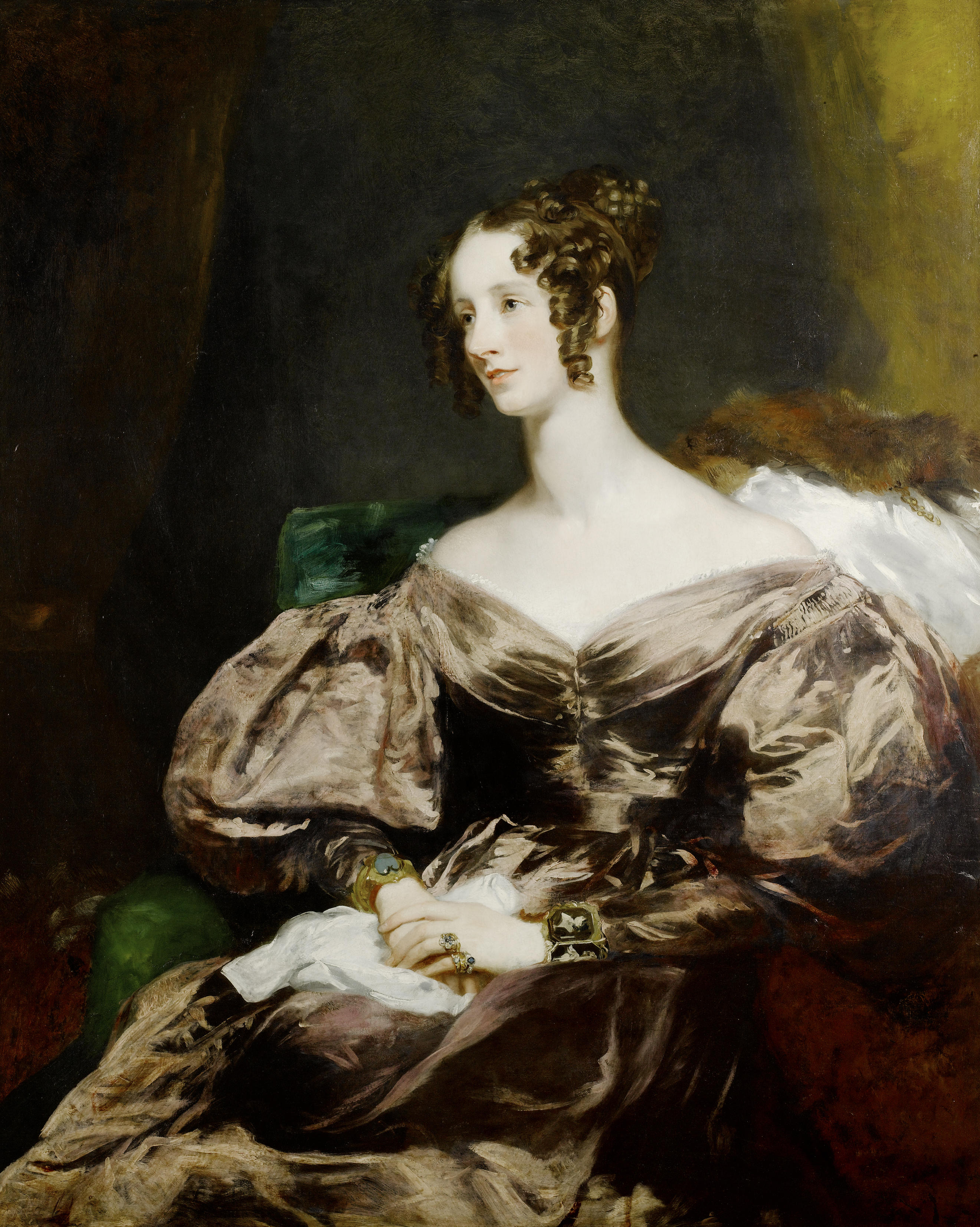
Portrait of Countess Howe, 1834

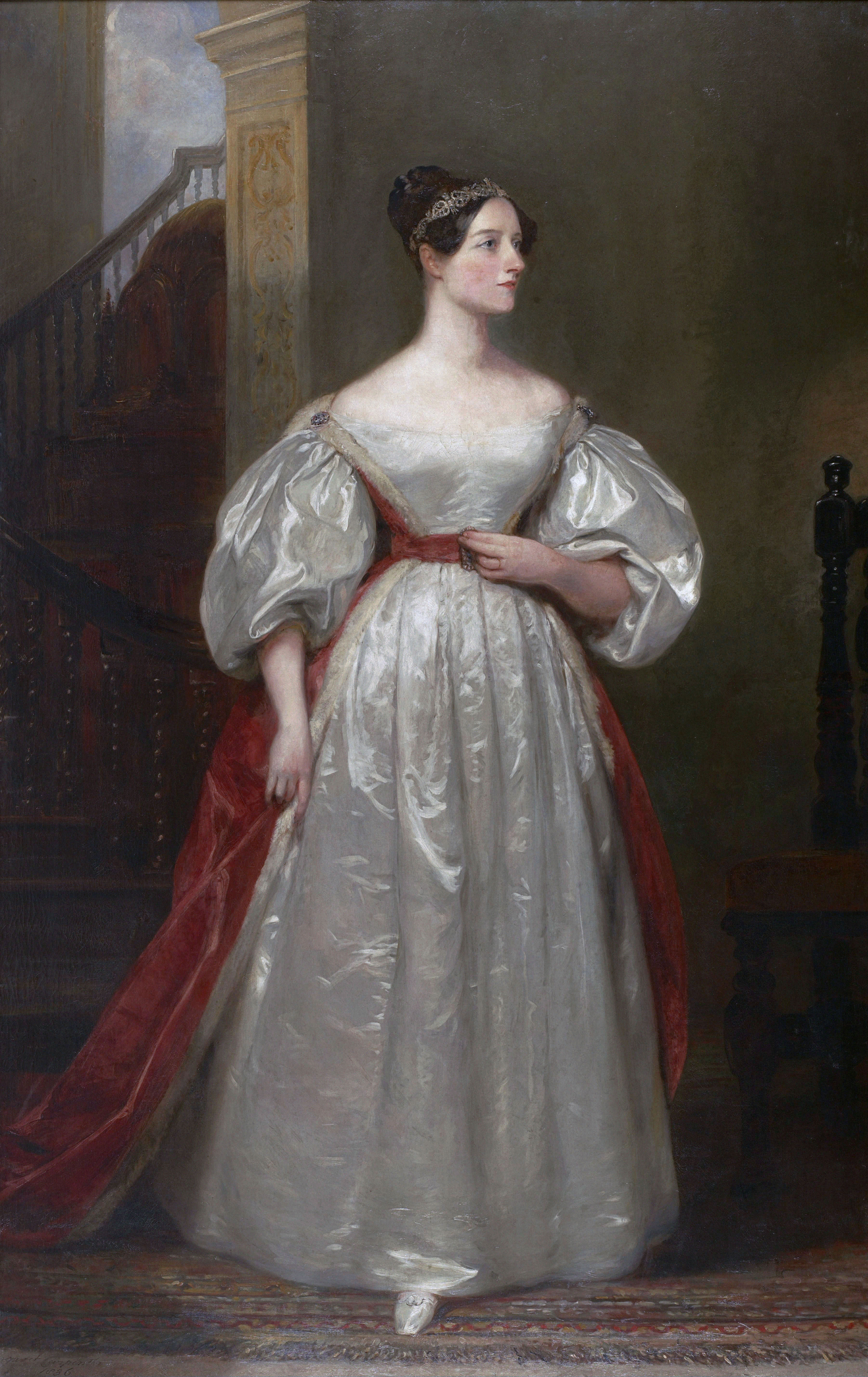
Portrait of Ada Lovelace, 1836

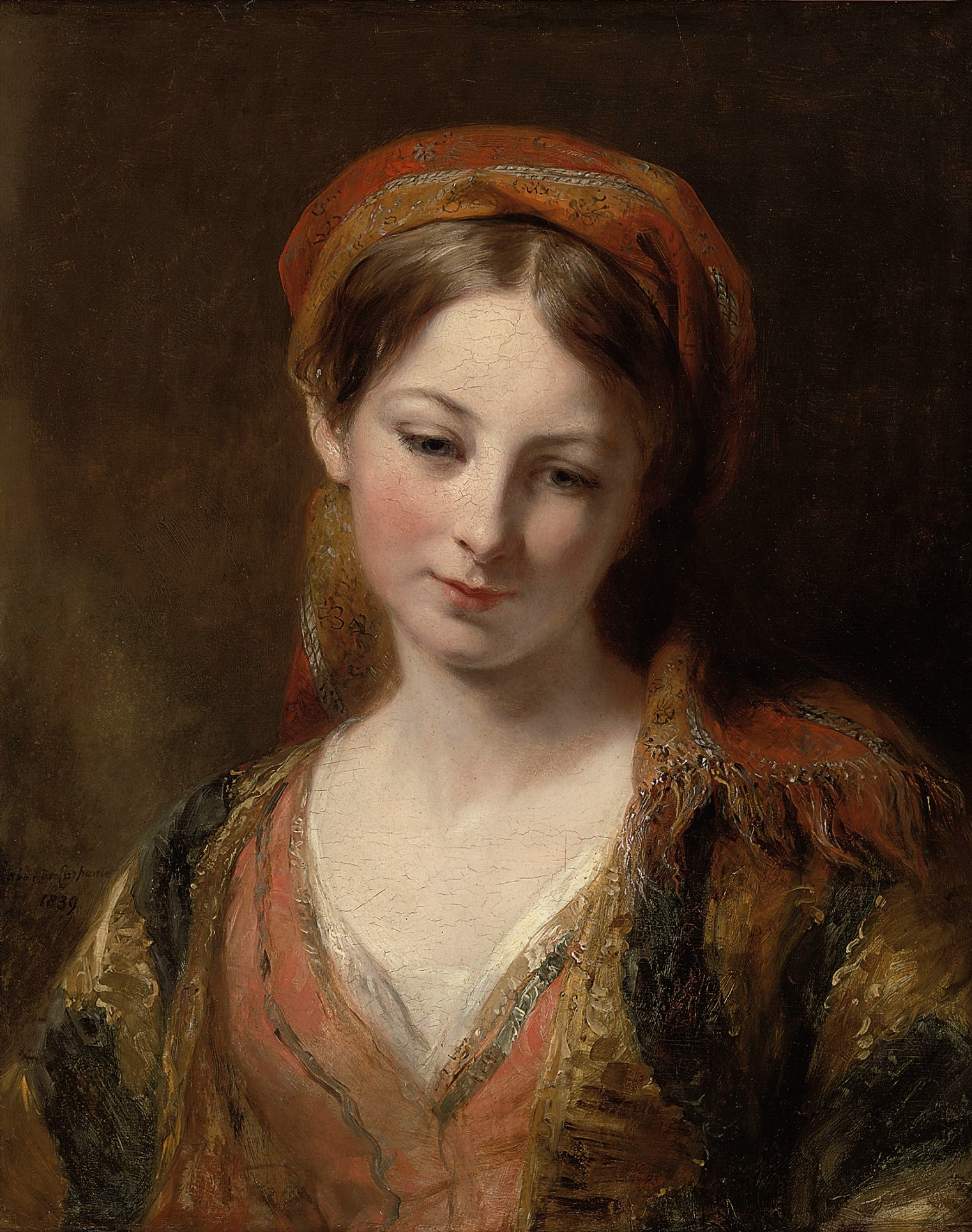
Henrietta Carpenter, 1839

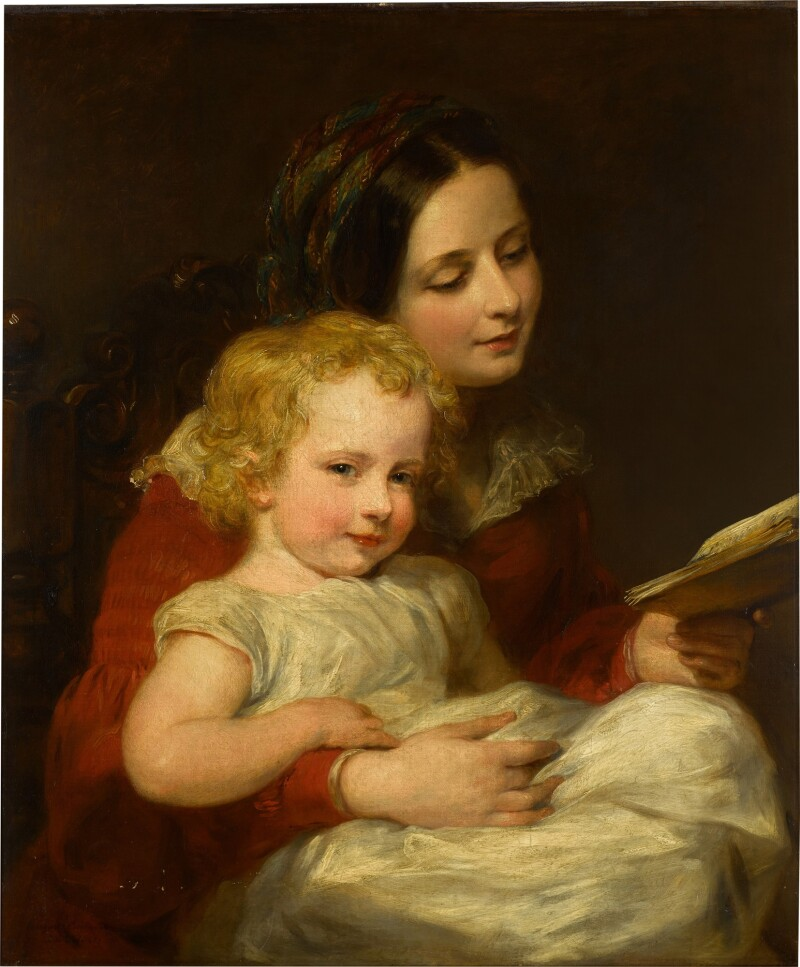
A mother and a child, 1841

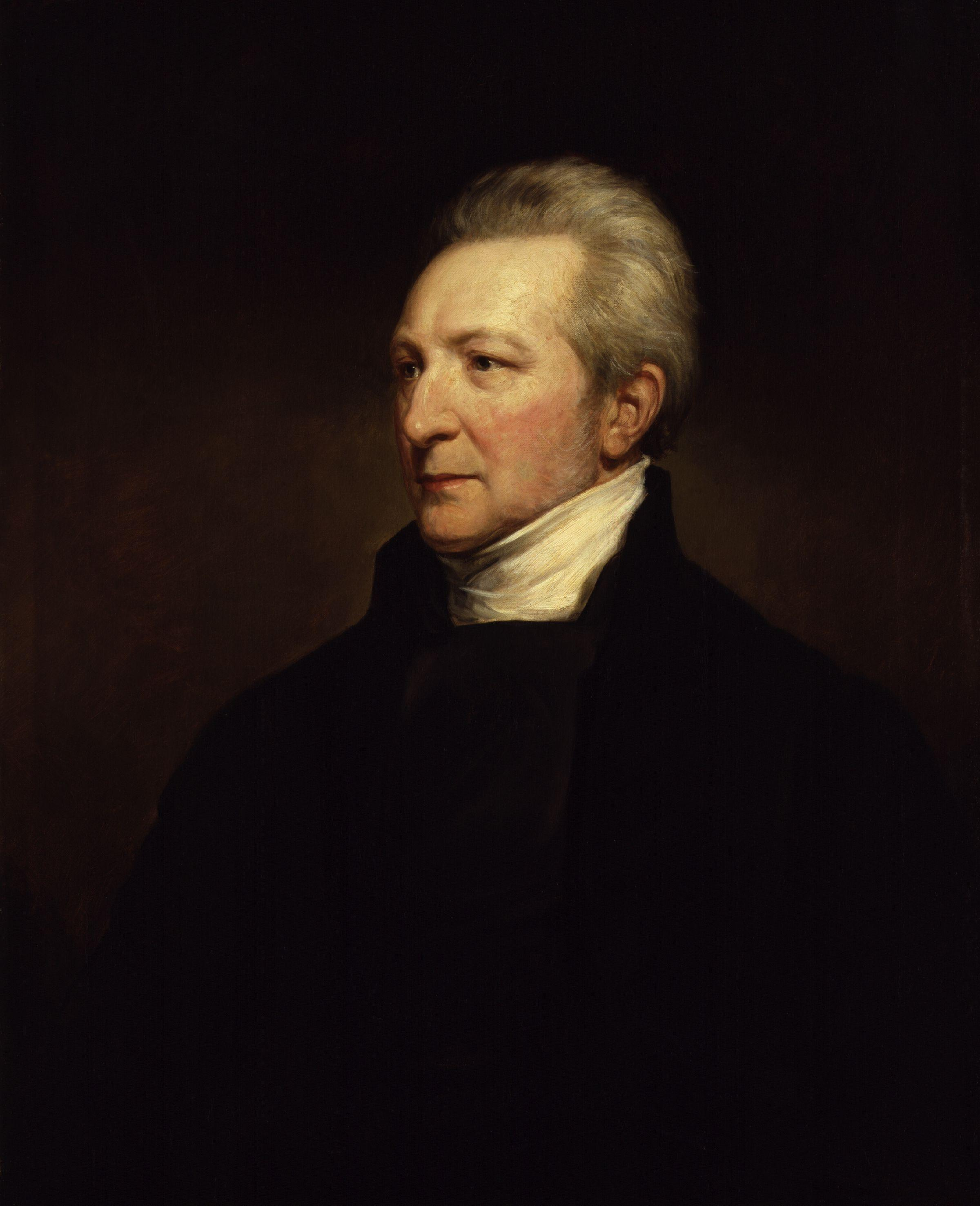
John Bird Sumner, 1852

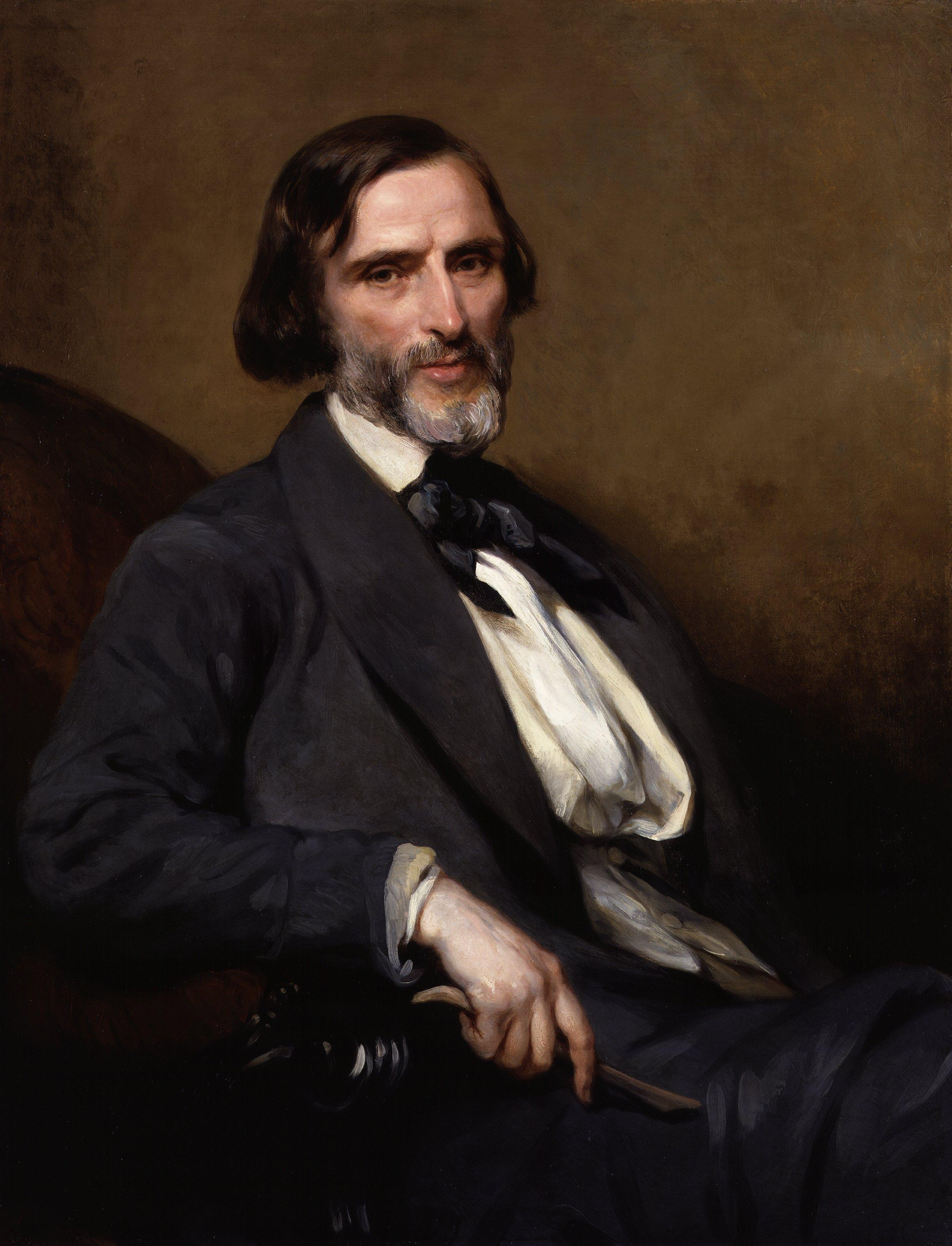
Portrait of John Gibson, 1857

== See also ==
English women painters from the early 19th century who exhibited at the Royal Academy of Art also included

- Sophie Gengembre Anderson
- Joanna Mary Boyce
- Emily Mary Osborn
- Mary Martha Pearson
- Rolinda Sharples
- Rebecca Solomon
- Elizabeth Emma Soyer
- Isabelle de Steiger
- Henrietta Ward
