= Royal Academy Exhibition of 1834 =

1834 art exhibition in London

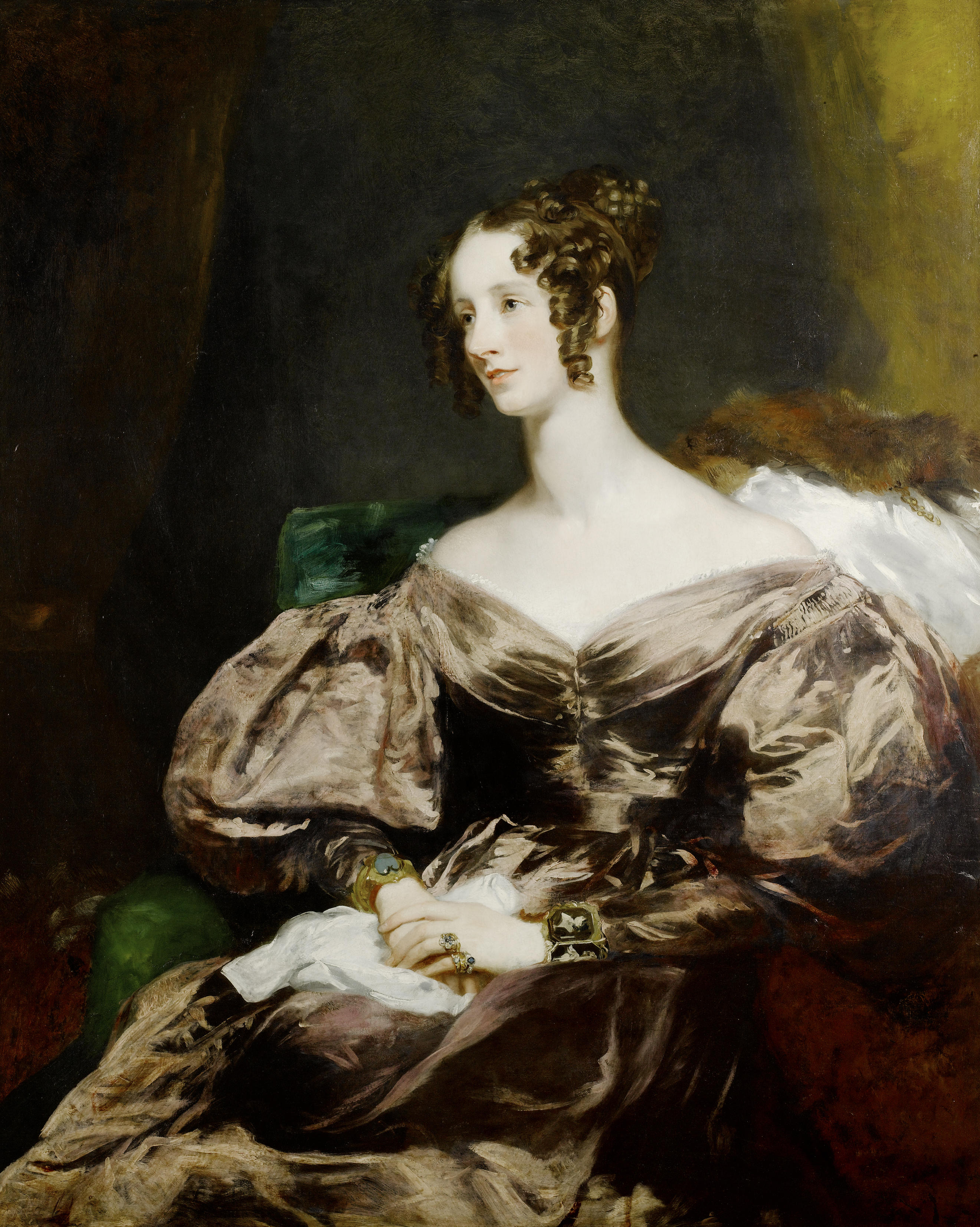
Portrait of Countess Howe by Margaret Sarah Carpenter

The Royal Academy Exhibition of 1834 was the sixty sixth annual Summer Exhibition of the British Royal Academy of Arts. It took place between 5 May and 19 July 1834 at Somerset House in London. It took place during the reign of William IV and featured many painters, sculptors, engravers and architects who had developed their reputations during the Regency era.

The exhibition featured the absence of several number of prominent painters including John Constable and William Mulready. Notable attractions included Edwin Landseer's Bolton Abbey in the Olden Time, set in at a Yorkshire during the medieval era and Daniel Maclise's The Installation of Captain Rock. The latter deployed a mythical rebel Captain Rock reflecting the agrarian unrest in Ireland similar to the English figure Captain Swing.

The President of the Royal Academy Sir Martin Archer Shee displayed several pictures including his Portrait of William IV. Margaret Sarah Carpenter submitted Portrait of Countess Howe. Carpenter was the leading female portraitist of the era but was never elected to membership of the academy.

David Wilkie best known for his genre paintings, two genre works Not at Home and The Spanish Mother as well as four portraits. Amongst them was a picture of the Duke of Wellington dressed as Constable of the Tower. Francis Grant, later a noted portraitist and a future President of the academy, made his debut with two works. He enjoyed great success with his sporting picture The Melton Hunt Breakfast.

== Gallery ==
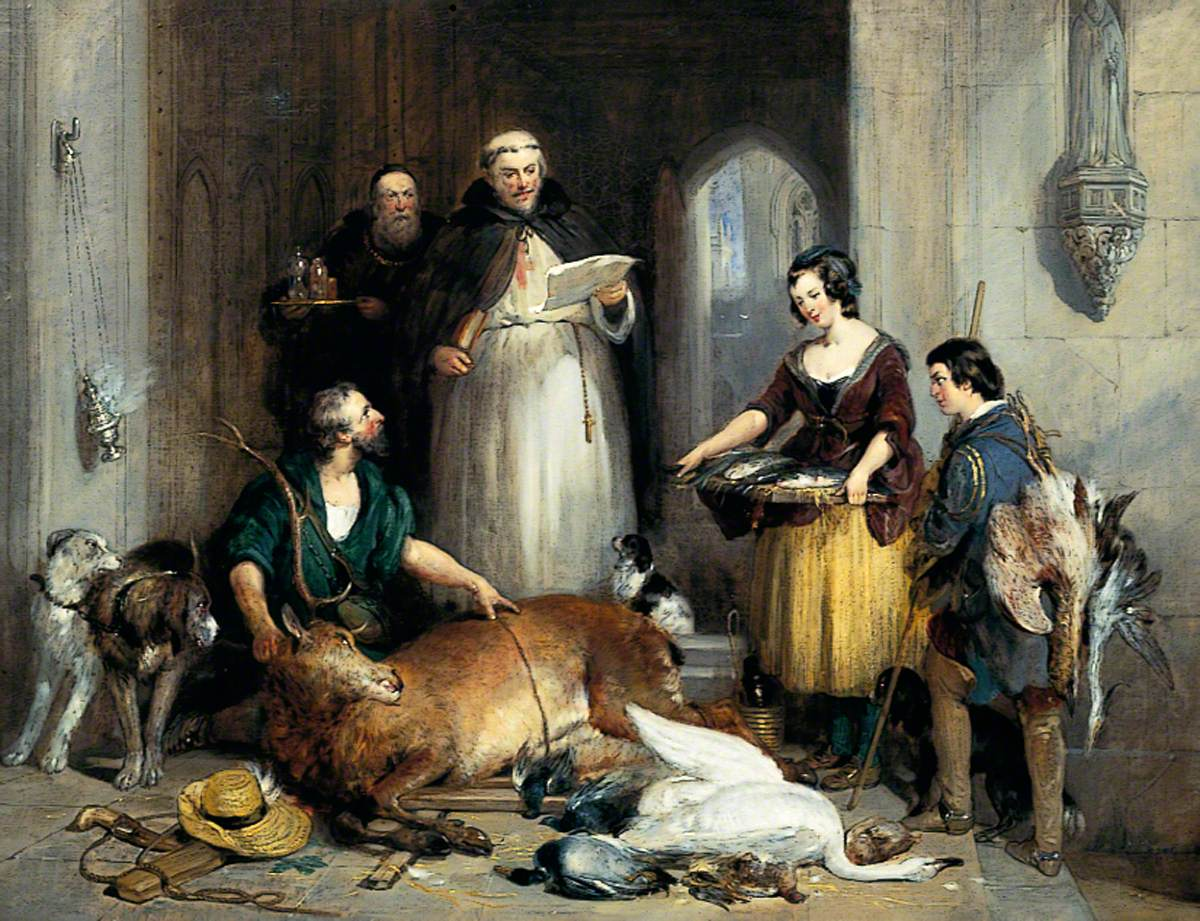
Bolton Abbey in the Olden Time by Edwin Landseer

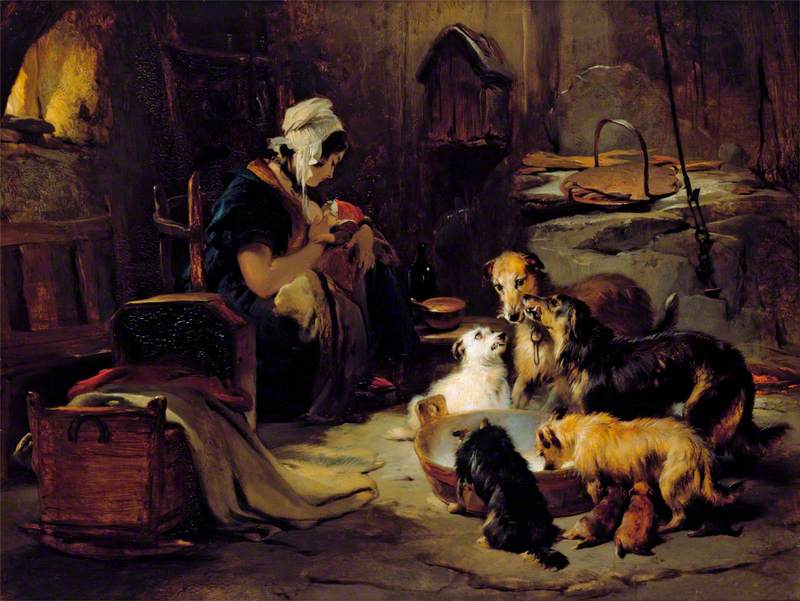
A Highland Breakfast by Edwin Landseer

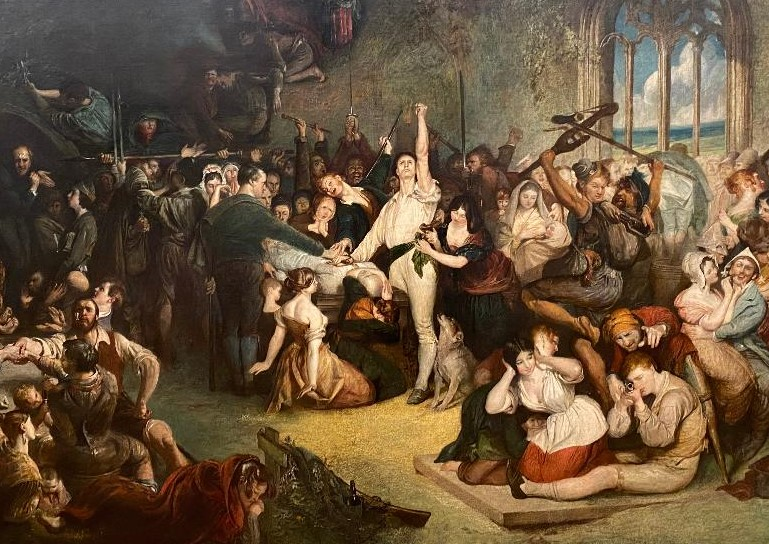
The Installation of Captain Rock by Daniel Maclise

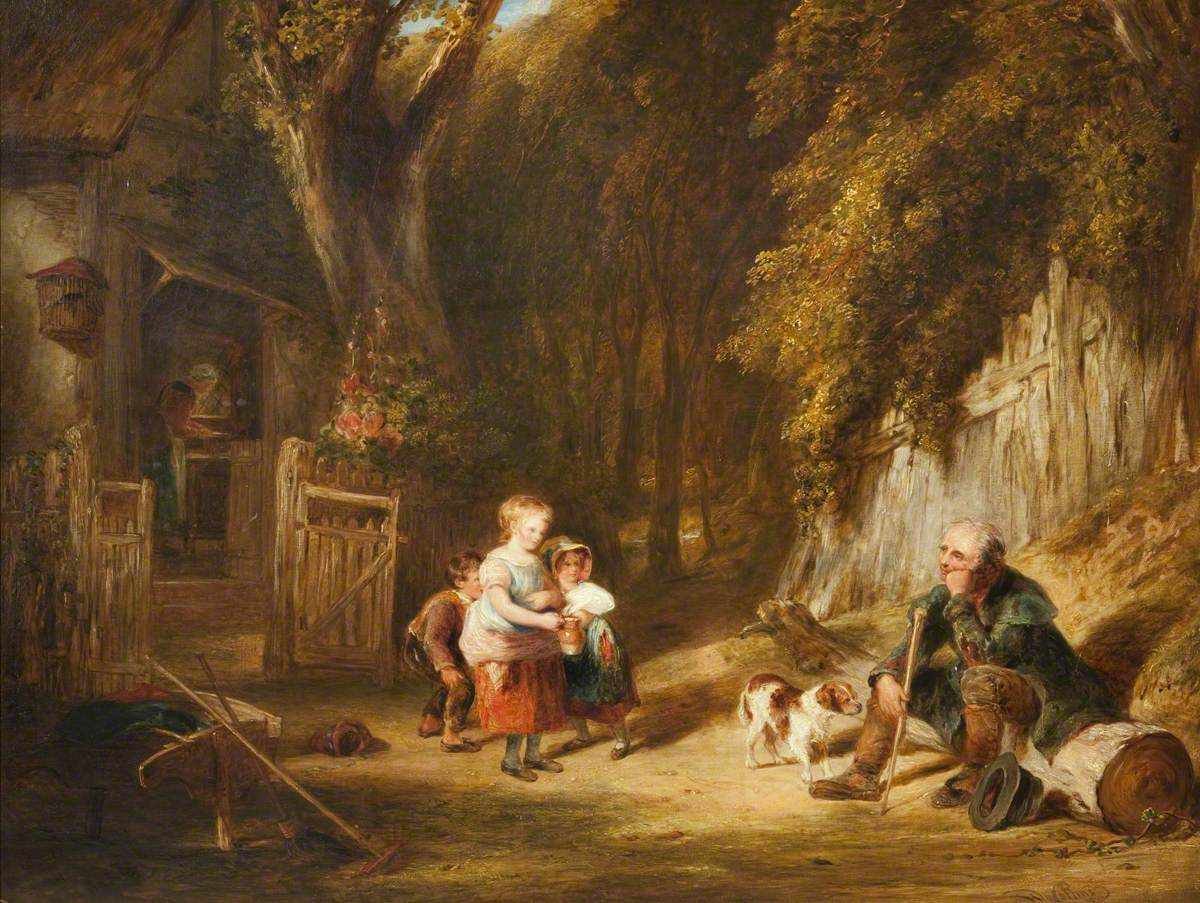
Cottage Hospitality by William Collins

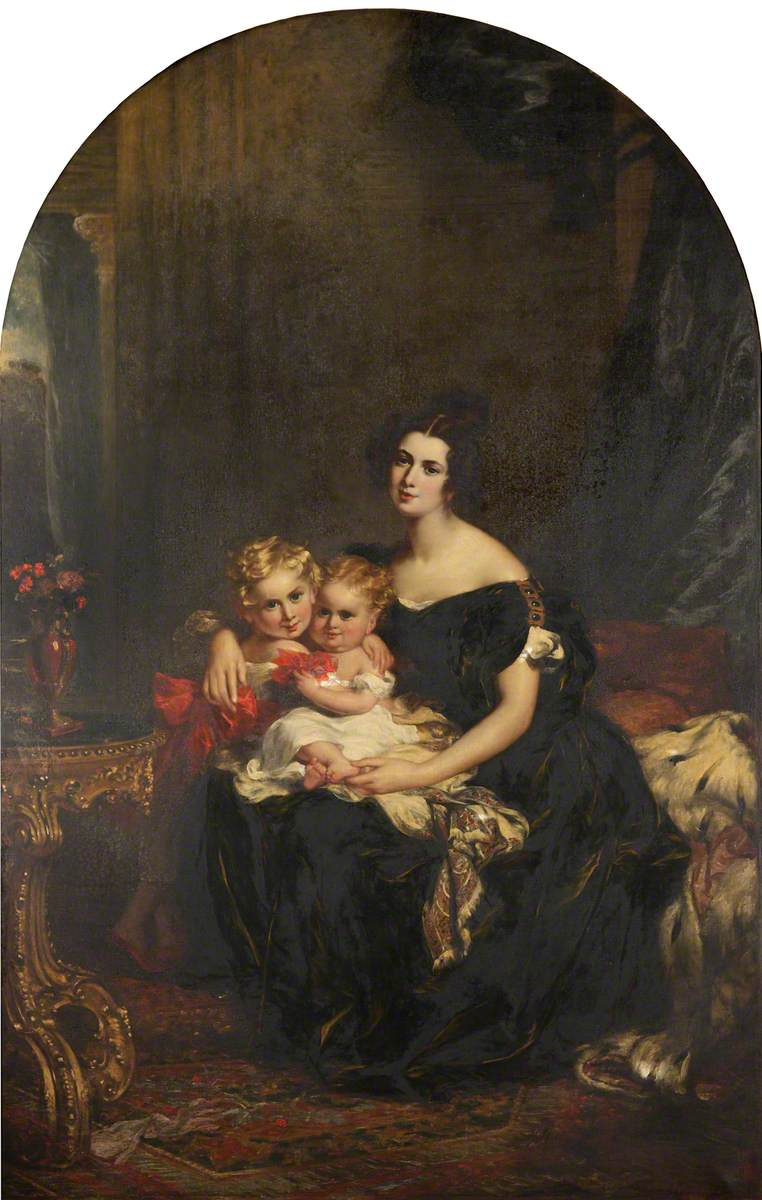
Lady Throckmorton with Her Children by John Partridge

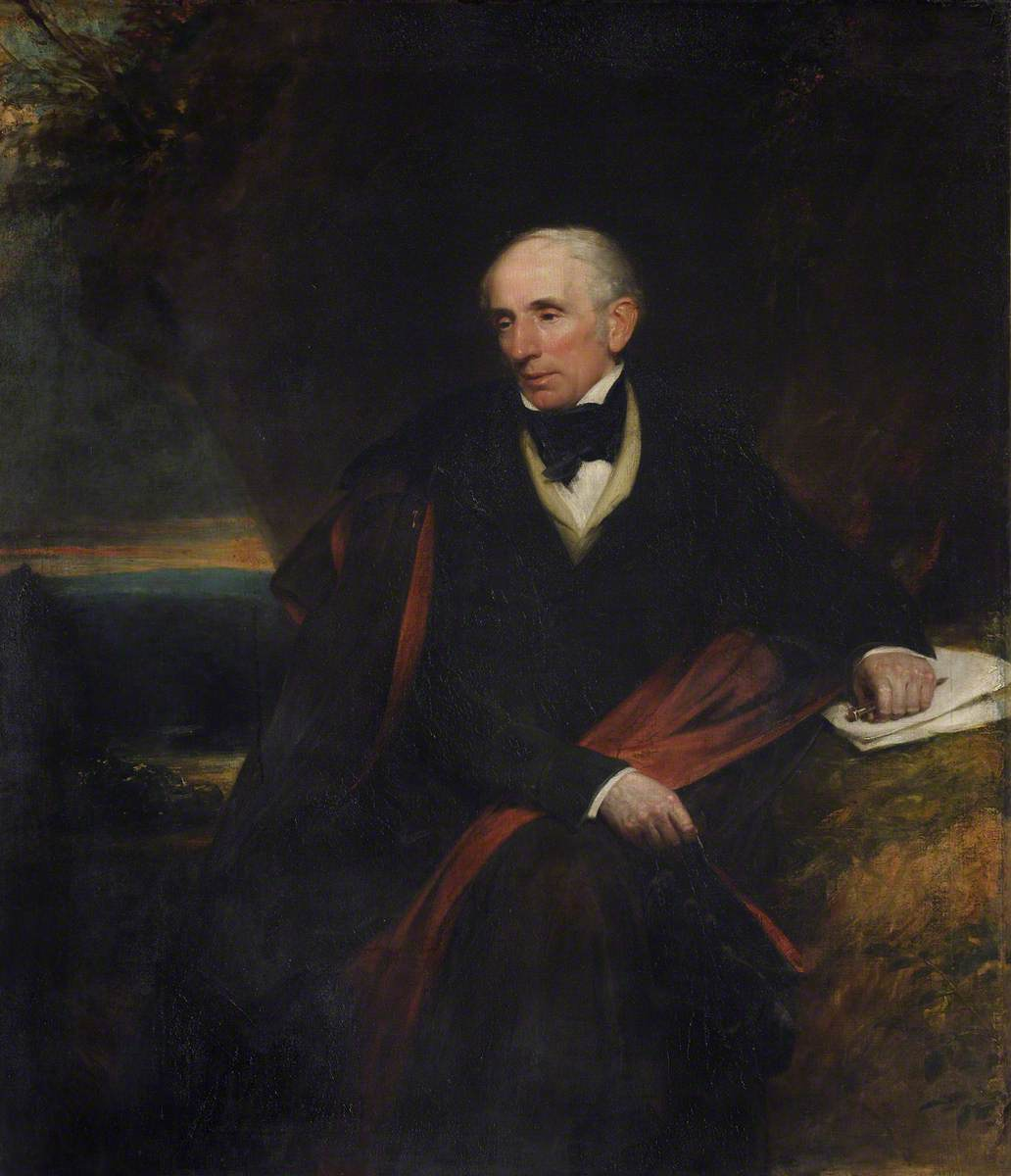
Portrait of William Wordsworth by Henry William Pickersgill

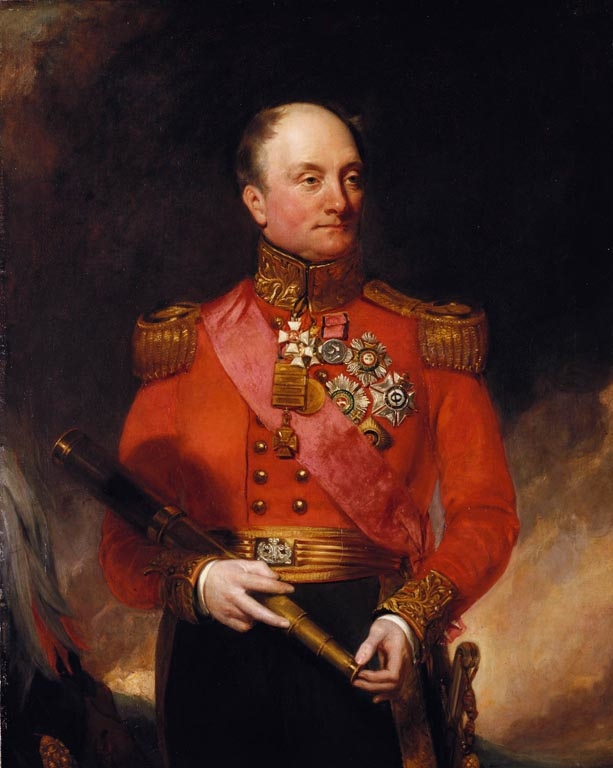
Portrait of Lord Hill by Henry William Pickersgill

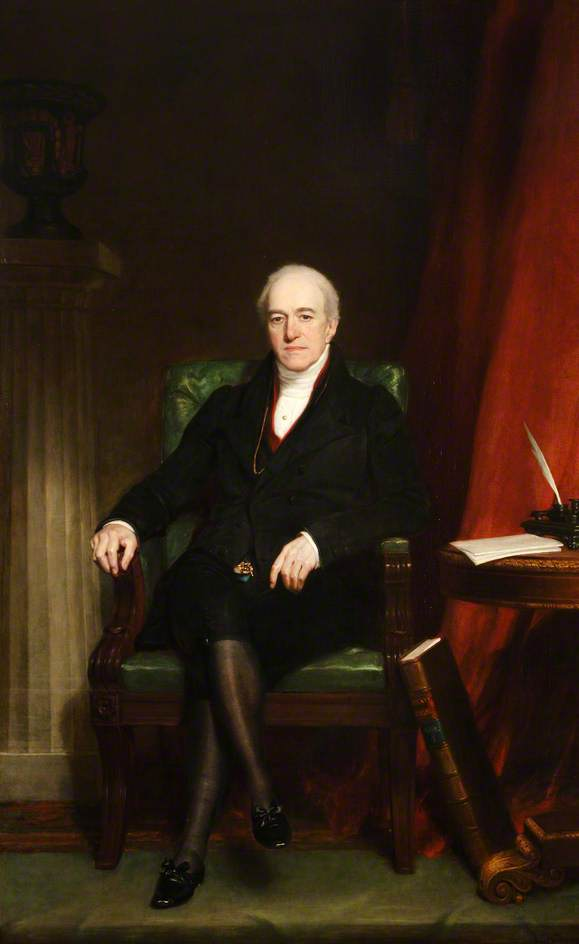
Portrait of Francis Const by Henry William Pickersgill

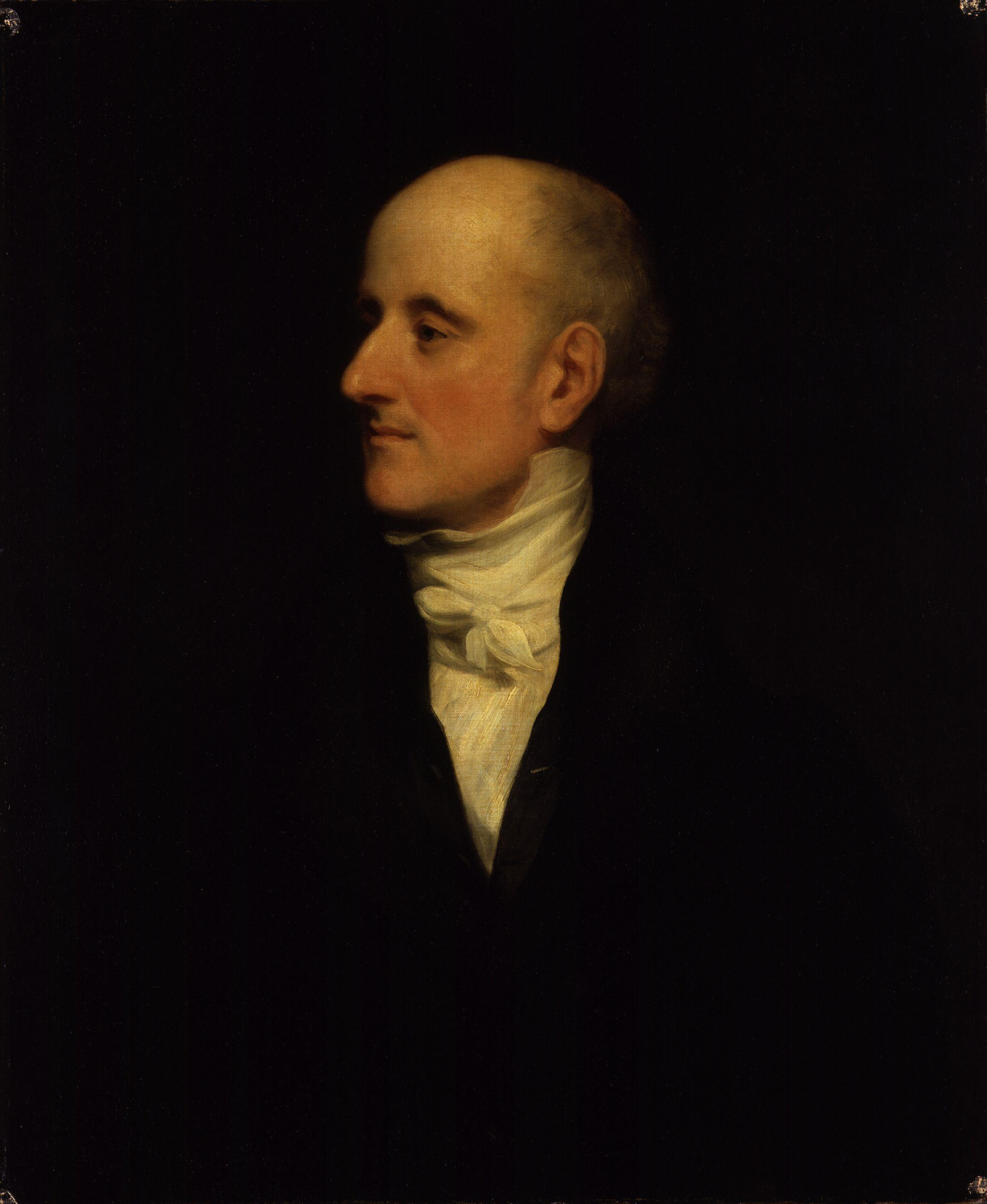
Portrait of Sir Francis Burdett by Thomas Phillips

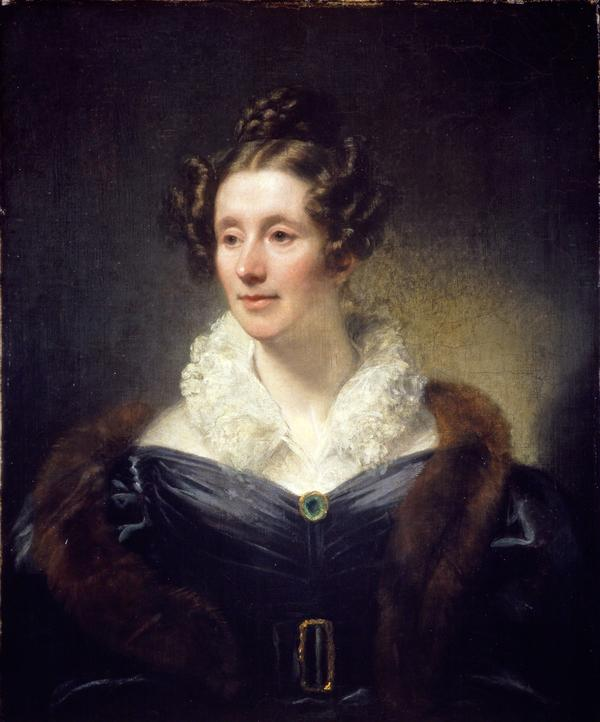
Portrait of Mary Somerville by Thomas Phillips

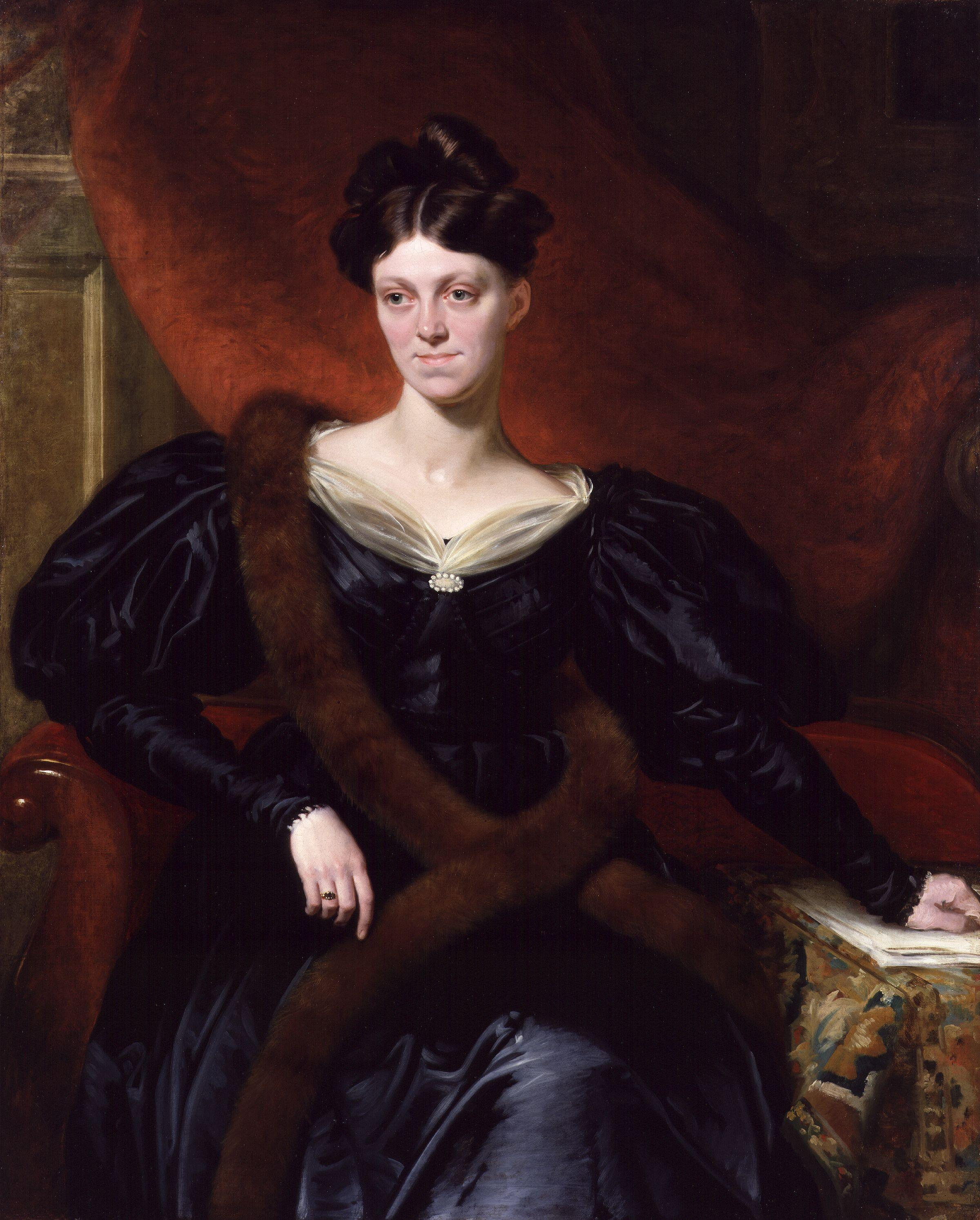
Portrait of Harriet Martineau by Richard Evans

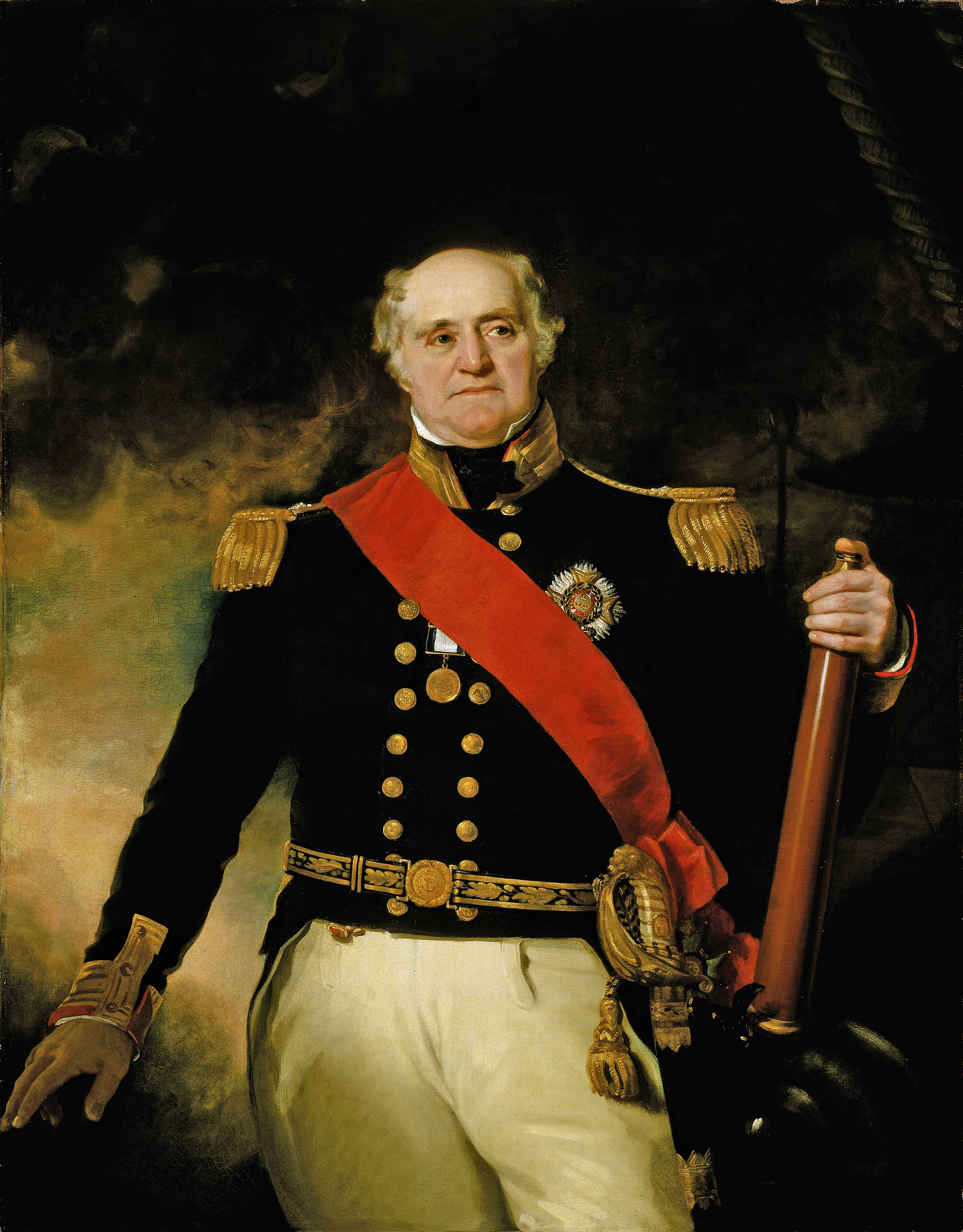
Portrait of Sir Thomas Hardy by Richard Evans

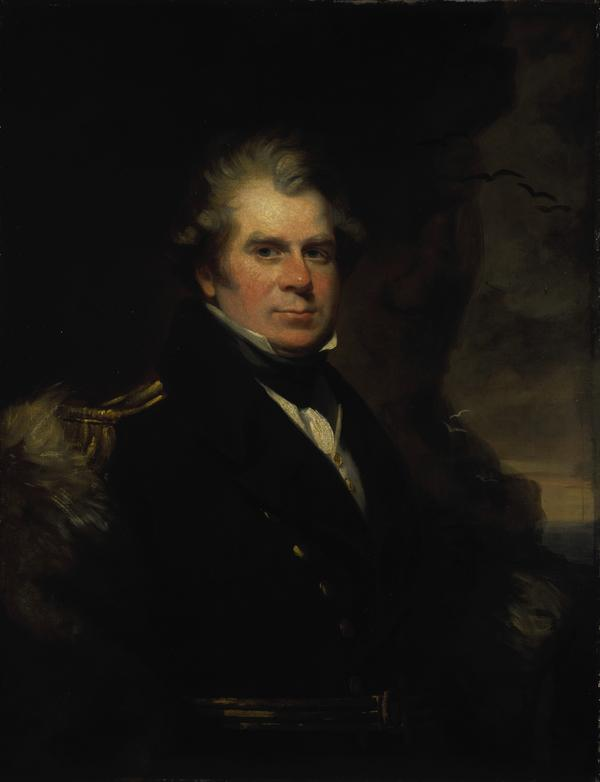
Portrait of John Ross by Benjamin Rawlinson Faulkner

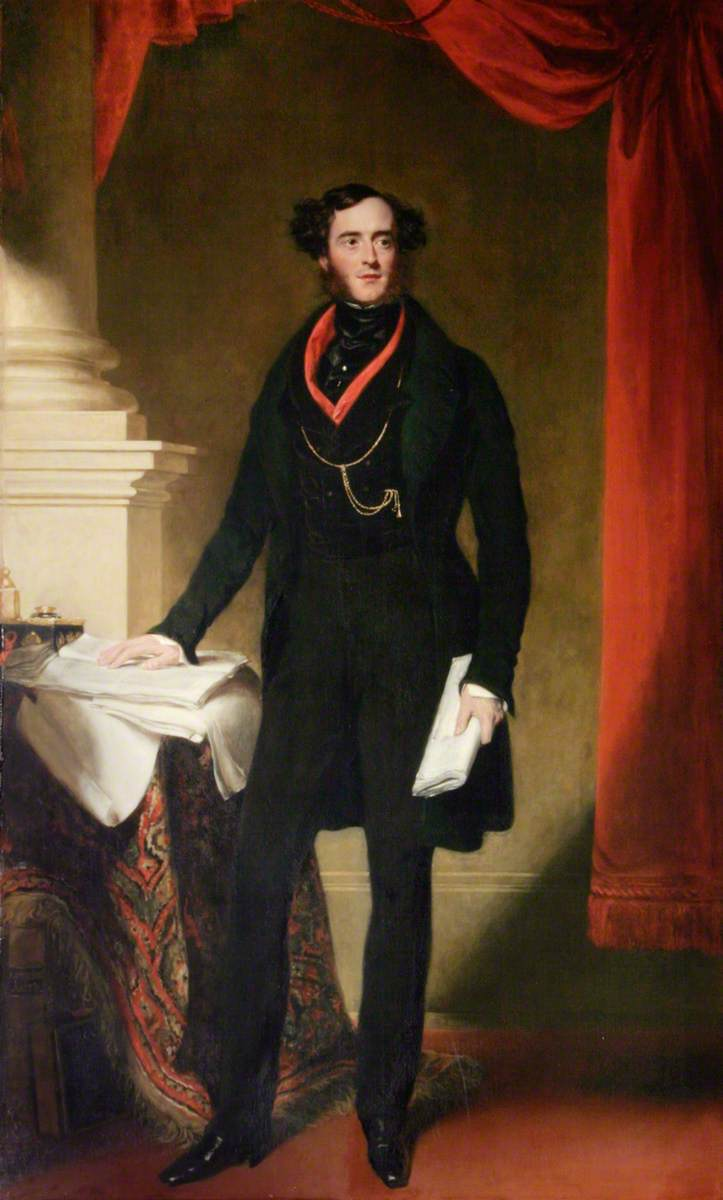
Portrait of Lord George Bentinck by Samuel Lane

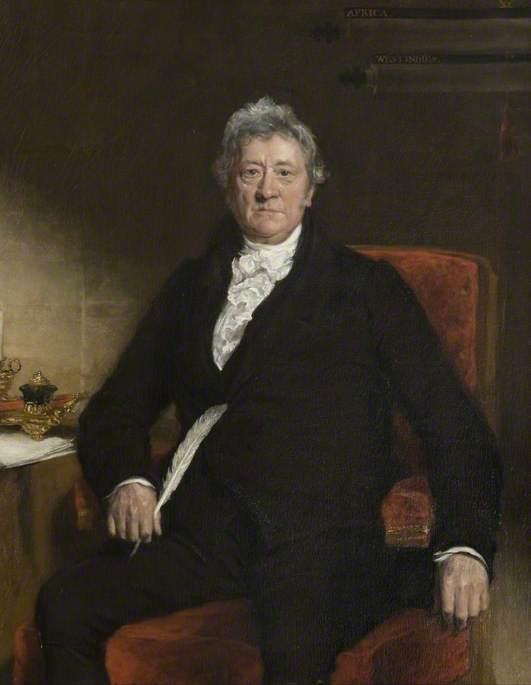
Portrait of Thomas Clarkson by Samuel Lane

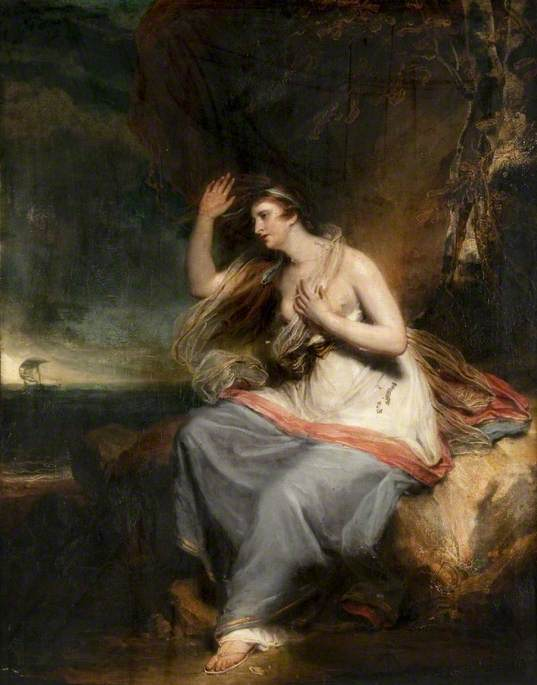
Ariadne by Martin Archer Shee

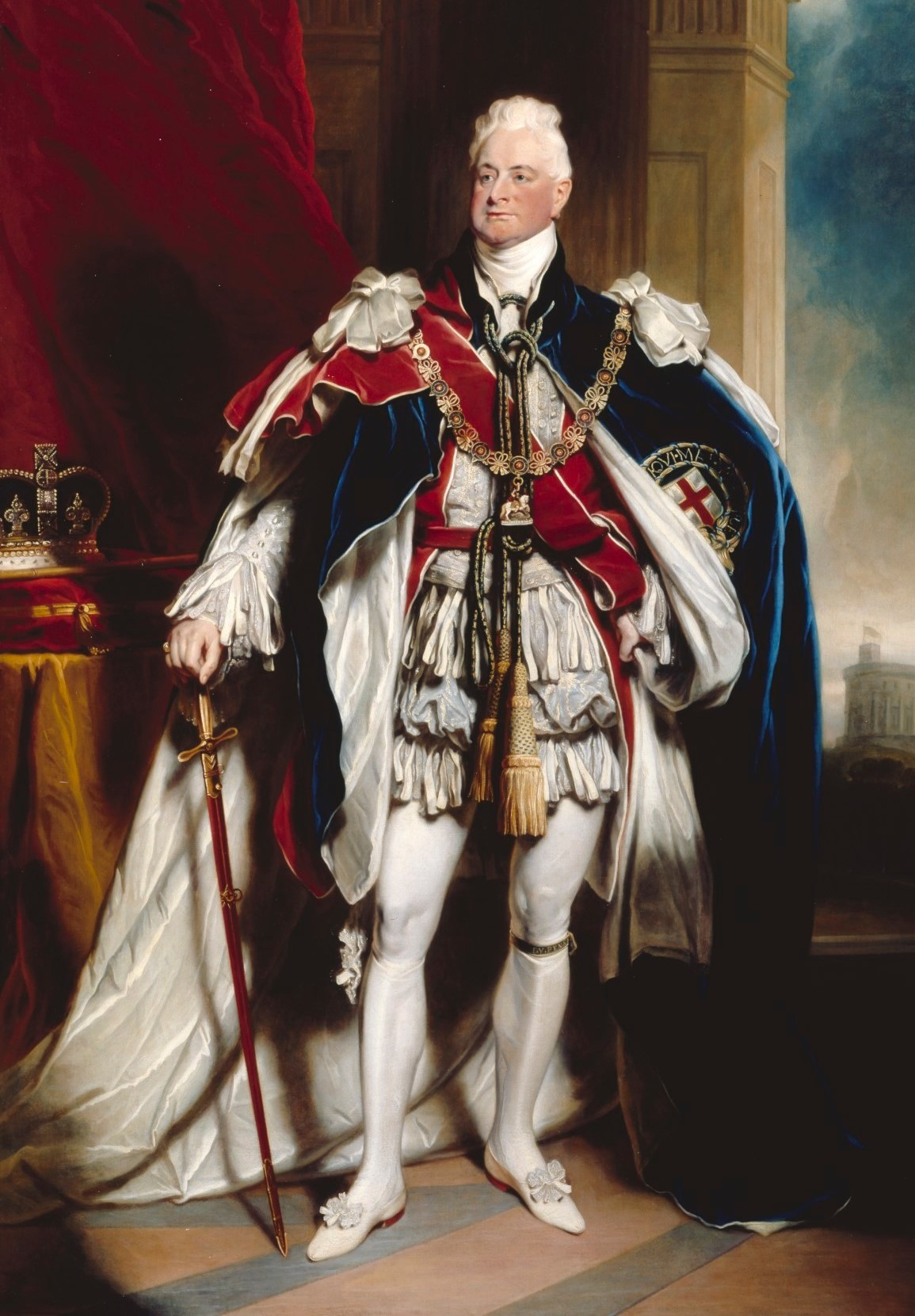
Portrait of William IV by Martin Archer Shee

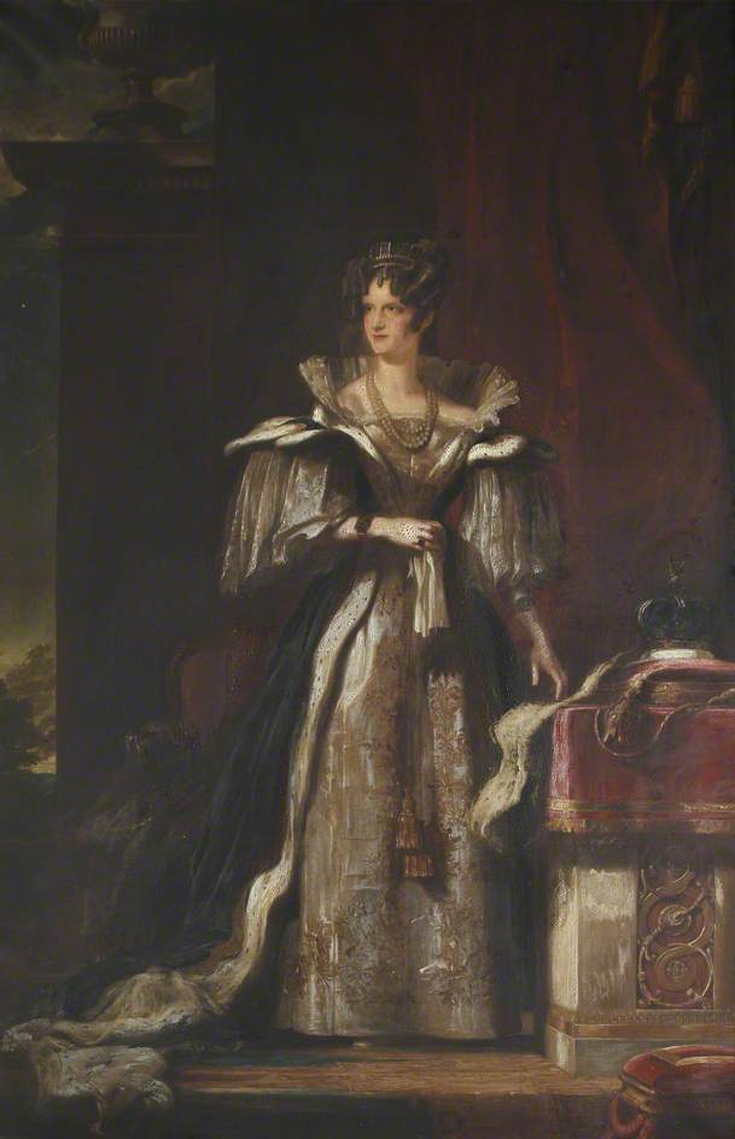
Portrait of Queen Adelaide by David Wilkie

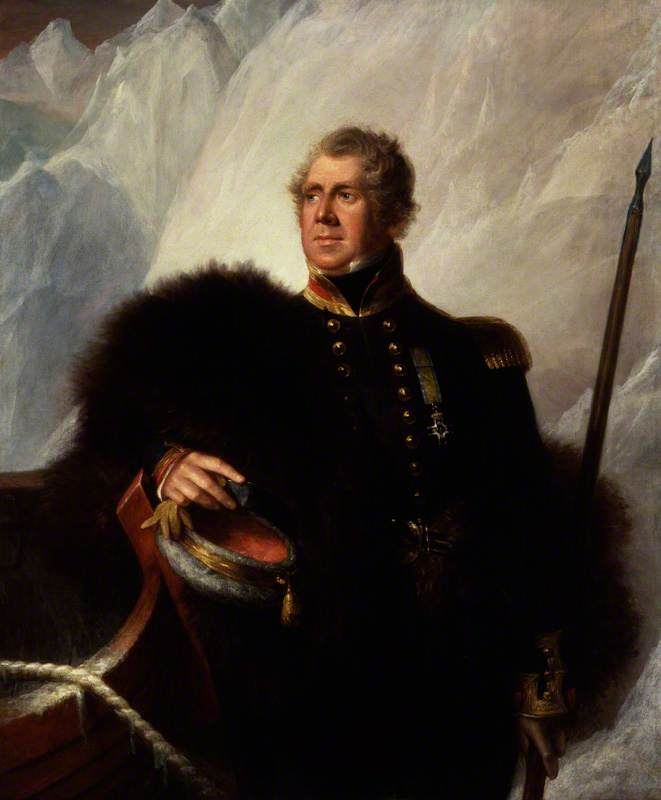
Portrait of John Ross by James Green

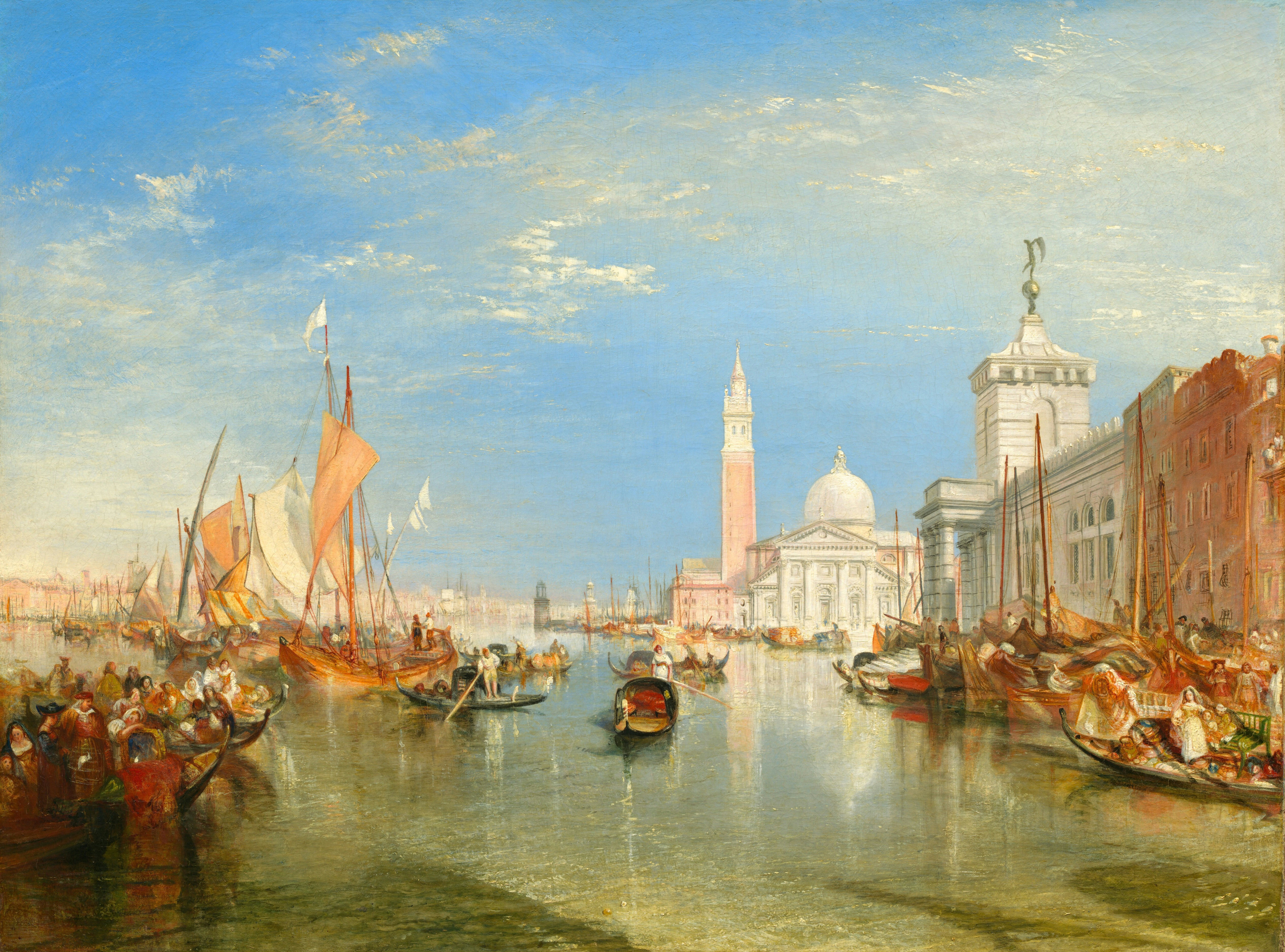
Venice: The Dogana and San Giorgio Maggiore by J.M.W. Turner

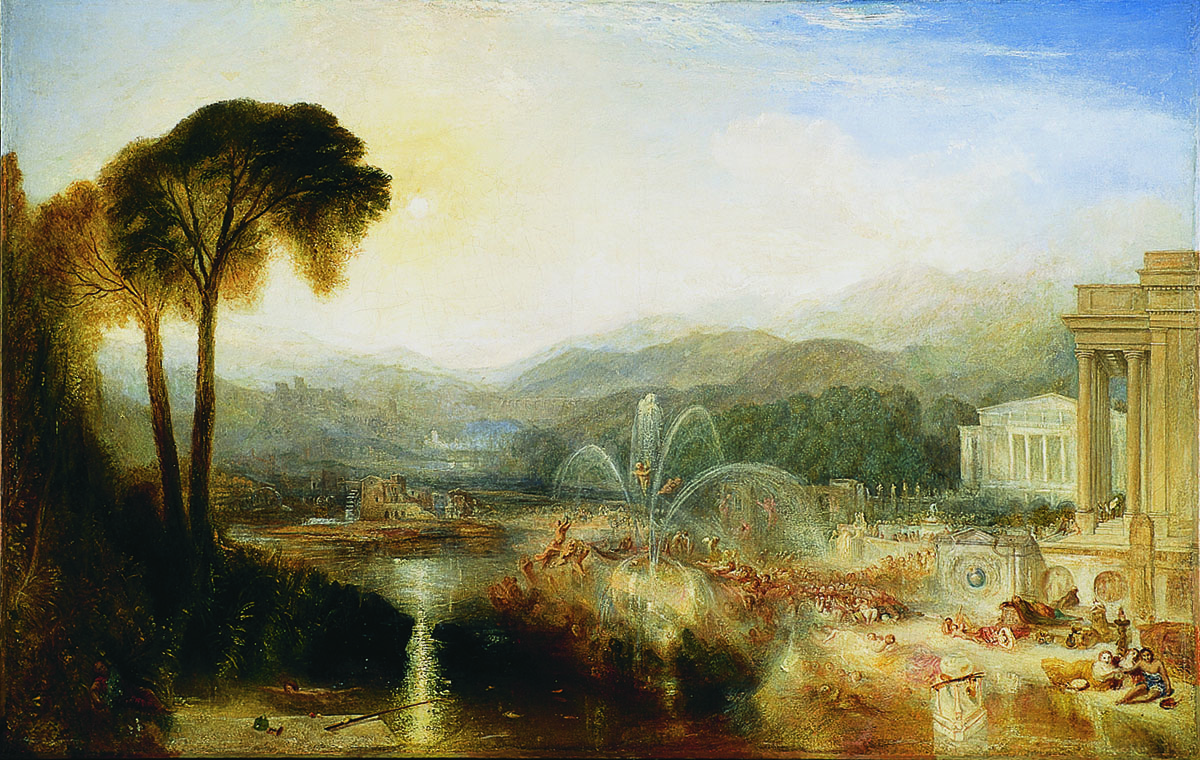
The Fountain of Indolence by J.M.W. Turner

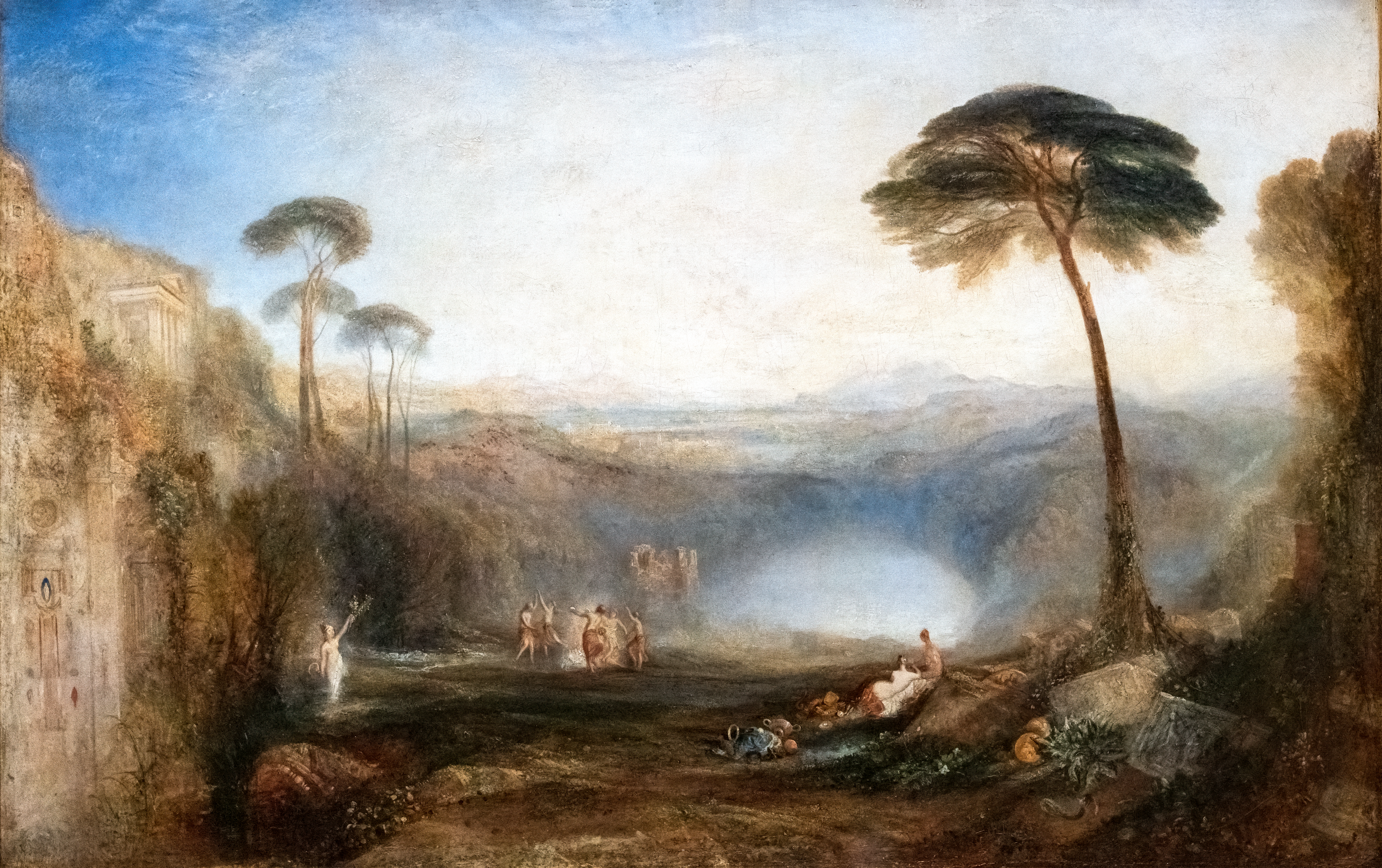
The Golden Bough by J.M.W. Turner

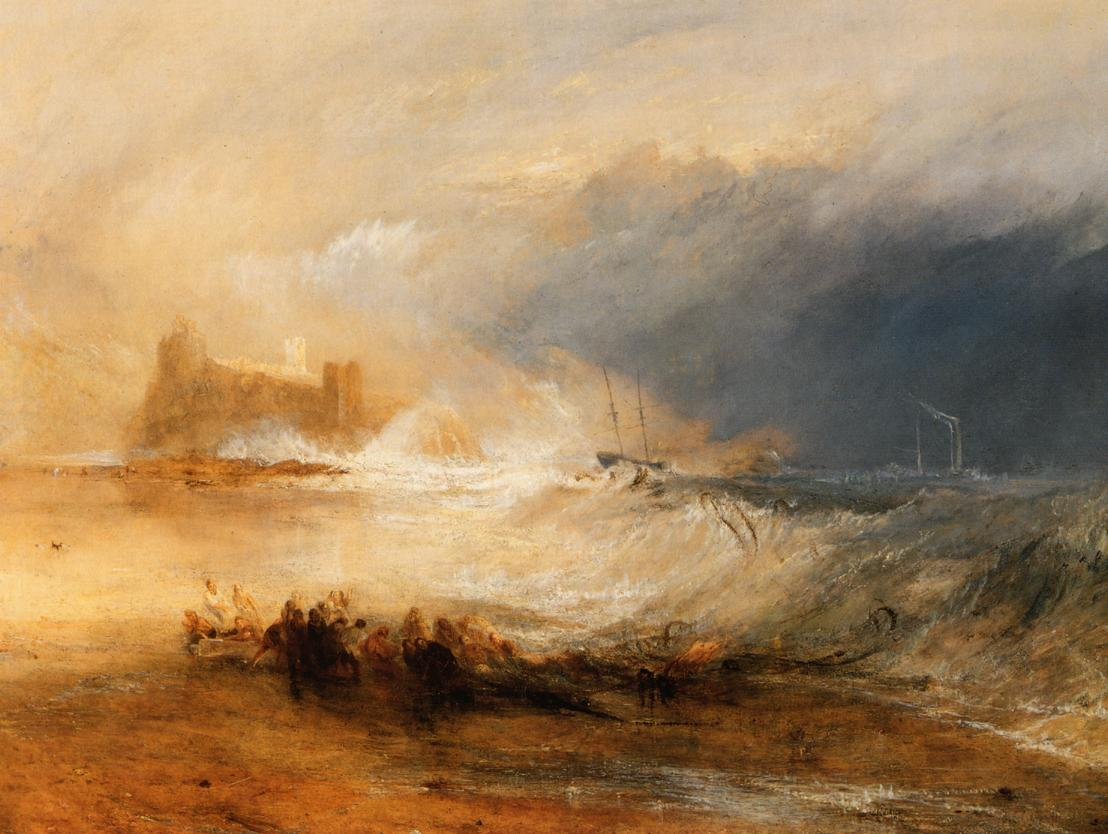
Wreckers, Coast of Northumberland by J.M.W. Turner

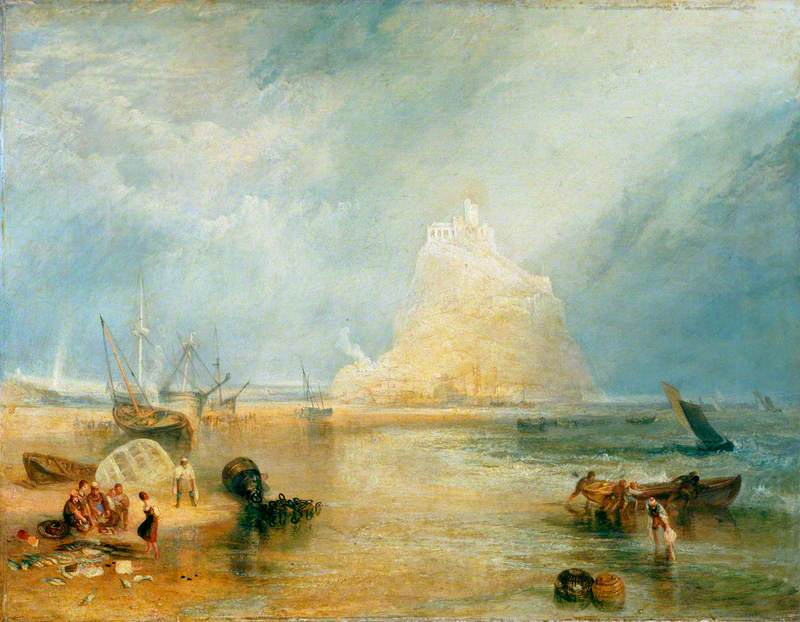
St Michael's Mount, Cornwall by J.M.W. Turner

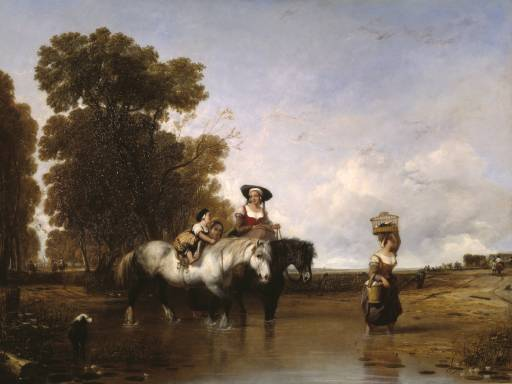
Returning from Market by Augustus Wall Callcott

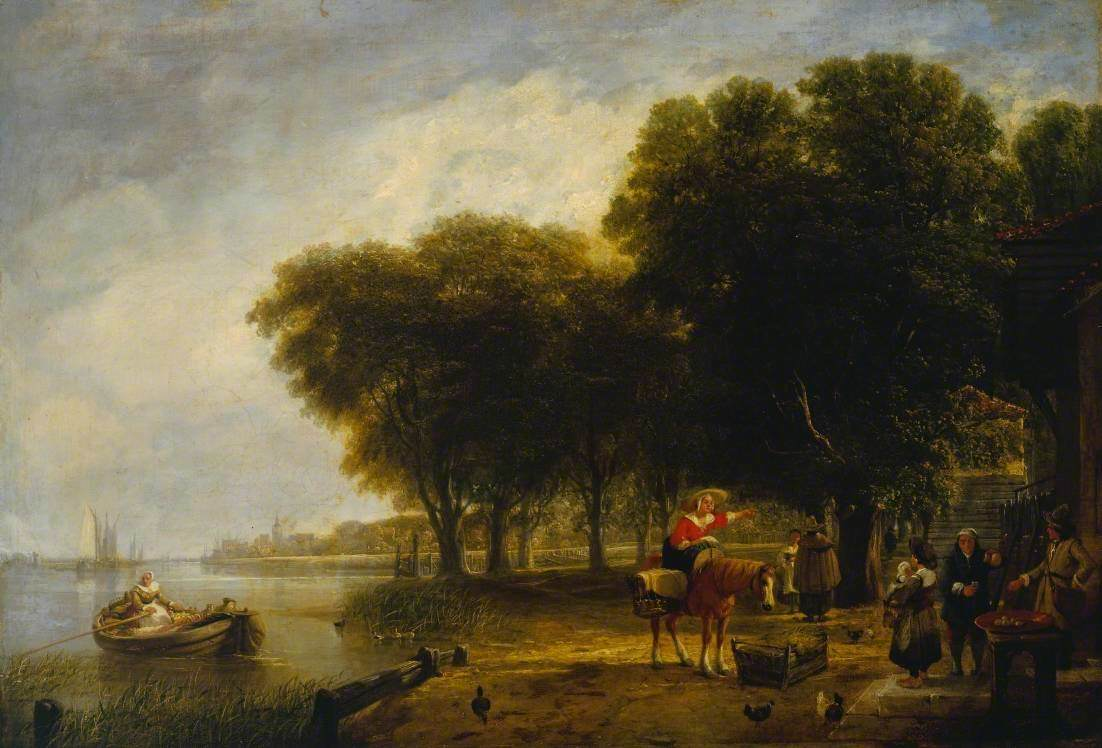
Dutch Peasants Waiting the Return of the Passage Boat by Augustus Wall Callcott

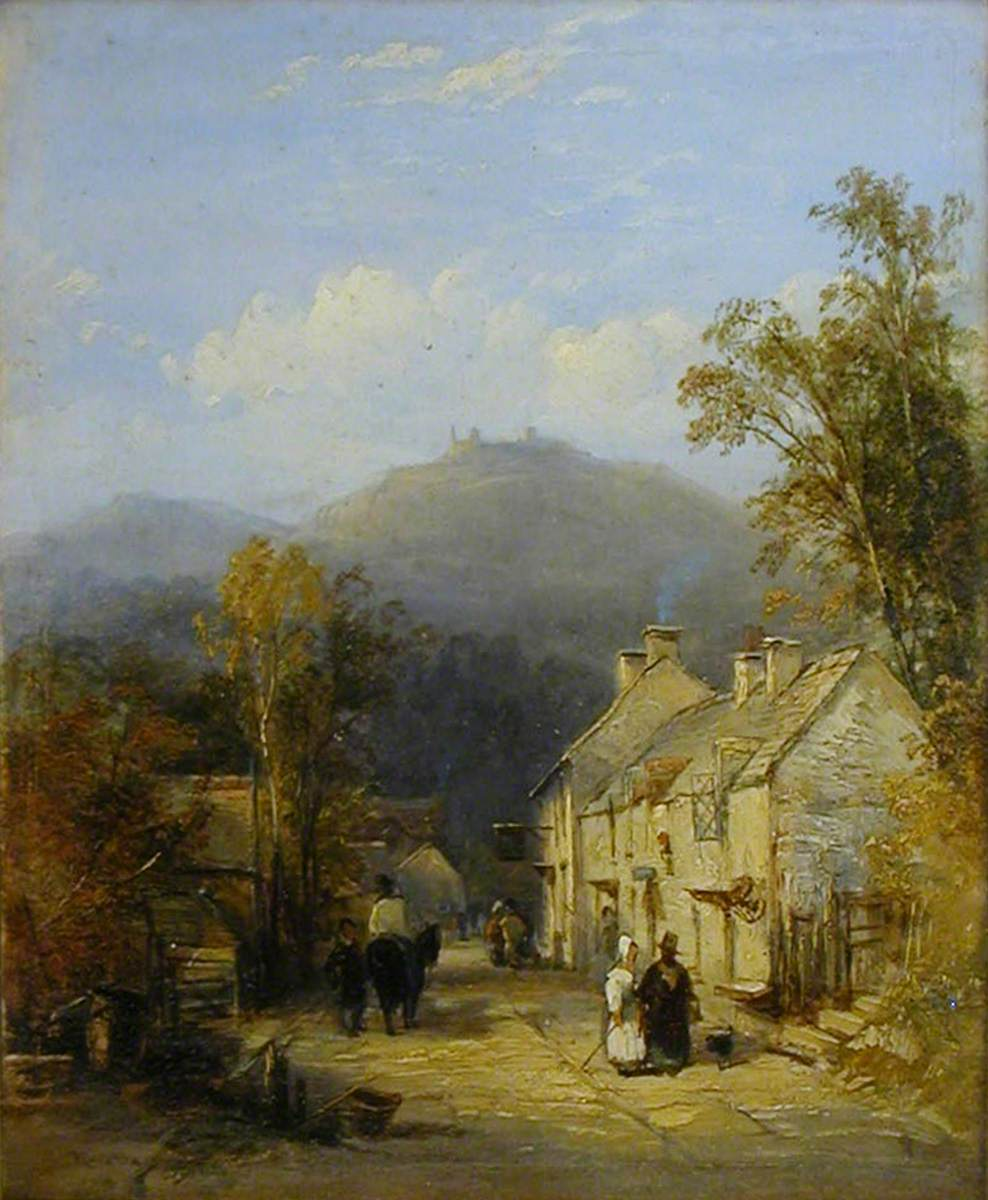
Street Scene, Llangollen by Thomas Creswick

The Yeldham Oak by James Ward

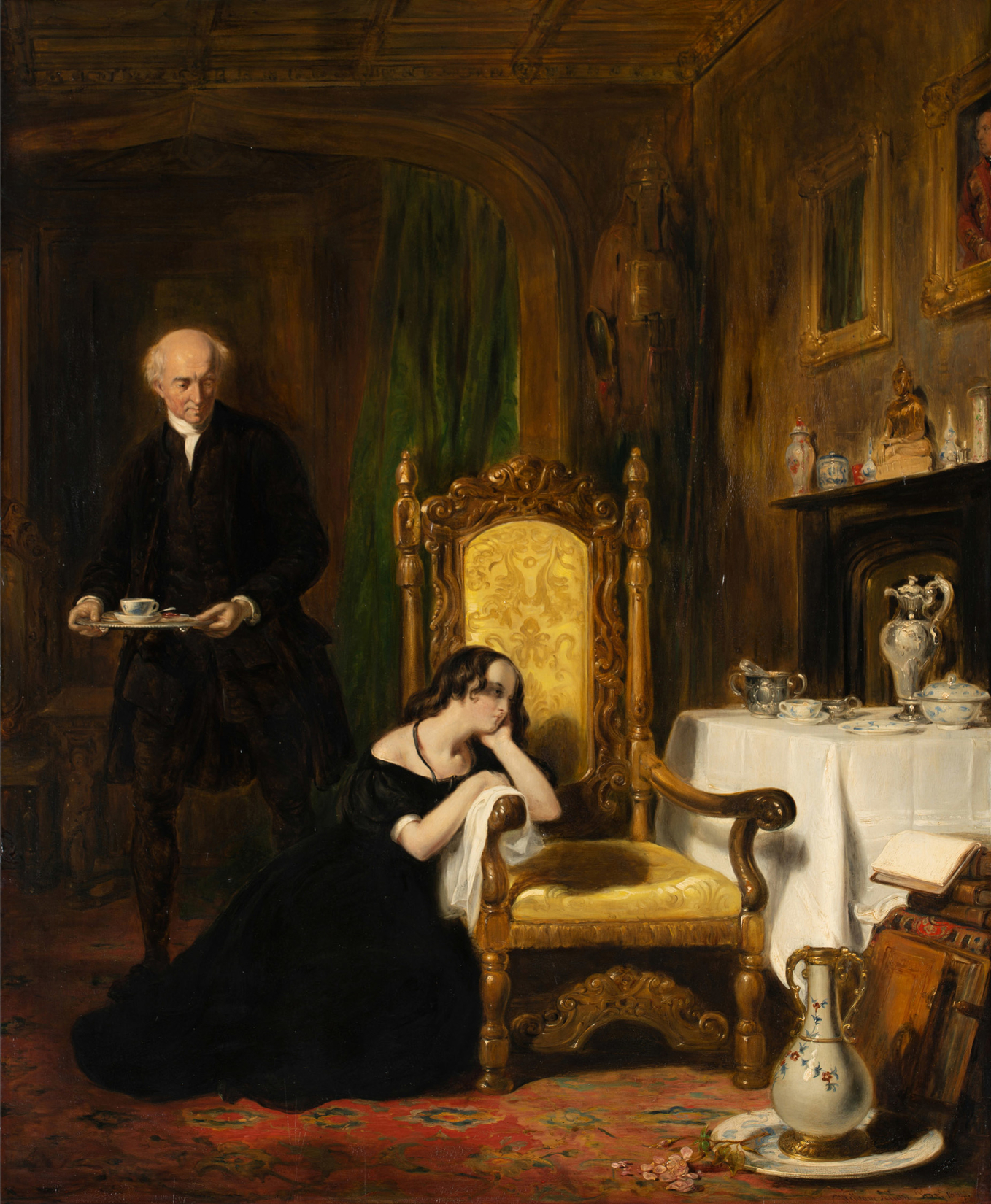
The Orphan by William Allan

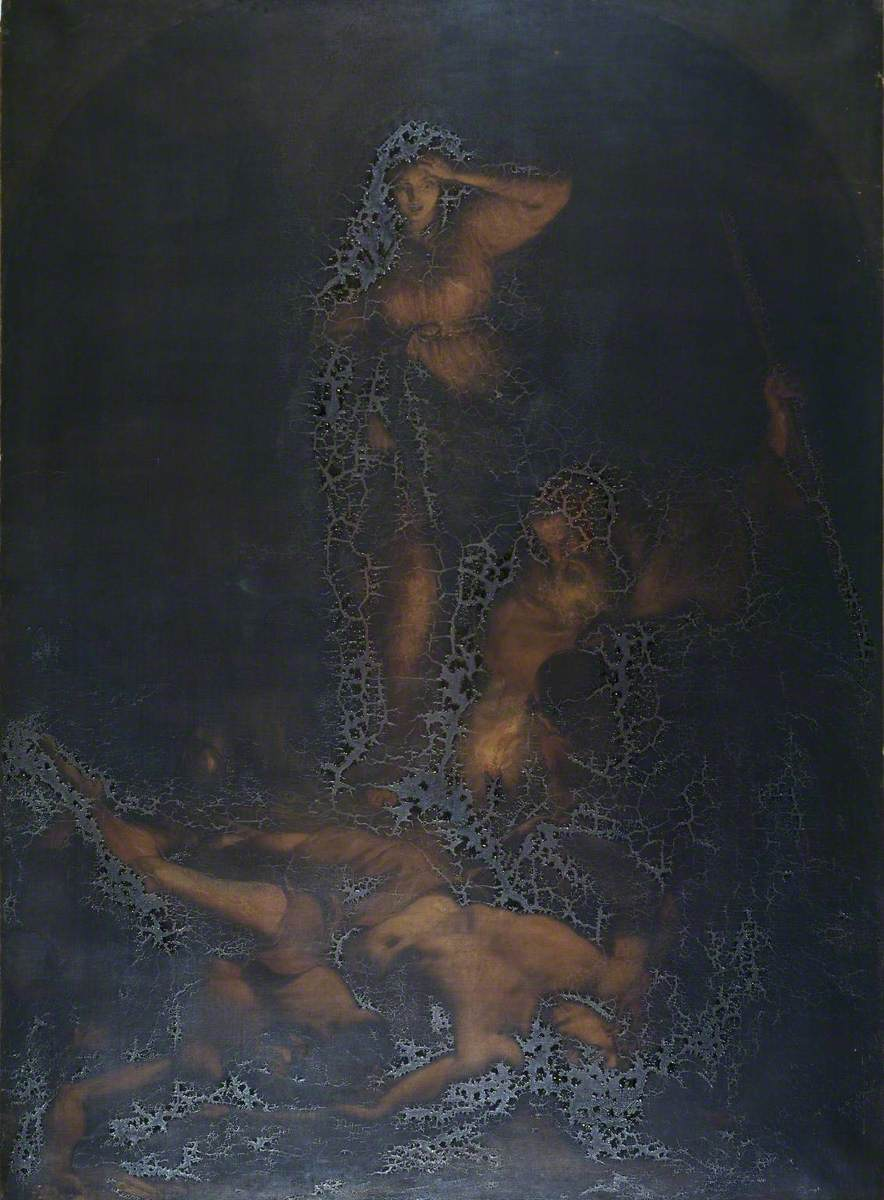
Editha and the Monks Searching for the Body of Harold by William Hilton

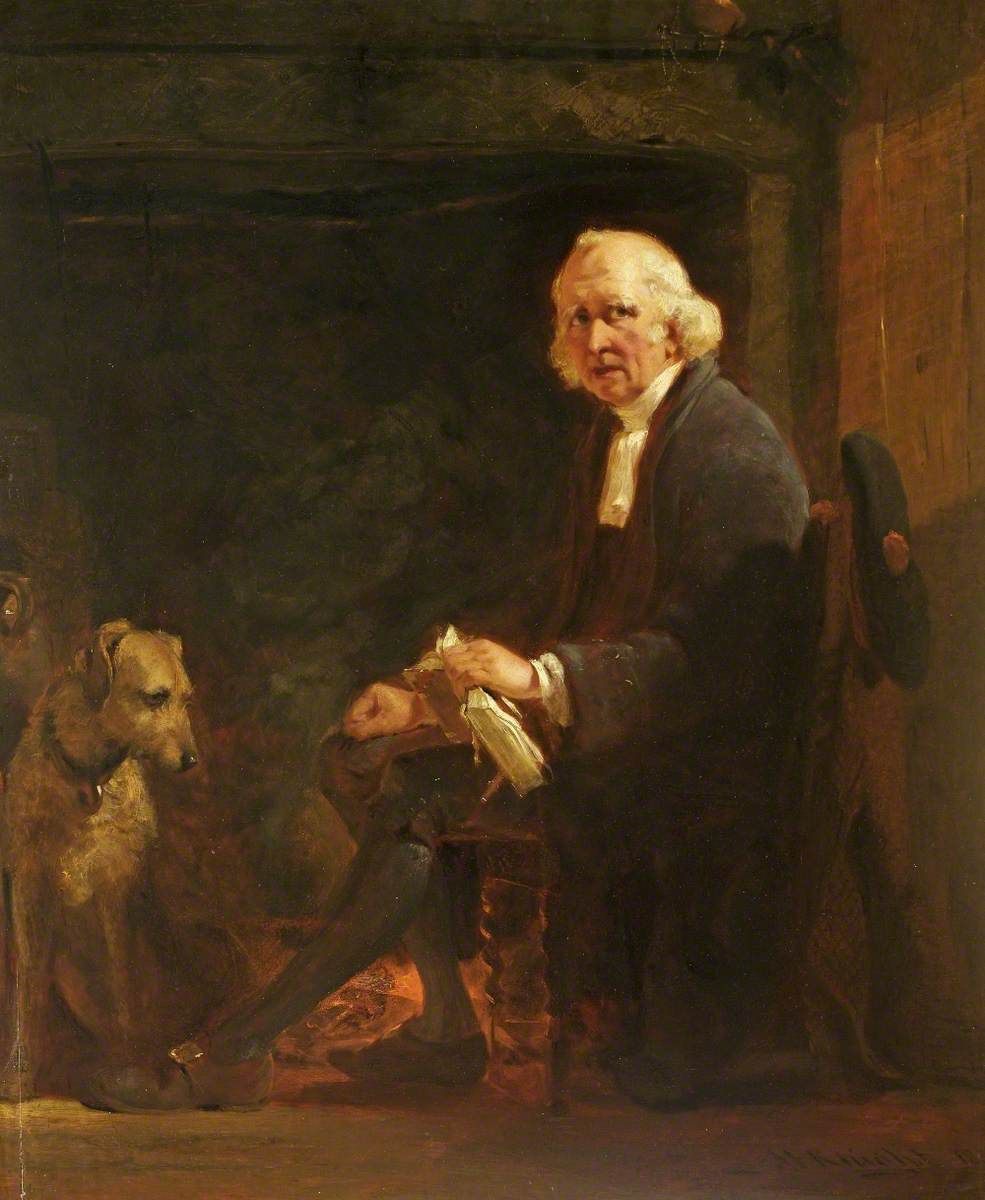
David Deans by John Prescott Knight

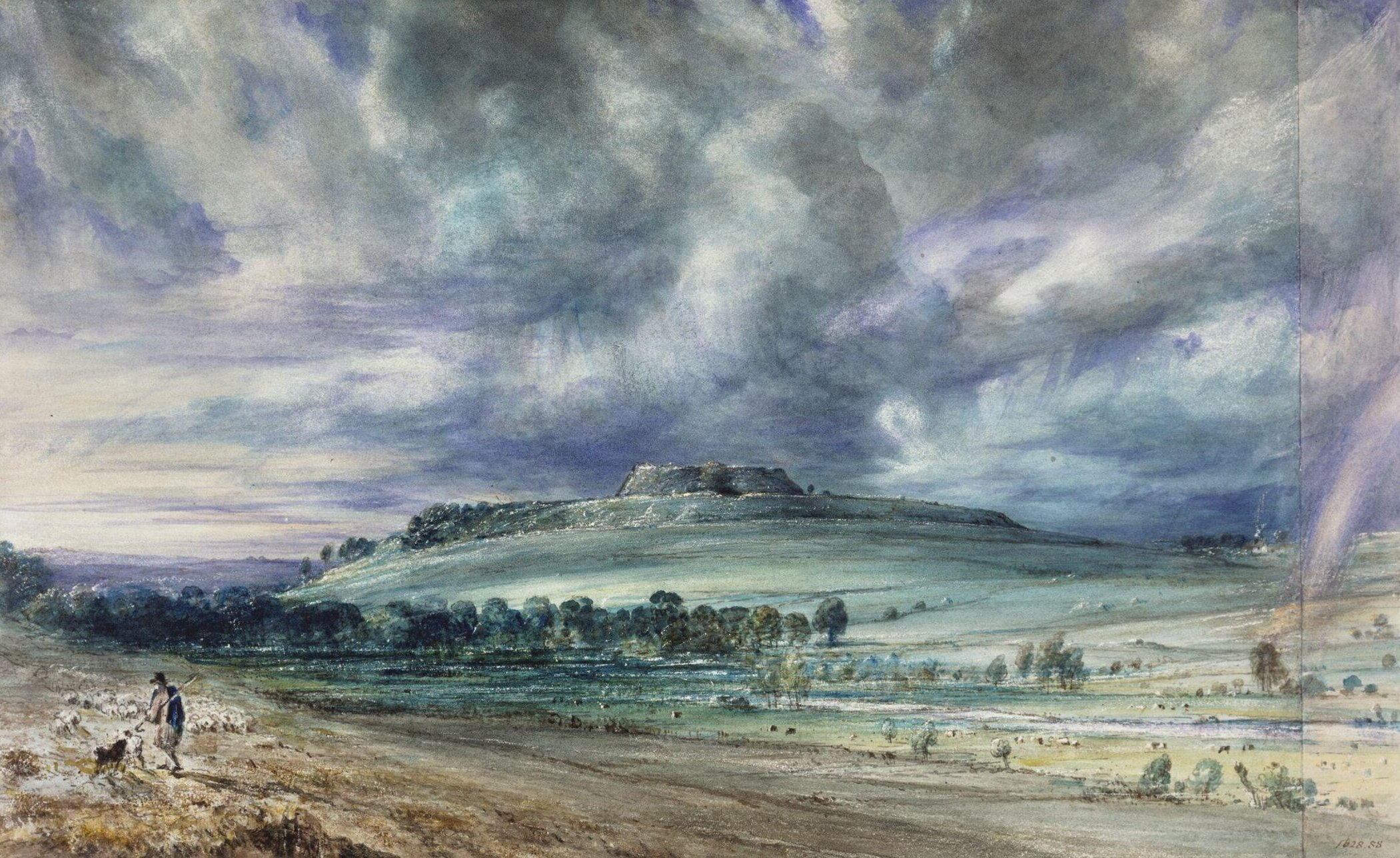
Old Sarum by John Constable

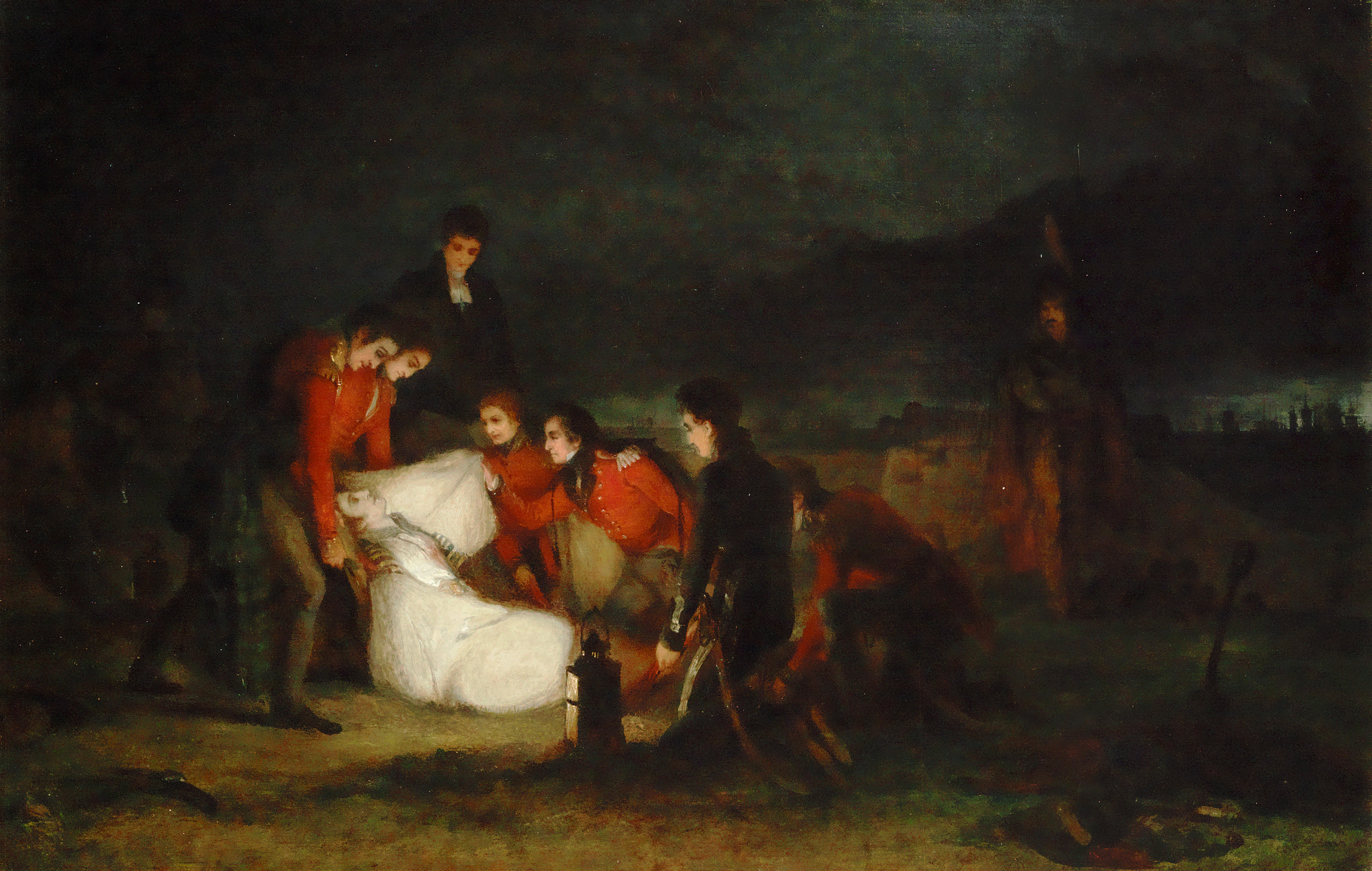
The Burial of Sir John Moore by George Jones

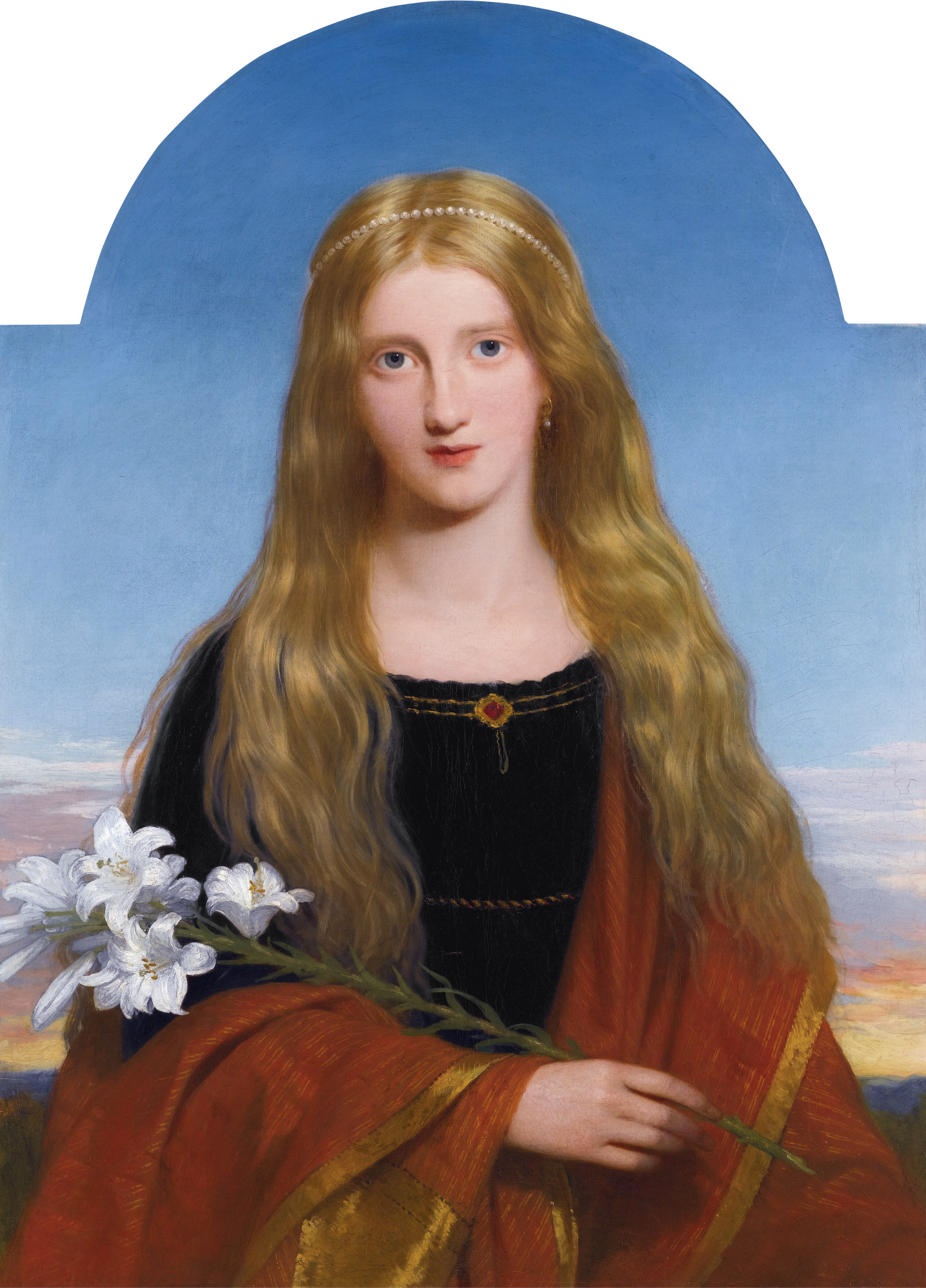
The Lily by Charles Lock Eastlake

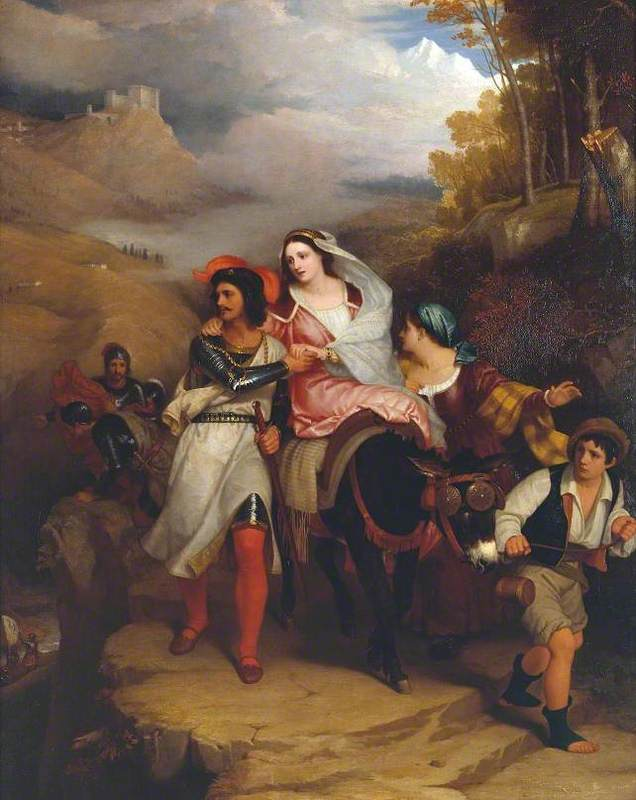
The Escape of Francesco Novello di Carrara by Charles Lock Eastlake

The Melton Hunt Breakfast by Francis Grant

== See also ==
- Salon of 1834, a contemporary French exhibition held at the Louvre in Paris

== Bibliography ==
- Hamilton, James. Turner - A Life. Sceptre, 1998.
- Barber, Tabitha (ed.) Now You See Us: Women Artists in Britain, 1520-1920. Tate Britain, 2024.
- Ormond, Richard. Sir Edwin Landseer. Philadelphia Museum of Art, 1981.
- Tromans, Nicholas. David Wilkie: The People's Painter. Edinburgh University Press, 2007.
- Wellesley, Charles. Wellington Portrayed. Unicorn Press, 2014.
- Wills, Catherine. High Society: The Life and Art of Sir Francis Grant. National Galleries of Scotland, 2003.
