= Captain Swing (disambiguation) =

"Captain Swing" was a name appended to several threatening letters during the rural English Swing Riots of 1830.

Captain Swing may also refer to:

- Swing Riots
- Captain Swing (Barwis play), 1965
- Captain Swing, a 1969 history of the Swing Riots by Eric Hobsbawm and George Rudé
- Captain Swing, a 1979 play by Peter Whelan
- Captain Swing (album), by Michelle Shocked
- Captain Swing, a character in the Discworld novel Night Watch
- Capt'ain Swing, a.k.a. Comandante Mark, an Italian comic book character
