= The Installation of Captain Rock =

Painting by Daniel Maclise

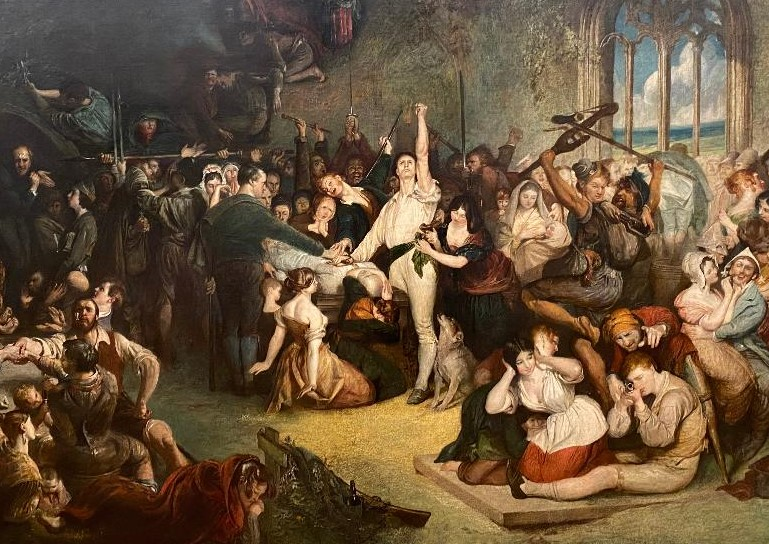
- Artist: Daniel Maclise
- Year: 1834
- Type: Oil on canvas, history painting
- Dimensions: 172 cm × 244 cm (68 in × 96 in)
- Location: Private Collection

The Installation of Captain Rock is an 1834 genre painting by the Irish artist Daniel Maclise. It depicts a ceremony featuring the appointment of the legendary agrarian outlaw leader Captain Rock by his followers. At a time of growing rural unrest across Ireland and Britain, imaginary figures such as Rock and Captain Swing had become popular icons. In 1824 Thomas Moore had published the fictitious Memoirs of Captain Rock.

Maclise was a Cork-born artist who settled in England and produced notable history paintings such as The Death of Nelson. As well as themes from England such as Robin Hood and His Merry Men he also produced works based on Irish history such as The Marriage of Strongbow and Aoife. The painting has a Hogarthian element to it, featuring stock characters of the Irish peasant, but several figures are portrayed with more dignity.

The painting was displayed at the Royal Academy Exhibition of 1834 at Somerset House in London. Maclise retouched it in 1843, allegedly in response to criticism that it was too sympathetic to its subject. Today it is in a private collection.

== Bibliography ==
- Donnelly, James S. Captain Rock:The Irish Agrarian Rebellion of 1821–1824. University of Wisconsin Press, 2009.
- Murray, Peter. Daniel Maclise, 1806-1870: Romancing the Past. University of Michigan, 2008.
- Nolan, Emer. Catholic Emancipations: Irish Fiction from Thomas Moore to James Joyce. Syracuse University Press, 2017.
- Weston, Nancy. Daniel Maclise: Irish Artist in Victorian London. Four Courts Press, 2001.
