= Portrait of Mary Somerville =

1834 painting by Thomas Phillips

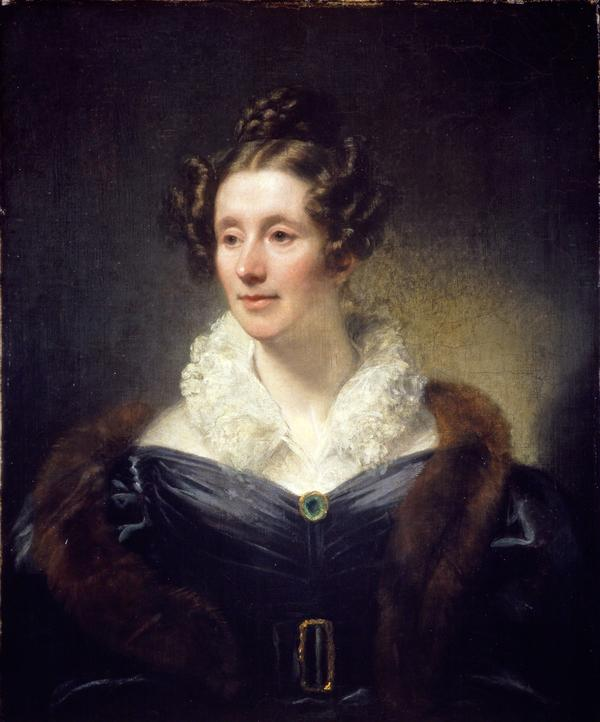
- Artist: Thomas Phillips
- Year: 1834
- Type: Oil on canvas, portrait painting
- Dimensions: 76.2 cm × 63.5 cm (30.0 in × 25.0 in)
- Location: Scottish National Portrait Gallery, Edinburgh

Portrait of Mary Somerville is an 1834 portrait painting by the British artist Thomas Phillips. It depicts the Scottish scientist Mary Somerville. Somerville was a polymath known amongst other things for her interest in astronomy. Somerville College of Oxford University is named after her.

Sommerville was around 54 years old when the portrait was made, however she still looks quite young and elegant for her age. She has a fancy hairstyle of the time and a wears a fine dress, with a fur around her neck.

The painting was displayed at the Royal Academy Exhibition of 1834 at Somerset House in London. Today the work is in the collection of the Scottish National Portrait Gallery in Edinburgh, having been acquired in 1929. .

== Bibliography ==
- Brück, Mary. Women in Early British and Irish Astronomy: Stars and Satellites. Springer, 2009.
