= Bolton Abbey in the Olden Time =

Painting by Edwin Landseer

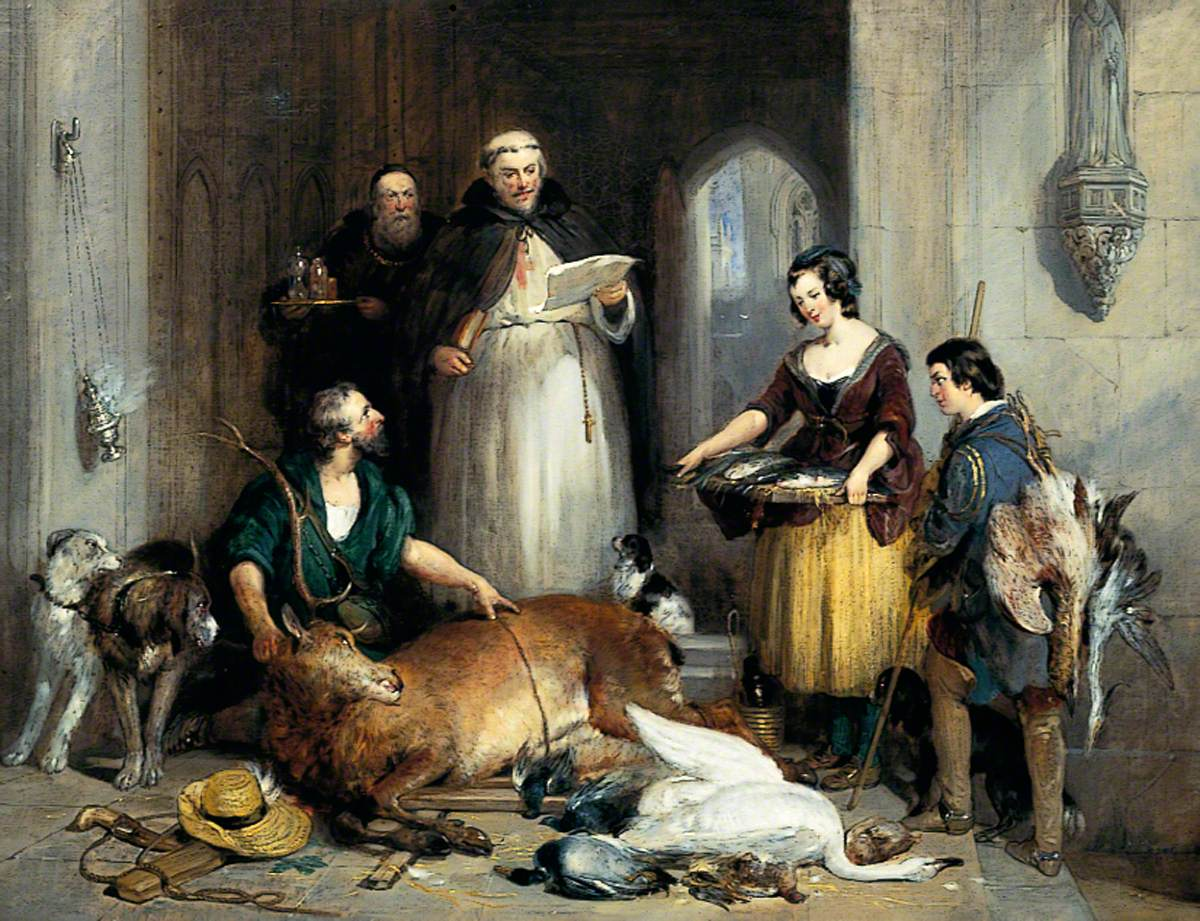
- Copy in the Mercer Art Gallery
- Artist: Edwin Landseer
- Year: 1834
- Type: Oil on canvas, history painting
- Dimensions: 154 cm × 193 cm (61 in × 76 in)
- Location: Chatsworth House, Derbyshire

Bolton Abbey in the Olden Time is an 1834 history painting by the British artist Edwin Landseer. It features a scene set at Bolton Abbey in Yorkshire during its time as Roman Catholic priory. The abbot receives a tribute of food from a forester, falconer and fisherman's daughter.

The painting was commissioned by the Duke of Devonshire the owner of Bolton Abbey. Devonshire had actually requested a depiction of the architecture of the building but Landseer had instead produced a generic view of monastic life in the Medieval era.

The work was displayed at the Royal Academy Exhibition of 1834 a Somerset House in London. Samuel Cousins produced an engraving based on the picture in 1837. The original painting remains in the collection of the Dukes of Devonshire at Chatsworth House. A copy is owned by the Mercer Art Gallery in Harrogate.

== Bibliography ==
- Herrmann, Luke. Nineteenth Century British Painting. Charles de la Mare, 2000.
- Ormond, Richard. Sir Edwin Landseer. Philadelphia Museum of Art, 1981.
