= Captain Swing (Barwis play) =

Captain Swing (1965) is a play for schools, set at the time of the Bristol Riots (1831). The play represents the emotions and the types of people involved in the riots and their climax which occur in any revolution — the realist and the idealist; the pacifist and the militant; the honest and the phoney; and the martyrdom and suffering of the comparatively innocent.

== Synopsis ==
Matthew Dinely, the central tragic figure, is a radical schoolmaster who tries and fails to control the violence of the mob, who are protesting against the failure of yet another attempt at reform of the corrupt political process at a time when a hard-pressed working class, over-worked, ill-housed, and "starving in the midst of plenty", pinned too much hope on the magical banner of Reform. The plot portrays the dilemma of a man who owes allegiance to a cause, but cannot believe that his adversary is evil, or beyond the reach of reasoned argument. The adversary is Lt. Colonel Devoran, a military man who cannot bring himself to use force against people already repressed. In the background is the eponymous but unseen Swing ("he always goes invisible, does Captain Swing"), who leads the mob to rioting.

While the play has both didactic and entertainment roles, it is dramatically well-formed, and balances the relatively gruesome plot against more social, even comic, relief in the form of a gaoler (perhaps funnier than even the authors envisaged); the sinister chorus, whose accusing voices narrate the off-stage action; and the inebriated Mrs Tucker, the gin-shop proprietress. The events described, while dramatised, are historically accurate, and may be compared with first-hand accounts.

=== Authors ===
The author's name is believed to be a composite of the forename of one and the surname of the other of the two joint authors (both teachers at Bristol Grammar School). As they were writing for boys' schools, they created the female parts in such a way as to enable them to be played by boys.

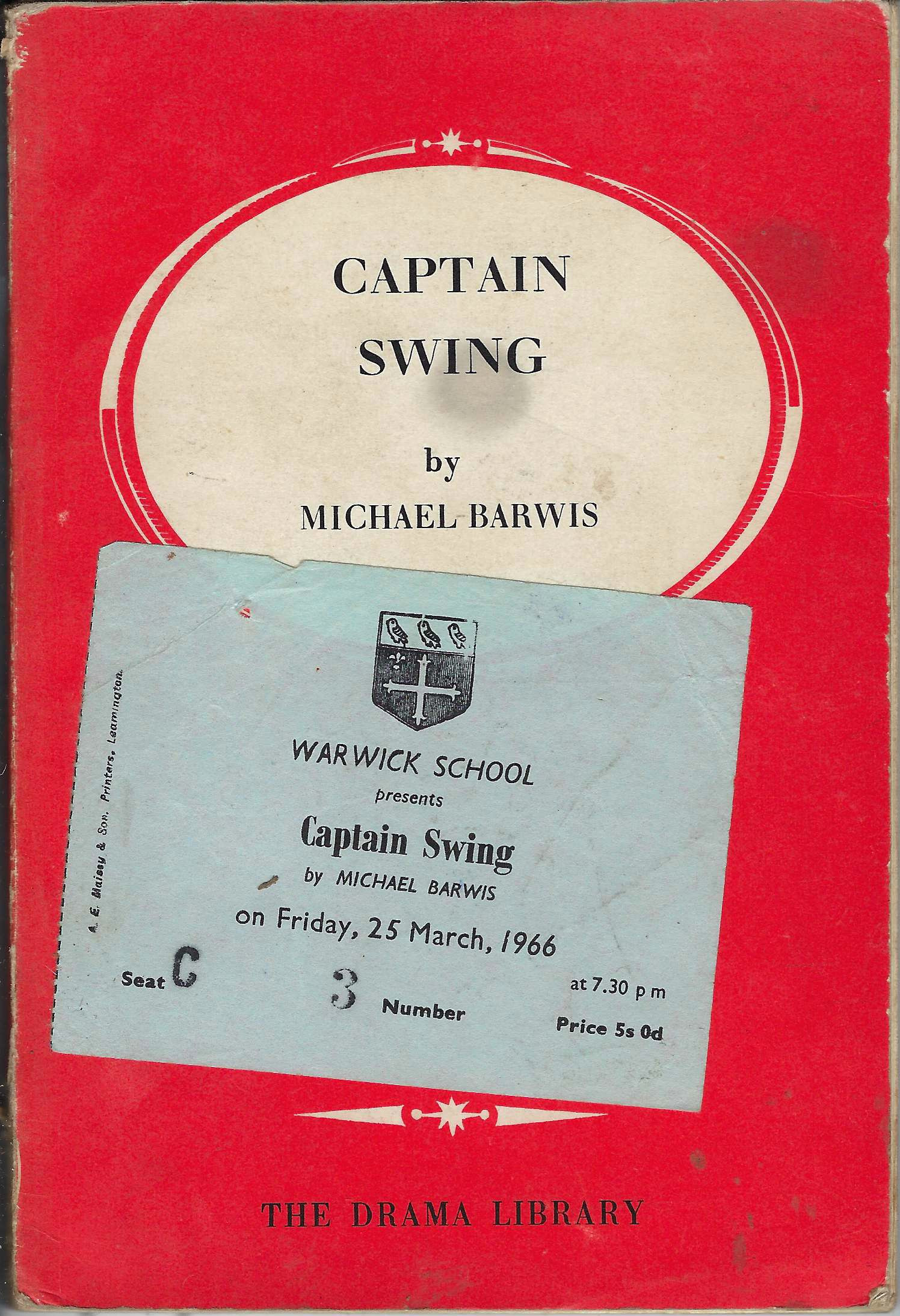
Front cover of a copy of the play "Captain Swing" by Michael Barwis, with ticket for school production
