= Portrait of Sir Thomas Hardy =

Painting by Richard Evans

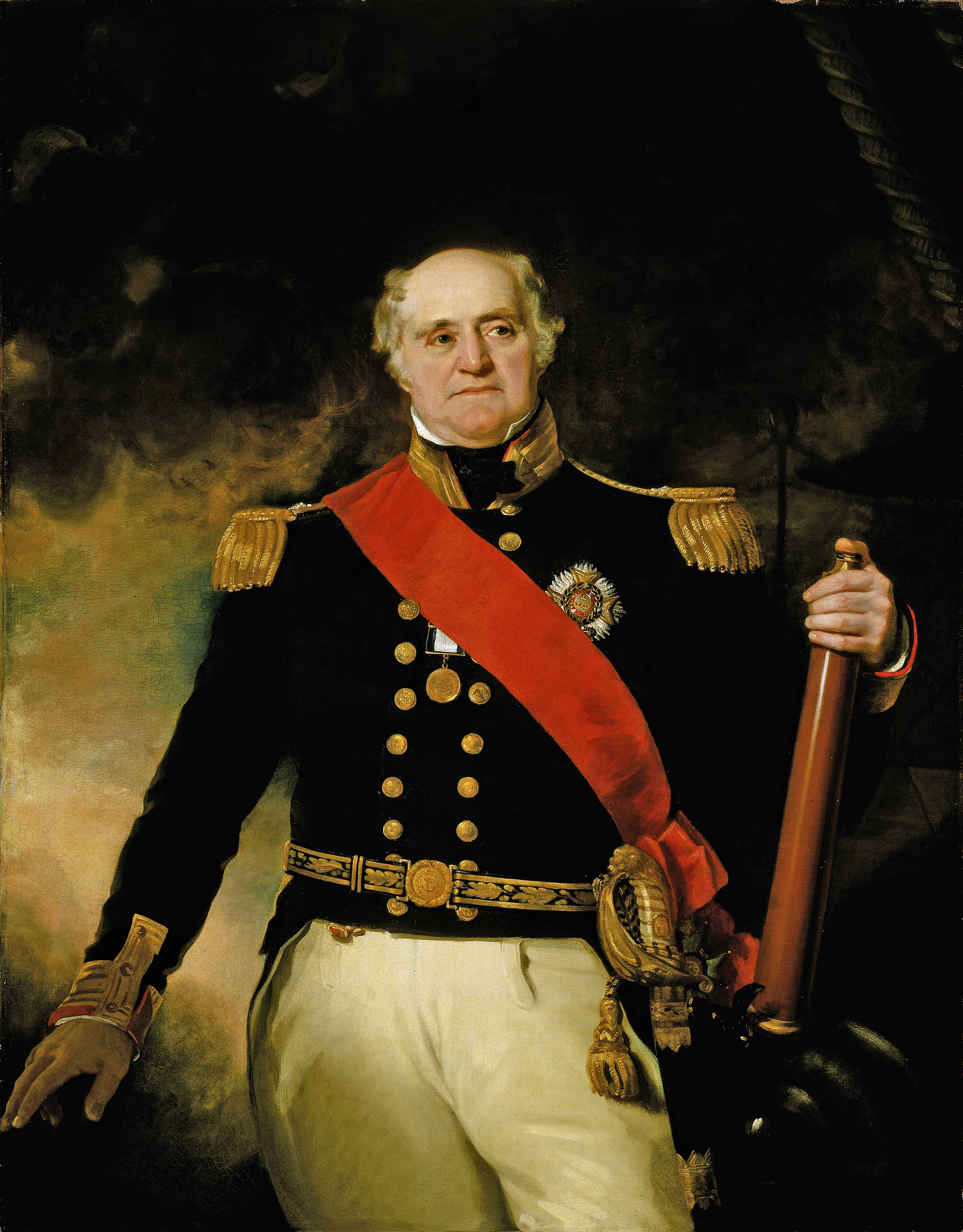
- Artist: Richard Evans
- Year: 1834
- Type: Oil on canvas, portrait painting
- Dimensions: 145.3 cm × 113.7 cm (57.2 in × 44.8 in)
- Location: National Maritime Museum, London

Portrait of Sir Thomas Hardy is an 1834 portrait painting by the British artist Richard Evans. It depicts the British admiral Thomas Hardy. He is shown in the full dress uniform of a Rear Admiral of the Royal Navy with the decorations of the Grand Cross of the Order of the Bath and holding a telescope. It was commissioned to commemorate his appointment as Governor of Greenwich Hospital having previously been First Naval Lord. William IV held him in high regard and only agreed to the appointment on condition that Hardy should return to active duty in the event of a war. Hardy has been the captain of Admiral Nelson's flagship HMS Victory at the Battle of Trafalgar in 1805 and Nelson's dying words "Kiss me, Hardy" has been directed at him.

Evans had spent many years first as the pupil and later the assistant of Thomas Lawrence, the leading portraitist of the Regency era and President of the Royal Academy from 1820 until his death in 1830. This painting was displayed at the Royal Academy Exhibition of 1834 at Somerset House. It was given to Greenwich Hospital in 1840 by the Admiral's widow Lady Hardy. and now forms part of the collection of the National Maritime Museum. A popular mezzotint was produced, based on the Evans painting, by the engraver John Henry Robinson.

== Bibliography ==
- Pearson, Judy & Rodgaard, John. The Trafalgar Chronicle. Pen and Sword, 2024.
- Stewart, William . Admirals of the World: A Biographical Dictionary, 1500 to the Present. McFarland, 2014.
