= Wreckers, Coast of Northumberland =

Painting by J. M. W. Turner

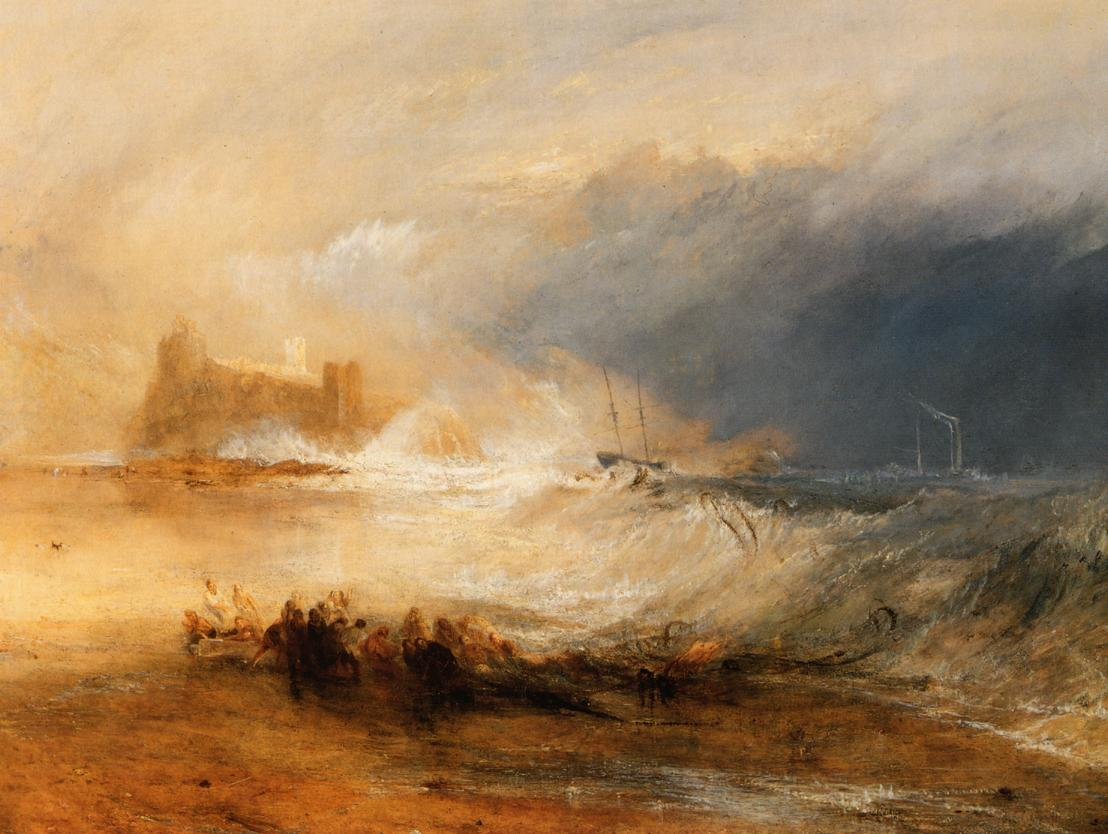
- Artist: J. M. W. Turner
- Year: 1834
- Type: Oil on canvas, landscape painting
- Dimensions: 90.4 cm × 125.7 cm (35.6 in × 49.5 in)
- Location: Yale Center for British Art, Connecticut

Wreckers, Coast of Northumberland is an 1834 landscape painting by the British artist J.M.W. Turner. Stylistically reflecting the romanticism of the era, it depicts a scene on the coast of Northumberland in Northern England. It features a view of a merchant ship about to ground during a storm. A steamship is coming to its aid, but a group of wreckers is shown gathering on the foreground read to pillage the cargo of the vessel, giving the painting its title. The ruins of Dunstanburgh Castle are shown in the distance.

The painting was displayed at the Royal Academy Exhibition of 1834 held at Somerset House in London. In 1844 it was one of eight Turners bought by the whaling magnate Elhanan Bicknell. Today it is in the Yale Center for British Art in Connecticut, having been acquired as part of the Paul Mellon Collection.

== See also ==
- List of paintings by J. M. W. Turner

== Bibliography ==
- Bailey, Anthony. J.M.W. Turner: Standing in the Sun. Tate Enterprises, 2013.
- Hamilton, James. Turner - A Life. Sceptre, 1998.
- Payne, Christiana. Where the Sea Meets the Land: Artists on the Coast in Nineteenth-century Britain. Sanson, 2007.
