= Old Sarum (painting) =

Painting by John Constable

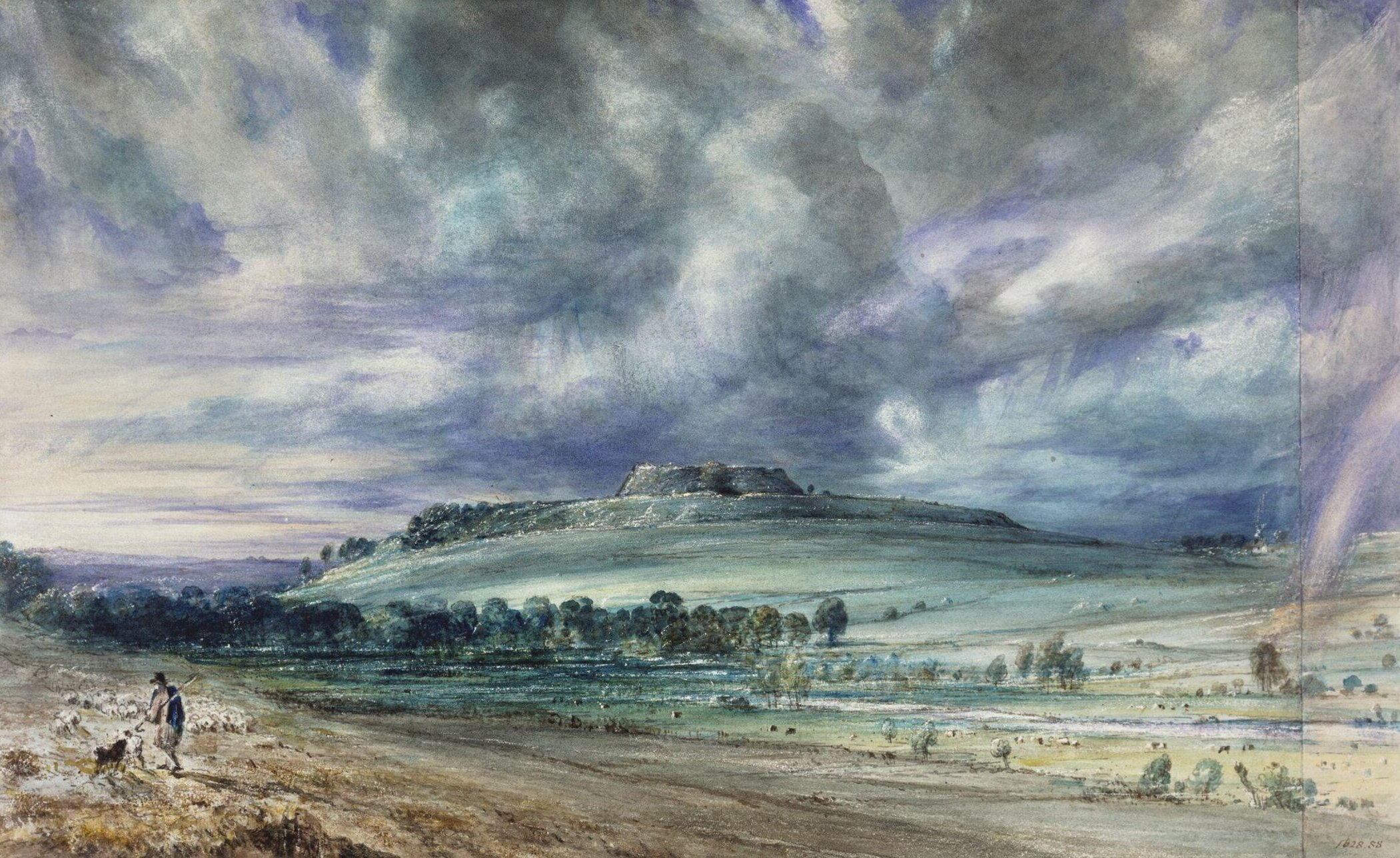
- Artist: John Constable
- Year: 1834
- Type: Watercolour, landscape painting
- Dimensions: 30 cm × 48.7 cm (12 in × 19.2 in)
- Location: Victoria and Albert Museum, London

Old Sarum is an 1834 landscape painting by the British artist John Constable. It features a watercolour depiction of Old Sarum in Wiltshire. Constable frequently painted nearby at Salisbury, particularly around the cathedral.

The painting was produced near to the end of Constable's career. The stormy background reflects the expressive romanticism that featured in Constable's work, particularly his interest in skies which frequently appeared in his oil paintings. Old Sarum has traditionally been a parliamentary constituency, a noted rotten borough which was abolished due to the Great Reform Act of 1832.

The painting was displayed at the Royal Academy Exhibition of 1834 held at Somerset House in London. It is now in the collection of the Victoria and Albert Museum, having been bequeathed by the artist's daughter Isabel in 1888 as part of the Constable Bequest.

In 2025 it was lent to the Tate Britain for the exhibition Turner and Constable: Rivals and Originals.

== See also ==
- List of paintings by John Constable

== Bibliography ==
- Concannon, Amy (ed.) Turner and Constable: Rivals and Originals.Tate Publishing, 2025.
- Morris, Edward. Constable's Clouds: Paintings and Cloud Studies by John Constable. National Galleries of Scotland, 2000.
- Reynolds, Graham .Catalogue of the Constable Collection. Victoria and Albert Museum, 1973.
- Thornes, John E. John Constable's Skies: A Fusion of Art and Science. A&C Black, 1999.
