= St Michael's Mount, Cornwall =

Painting by J. M. W. Turner

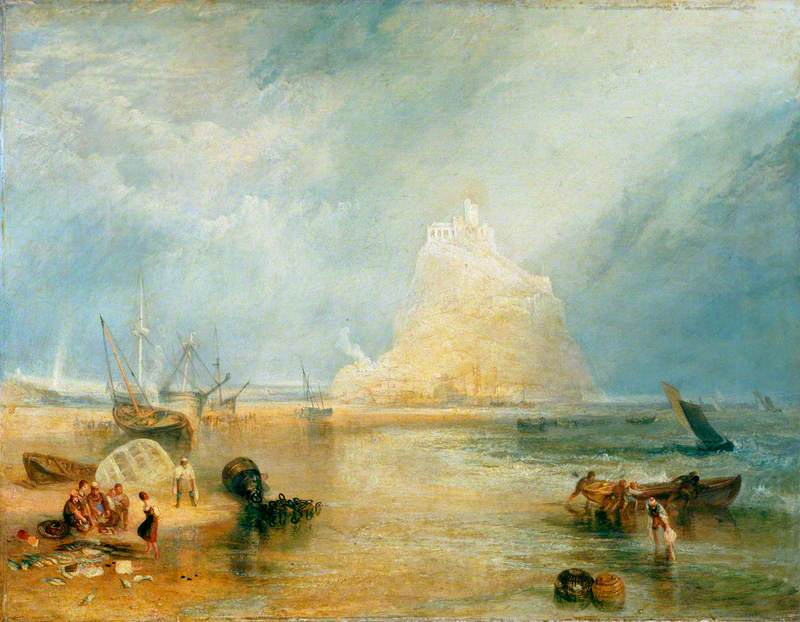
- Artist: J. M. W. Turner
- Year: c.1834
- Medium: Oil on canvas
- Dimensions: 61 cm × 77.4 cm (24 in × 30.5 in)
- Location: Victoria and Albert Museum, London
- Accession: FA.209[O]
- Website: Painting at V&A

St Michael's Mount, Cornwall is an 1834 landscape painting by the British artist J.M.W. Turner. It depicts a view of St Michael's Mount on the southern coast of Cornwall.

It appeared at the Royal Academy's 1834 Summer Exhibition at Somerset House. Part of the collection of John Sheepshanks, it was donated as part of the Sheepshanks Gift to the Victoria and Albert Museum in 1857.

== See also ==
- Mount St Michael, Cornwall, an 1830 painting by Clarkson Stanfield
- List of paintings by J. M. W. Turner

== Bibliography ==
- Roe, Sonia. Oil Paintings in Public Ownership in the Victoria and Albert Museum. Public Catalogue Foundation, 2008.
- Smiles, Sam. J. M. W. Turner: The Making of a Modern Artist. Manchester University Press, 2017.
