= Rachel Campbell-Johnston =

British journalist

Rachel Campbell-Johnston (born October 1963) is The Times newspaper's chief art critic.

Appointed to her post in 2002, she has also been her newspaper's poetry editor, leader writer, deputy comment editor, obituary writer and deputy books editor.

Mysterious Wisdom, her biography of the artist Samuel Palmer, was published in 2011. The Child's Elephant, a novel about an African boy who rears an elephant, set against the backdrop of child soldiers fighting for a rebel army, was published in 2013 and shortlisted for the Carnegie Prize.
