= Captain Swing =

Pseudonym used in the 1830 Swing Riots in England

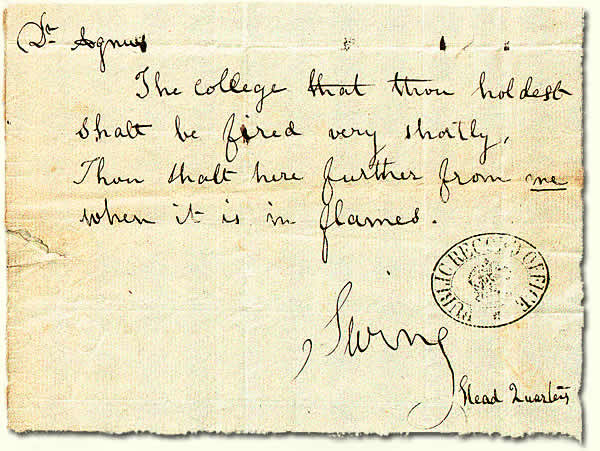
Typical 'Swing' letter

"Captain Swing" was an anonymity pseudonym that was appended to several threatening letters during the rural Swing Riots of 1830, when labourers rioted over the introduction of new threshing machines and the loss of their livelihoods. The name, an invented one, came to symbolise the anger of the poor labourers in rural England who wanted a return to the pre-machine days of human labour.

== Labourers' war ==
William Cobbett was a political activist who supported the working man. He rode around Kent and Sussex and spoke to agricultural workers about their problems. He then used this as source material for his journal the Political Register. He learned that many agricultural labourers were badly paid, or unemployed and half starved. The financial support for a laid-off agricultural worker was less than that paid to support a criminal in prison. Cobbett realised that Parishes were trying to avoid having to provide support to the poor with many parishes sending labouring people to the United States to save the costs of supporting them as paupers. Cobbett had predicted that there would be problems with the agricultural workers and when rural disturbances started in Kent and spread to Sussex during August 1830, Cobbett described it as the "Labourers' war".

The main causes of the disturbances were due to an excess of labour, predominantly by men who had been involved in the Napoleonic wars, returning home. Also by itinerant Irish labourers prepared to work for next to nothing undercutting the local agricultural workers. This coincided with a fall in agricultural prices. During the ensuing depression farmers were not able to pay their agricultural workers a sustainable wage. Farmers also forbade gleaning, the custom of allowing their workers to take leftover crops after the corn harvest, that would help them through the winter. This was compounded by the church tithes and the enclosure of common land.

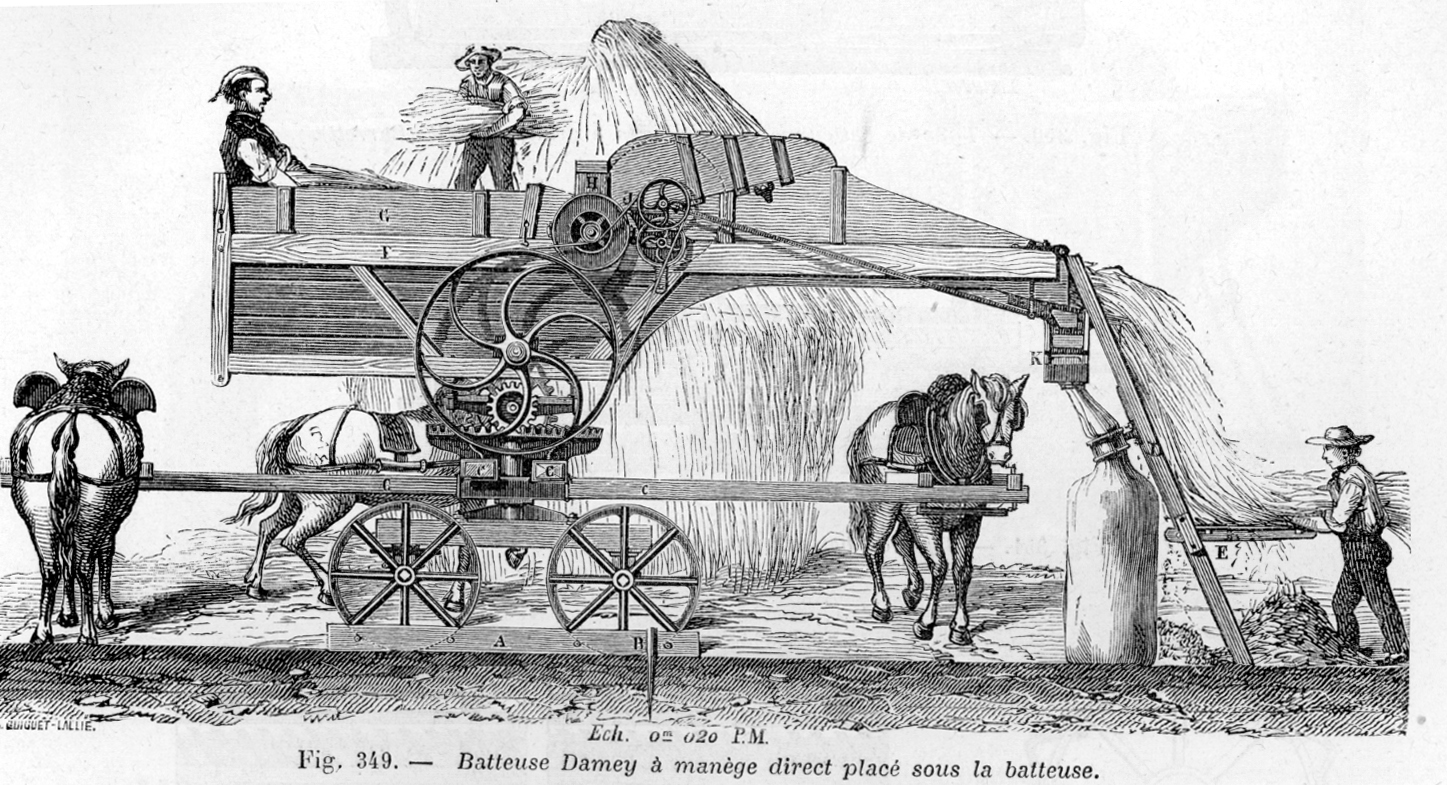
Horse-powered threshing machine

Added to this, farmers began to introduce threshing machines (Note: During the Napoleonic wars, there was a shortage of farm labour, threshing machines were installed to plug the shortfall of labour. Historians have posited that when there was no longer a shortage of labour the cost and unreliability of the threshing machines did not actually make them cost effective.) that displaced workers. The displaced workers had no means to feed or clothe their families during the winter. A resident of Lewes in Sussex, Gideon Mantell the English obstetrician, geologist and palaeontologist noted in his diary of 1830:

It is all bad, our peasantry are in a state of ignorance and slavery: almost starving without the knowledge to attempt obtaining redress without violence, without violating laws, which are made to oppress the poor and protect the rich.

— Quoted in Discovering Sussex, Brandon 2010, pp. 53–54

Popular protests by farm workers occurred across agricultural areas of southern England. The main targets for protesting crowds were landowners/ landlords, whose threshing machines they destroyed or dismantled, and whom they petitioned for a rise in wages.

The protests were notable for their discipline, a tradition of popular protest that went back to the eighteenth century. The act of marching towards an offending farmer's homestead served not only to maintain group discipline, but also to warn the wider community that they were regimented and determined. Often they sought to enlist local parish officials and occasionally magistrates to raise levels of poor relief as well. Throughout England, 2,000 protesters were brought to trial in 1830–1831; 252 were sentenced to death (though only 19 were actually hanged), 644 were imprisoned, and 481 were transported to penal colonies in Australia.

== Background ==
Oh Captain Swing, he'll come in the night
To set all your buildings and crops alight
And smash your machines with all his might
That dastardly Captain Swing!

— Gallop 2017, Part 1

Threshing machines had been contentious since the Napoleonic wars. Letters had been sent to farmers, in the Reading area, suggesting that they should get rid of their threshing machines as early as 1811, the following two were reproduced in The London Gazette:

Whitehall September 3 1811

Whereas it hath been humbly represented to His Royal Highness the Prince Regent that Two anonymous threatening Letters have been received by Mr William Shackell of Early Court and Mr James Fuller of Loddon Bridge near Reading in the County of Berks of which the following are Copies viz.

"Blood and Vengance against Your Life and Your Property for taking away our Labour with Your Threshing Machine Seven of us near your Dwelling House have agreed that if you do not refrain from Your Threshing Machine we will Thresh Your Rick with Fire & Bathe Your Body in Blood How will the People of Reading Gaze to see Early Court all in a Blaze"

You may Believe it so Help Mr Shackell Early Court to be left at Marquis Granby

"A Warning Whereas We are informed You are about to have a Threshing Machine to take away our Labour and If you do there is a plott laid among Us the Labourine People in this neighbourhood to set your Rick and Barns a fire and first opportunity to give you the Leaden fevour."

Mr Fuller
Loddon Bridge Farm Berks

— London Gazette 1811, p. 1730

== Origin and usage of the name ==
The origin of the pseudonym is not clear. The word swing seems to have a deliberate double meaning. It could represent how the part of flail known as either a swing or a swingel, which the thrasher (Note: In modern times thresher is used more commonly than thrasher.) beats the corn out of the ear. It can also represent a swinging corpse on the gallows or gibbet. Possibly a more plausible explanation is that after a work party had stopped to sharpen their scythes and were ready to recommence work the leader would shout out "Swing!", the leader was usually known as the Captain, hence 'Captain Swing'.

On Saturday night, 28 August 1830, in the Elham Valley, Kent a threshing machine was destroyed by rioters. The ringleaders were arrested on the 27 September 1830, nine days after the word 'Swing' was graffitied on unpainted walls between Canterbury and Dover. Also two threatening letters were sent to local farmers, signed SWING:

You are to notice that if you doant put away your thrashing machine against Monday next you shall have a "SWING".

— Griffin 2010, pp. 149–180

The letters threatened violence. The intention was to terrify the farmers. The local paper reported that farmers who received the first two letters were so terrified that they placed their machines in the open field inviting their destruction.

Initially the authorities were not clear who was responsible for the wrecking of threshing machines and other farm equipment, blaming it on poachers, smugglers or deer-stealers. However it was soon realised that it was mainly local village labourers.

The authorities tried to identify who this 'Swing' was and apprehend him: it took a while for them to realise that Captain Swing was probably an invented name. The name became synonymous with the riots and soon symbolized the whole rural resistance.

=== "Swing" letters ===
Sir, Your name is down amongst the Black hearts in the Black Book and this is to advise you and the like of you, who are Parson Justasses, to make your wills. Ye have been the Blackguard Enemies of the People on all occasions, Ye have not yet done as ye ought,... Swing

— Gallop 2017, Part 1

Sir, This is to acquaint you that if your threshing machines are not destroyed by you directly we shall commence our labours. Signed on behalf of the whole... Swing

— Hobsbawm & Rudé 1973, p. 172

Not all letters were from impoverished farm labourers trying to improve their lot; other people saw the use of the eponymous 'Swing' purely for private gain. For example a letter sent to a Mrs Chandler of Church Farm, Pursey, Wiltshire, was an obvious attempt at extortion:

Madam — I have to request that you will send me by return of post the sum of £10, or else your house will be burned with the ground very shortly, as I know that you can well afford to spare that sum for a short time, until I have the effects to repay it. Keep this secret, or it will be the worse for you, as I have spys about your neighbourhood. Direct to me, ‘X.Y.Z.’ The Nag’s Head, James-street, Covent Garden. ‘SWING’. P. S. Be not to make no delay in sending it

— Matthews 2011, p. 31

The sender turned out to be a soldier in the Dragoons.

== Cultural references ==
- Swing is portrayed as an actual person in the alternative reality novel The Difference Engine.
- Captain Swing is a 1989 album by singer-songwriter Michelle Shocked.
- A character named "Findthee Swing" is a captain in the Ankh-Morpork "Unmentionables" secret police in Terry Pratchett's novel Night Watch.
- Captain Swing & The Electrical Pirates Of Cindery Island is a graphic novel by Warren Ellis, featuring a Captain Swing with advanced electrical technology and a flying boat.
- The stage play Captain Swing by Peter Whelan, directed by Bill Alexander, was produced by the Royal Shakespeare Company in 1979.

== See also ==
- General Ludd
- Rebecca Riots
- Captain Rock

== Citations ==
- Brandon, Peter (2010). Discovering Sussex. Andover: Phillimore. ISBN 978-1-86077-616-8.
- Campbell-Johnston, Rachel (2012). Mysterious Wisdom. London: Bloomsbury. ISBN 978 1 4088 2222 7.
- Charlesworth, Andrew, ed. (1983). An Atlas of Rural Protest in Britain, 1548–1900. Philadelphia: University of Pennsylvania Press. ISBN 978-113874-351-9.
- Coveney, Michael (2014) [10 July 2014]. "Peter Whelan obituary". The Guardian. ISSN 0261-3077. Archived from the original on 23 October 2021.
- Douglas, Ian; et al., eds. (2002). Companion Encyclopedia of Geography: The Environment and Humankind. Taylor & Francis. ISBN 978-0-415-27750-1.
- Ellis, Warren; Caceres, Raulo (2011). Captain Swing and the electrical pirates of Cindery Island. London: Avatar Press. ISBN 978-1873-97647-0.
- Gallop, Alan (2017). Six for the Tolpuddle Martyrs: The Epic Struggle for Justice and Freedom. Barnsley: Pen & Sword. ISBN 978-1-52671-250-9.
- Griffin, Carl J. (2010). "The Violent Captain Swing?". Past & Present (209): 149–180. doi:10.1093/pastj/gtq035. JSTOR 40960936.
- Hobsbawm, Eric; Rudé, George (1973). Captain Swing. Harmonsworth: Penguin Books. ISBN 978-01406-0013-1.
- Harrison, L F C (1989). The Common People, a History from the Norman Conquest to the Present. Glasgow: Fontana. ISBN 0-0068-6163-6.
- London Gazette (1811) [11 September 1811]. "London Gazette" (16520 ed.).
- Macdonald, Stuart (1975). "The Progress of the Early Threshing Machine". The Agricultural History Review. 23 (1). British Agricultural History Society: 63–77. JSTOR 40273647.
- Matthews, Mike (2011). Captain Swing in Sussex and Kent: Rural Rebellion in 1830. ChristieBooks. ISBN 978-1-8739-7647-0.
- Pratchett, Terry (2014). Night Watch. Corgi. p. 134. ISBN 978-0552167666.
- Schlebecker, John T (1989). The many names of country people : an historical dictionary from the twelfth century onward. New York: Greenwood Press. ISBN 0-313-26417-1.
- Selke, Lori (2013) [March 22, 2013]. "Michelle Shocked's Short Rise and Long, Confounding Fall". San Francisco Weekly. Archived from the original on April 13, 2018.
- Sussman, Herbert (1994). "Cyberpunk Meets Charles Babbage: 'The Difference Engine' as Alternative Victorian History". Victorian Studies. 38 (1): 1–23. JSTOR 4618879.
