= Economy of Tsarist Russia =

Economic history of Russia prior to 1917

The economy of Tsarist Russia comprises the economic history of Russia from the late Middle Ages until the October Revolution of 1917 (which ushered in a period of civil war, culminating in the creation of the Soviet Union).

Russian national income per capita increased and moved to closer to the most developed economies of Northern and Western Europe from the late 17th century to the mid 18th century. After the mid 18th century, the Russian economy stagnated and declined. In the 18th century, Russian national income per capita was about 40–70% of British per capita income but higher than Poland's. By 1860, Russian GDP per capita was similar to that of Japan; one-third of GDP per capita in the United States or the United Kingdom; and twice that of China or India. Russia was a late industrializer. Over the course of the late 19th century and early 20th century, Russia's railroad system expanded considerably, enabling greater industrialization.

Serfdom, which held back development of the wage labor market and created a shortage of labor for industry, was abolished in 1861. In the aftermath, GDP per capita was volatile and did not substantially increase. Steady economic growth began in the 1890s, alongside a structural transformation of the Russian economy. By the time World War I started, more than half the Russian economy was still devoted to agriculture. By the early 20th century, the Russian economy had fallen further behind the American and British economies. From the late 19th century to the early 20th century, the economy grew at a similar pace as the Japanese economy and faster than the Brazilian, Indian and Chinese economies.

== Historical overview ==
=== Grand Principality and Tsardom economies (15th to 18th centuries) ===
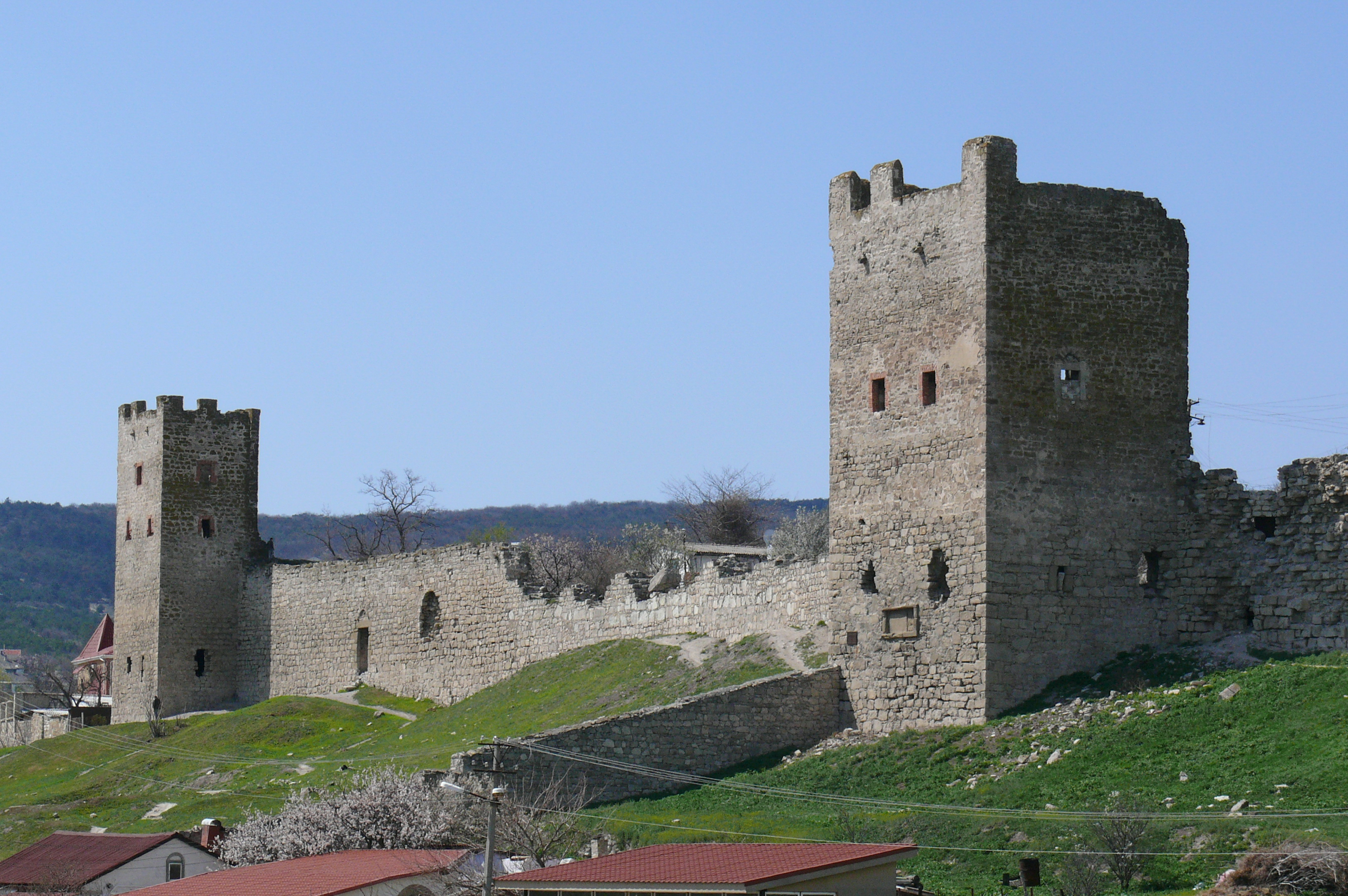
The Genoese city of Kaffa (now known as Feodosia) became a center of Muscovite trade output in the 15th century.

The economy of the Kyivan Rus was one of the strongest in High Medieval Europe at a point, but following the severing of trade ties between the Kyivan Rus and Byzantium, the collapse of the state, and the Mongol Conquest, the economy floundered as cities were despoiled and the East Slavs were forced to pay tribute to their new Tatar overlords. In the 15th century, as the Mongol successor state of the Golden Horde began to collapse following the Timurid invasions, the Muscovites began expanding their trade network, with merchants going to Crimea and trading with the Crimean Goths and the Genoese in Kaffa. Crimea also served as the vantage points for Armenian and Genoese merchants to enter into Russia. Trade along the Volga also increased during this era, with Kazan replacing Bolgar as the principal trading center along the river. Kazan and the neighboring Nogai Horde provided Russia with many traded goods, most notably horses.

Since the days of the Kyivan Rus, Novgorod had served as the central trading city of the Russian people, and their outlet to Western Europe. As the gathering of the Russian lands occurred, the Novgorodian Republic was annexed into Muscovy, and Novgorod's trade importance was as such inherited by the Grand Prince. Muscovy, and later Russia's importance in the Baltic trade increased at the turn of the 16th century, as the Hanseatic League went into decline; Peterhof, the Hanseatic kontor in Novgorod, was closed by Ivan III in 1494. Despite this, Ivan sought to open up external trade as much as possible, setting up numerous trading outposts during his reign, most notably the fortress of Ivangorod on the Narva. This was continued by his successors, including Ivan the Terrible, who established contract with the English via the Muscovy Company, establishing a trade route via the White Sea through Archangel, bypassing the often hostile Swedes and Polish-Lithuanians in the Baltic. Especially following the loss of Ingria in the aftermath of the Livonian War at the end of the 16th century, the Archangel route became the principal conduit of Russo-Western trade. Anglo-Russian relations experienced a downturn in the mid-17th century during the English Civil War, as the Muscovy Company was accused of harboring Parliamentarian sympathies; this culminated in the expulsion of all English merchants from Russia outside of Archangel in 1649, as a reaction to the trial and execution of Charles I; Royalist refugees were also taken in and settled in Moscow during this period. Although tensions thawed following the Royalist Restoration in 1660, the English never managed to recover their position as the dominant western merchantry in Russia, a position that for the remainder of the 17th century was replaced by the Dutch.

The city of Novgorod, seized by Muscovy in 1478, was one of Russia's most important trading cities until its destruction by Ivan the Terrible in 1570.

During the appanage era, the Rus principalities were more often than not oriented around a town, often eponymously. As Muscovy absorbed these lands into its domain, they promptly became centers of Grand Princely and later Imperial administration. Typical Russian towns during the Muscovite and Tsardom eras consisted of artisans who produced a variety of goods, typically for the domestic Russian market. The countryside produced most long-distance trade items, such as fish or salt. The economy during this time largely remained agricultural, with most of the population being subsistence farmers. The pomestye system, whereby land grants given in exchange for military service, was the backbone of Tsarist military capacity, tying the fate of the agricultural economy closely with that of the state. As Russia increasingly centralized in the 16th century, more strain on the peasantry occurred. The reign of Ivan the Terrible unleashed great economic disruption via the Livonian War, Crimeo-Tatar raids, and the rapaciousness of the new oprichniki, who destroyed the great trading city of Novgorod, severely uprooted productive land, and abused the peasantry to the extent that many began fleeing their lands. The extensive disruption helped precipitate the Time of Troubles, in which many peasant leaders and wannabe-Tsars utilized peasant support to amass power.

Following the Time of Troubles, serfdom was formalized as the predominant institution of labor in Russian society. The broad social and economic upheaval inflicted upon Russia from the Time of Troubles prompted this as the Russian nobility needed to be kept solvent, and permanently tying the peasantry to their lords was seen as the way to accomplish this. The Sobornoye Ulozheniye of 1649, a revised legal code implemented by Tsar Alexis, effectively codified the institution of serfdom in Russia; serfdom in Russia closely resembled that of chattel slavery, especially as the 17th century marched onwards and the rights of the serfs further eroded.

Russia's main exports before the Petrine reforms was fur, as the age of fur intensified during the mini-ice age. Control of the fur trade informed the Muscovite conquest of Novgorod in 1478, as well as the expansion into Siberia starting in the 1580s and its related colonial efforts in the New World. Salt was also important; the House of Stroganov, which spearheaded the initial colonization of Siberia, initially built themselves off the salt trade. Domestic manufacturing was essentially absent and there was strong state interference in the economy, with monopolies being held by the Tsars over certain luxury goods.

=== The Petrine and Cathrinian economies (18th centuries to 1861) ===
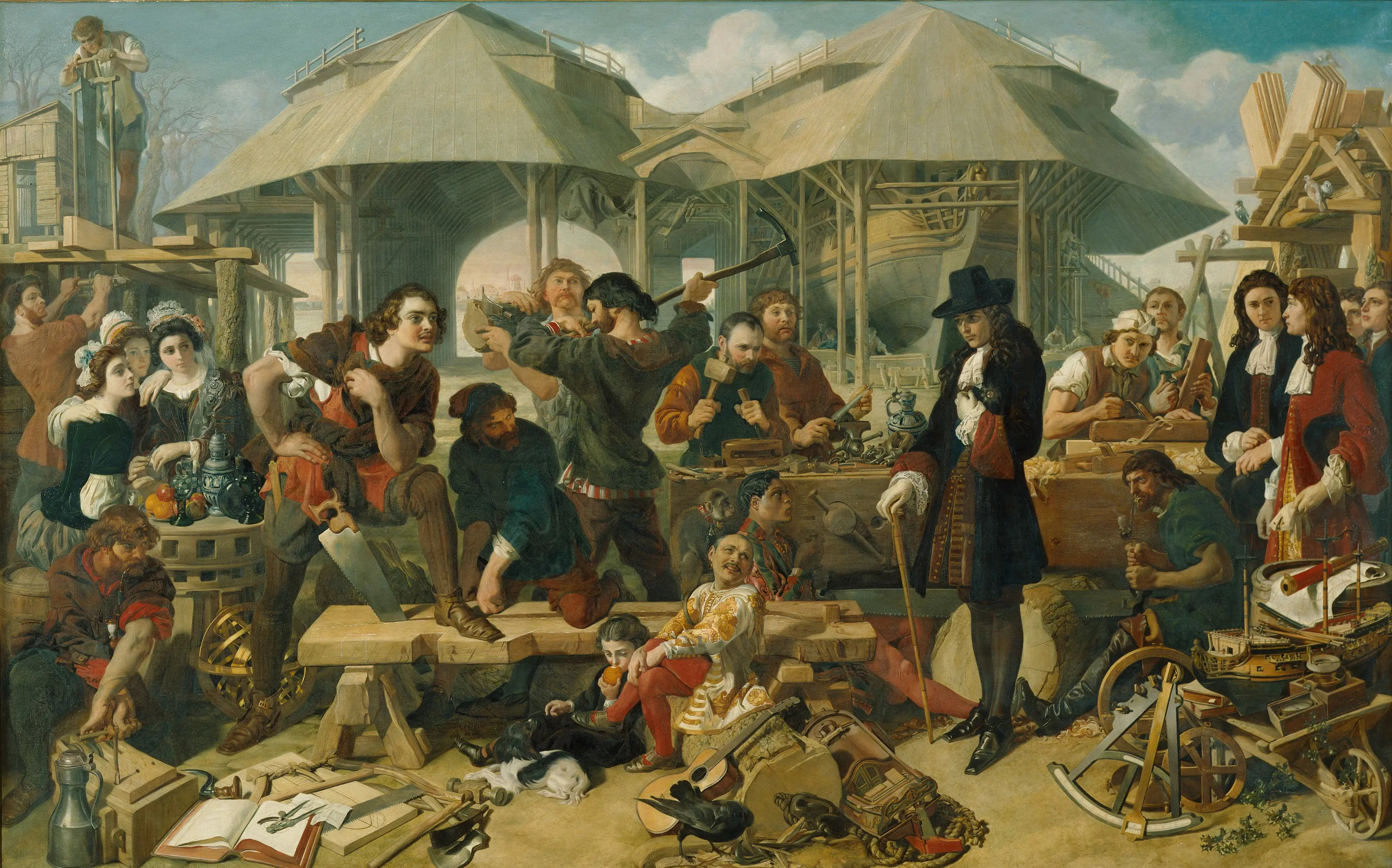
Peter the Great at Deptford Dockyard, by Daniel Maclise (1857). Peter's observations of Western manufacturing were imported to Russia in order to boost its economic output.

Under Peter the Great, Russia's first major manufacturing enterprises were founded, largely pertaining to metallurgy and textiles, often in service of his wars. The Urals began to be developed as a center of iron production during his reign via state-sponsored foundries making armaments. He also encouraged the development of merchant companies and improving domestic infrastructure, such as the Vyshny Volochyok Waterway, a canal system linking the Baltic and Volga. After Ingria was recaptured from Sweden during the Great Northern War, Peter ordered the construction of the city of Saint Petersburg on the mouth of the Neva, finally replacing the long in-decline Novgorod as the country's principal Baltic trading outlet and Archangel as its main trading outlet. The new Baltic port city swiftly became Russia's principal commercial hub. The Russian economy evolved under Peter to have a surface-level modernizing, exporting economy over a layer of a serf-based agricultural economy. The next great Russian monarch, Catherine the Great, would see the acquisition of the Black Sea littoral and Crimea via the takeover of the Crimean Khanate. The expansion of Russia into these rich lands of the Pontic Steppe, known by the Polish-Lithuanians as the Wild Fields would provide access to some of the most fertile lands on Earth, prompting an influx of settlers to populate what was now called New Russia; these new agricultural resources, as well as other exports, were now also more easily able to be shipped with access to the Black Sea, which by proxy granted access to the Mediterranean. As a result of the Petrine and Catherinian developments, Russia's foreign trade expanded significantly throughout the 18th century, with grain becoming increasingly important. Great Britain was the country's most important trading partner during this era.

During the age of the Grand Princes, the taxation system constituted of levies on land ownership and personal property, industrial and commercial production, service obligations, and judicial fees. Landowners were required to pay a tribute, or dan, a "recension squirrel" (pischaya belka), and sometimes an additional "supplement" (primet). Marriage was also taxed and commerce as well via tolls introduced during the Kyivan and Mongol eras. Commoners were obliged to assist in the transit of goods as well as fund the yam, or the Mongol-era postal service that was preserved following independence. As the peasantry became less free with the arrival of serfdom, taxation became more onerous throughout the Tsardom era. The Petrine reforms and wars were often funded via aggressive taxes, most famously the beard tax, which forced the Russian nobility to shave their facial hair in an attempt to fit into contemporary western fashion trends. More significantly, the soul tax in 1722 implemented a per-capita tax on all male serfs and state peasants; payments that were the responsibility of their landlords, which further entrenched serfdom. The soul tax remained the principal source of Tsarist revenue for over a century. Under Peter III in 1762, the Russian nobility were granted tax-exempt status, which was reinforced by his wife, overthrower, and successor, Catharine the Great, who was under the influence of French Physiocratism. Catherine further granted the nobility preferential treatment in 1785, when she granted them full ownership of the serfs and their lands, further entrenching the Nobility's dominance, but also locking the Empire into a serfdom-oriented model right as the Industrial Revolution was kicking off.

=== Industrialization (1861 to 1917) ===
Reading of the Emancipation Manifesto to serfs. Painting by Boris Kustodiev, 1907.

As the 19th century trudged along, it became apparent that reform was needed. Serf labor was inefficient, immobile, and effectively rendered productivity growth non-existent. The Russian nobility was becoming increasingly indebted, with the majority of Russians serfs being mortgaged to state credit institutions by their lords by 1861. Russia itself was in great debt following the French Revolutionary and Napoleonic Wars. Following the shocking Russian military performance in the Crimean War in the 1850s, reform became seen as inevitable by the new Tsar, Alexander II, who, with the nobility having lost their political leverage via their debt to the state, was able to emancipate the Russian serfs in 1861. With the Tsar's consent, 23 million people were freed from the institution of serfdom, but to compensate the embittered nobility, the new freedmen had to pay redemption payments to their former lords for the next 49 years in exchange for the new land that they received, which were typically less and of lower quality than what they had farmed while in bondage. Nevertheless, emancipation did release a substantial labor force that settled into cities, helping finally promulgate the Russian Industrial Revolution. The final decades of the 19th century saw rapid infrastructure developments, most notably railroad construction, with the Trans-Siberian Railway being built during this era. The expansion of the Russian railroad network, often funded by foreign capital (primarily of Belgio-French origin) helped facilitate greater internal and external exporting capabilities.

Much of this economic development was undertaken by Sergei Witte, Russia's Finance Minister who dominated economic policy in the 1890s. Witte utilized high protective tariffs to shield Russian manufacturing, secure foreign loans, subsidize core industries, and implement a gold standard in 1897. Russia's industrial output grew by an average of 8% throughout the 1890s, becoming the fastest in the world. Production of steel, coal, and textiles all swelled, while the Baku oilfields made the Empire briefly the largest oil producer around the turn of the century.

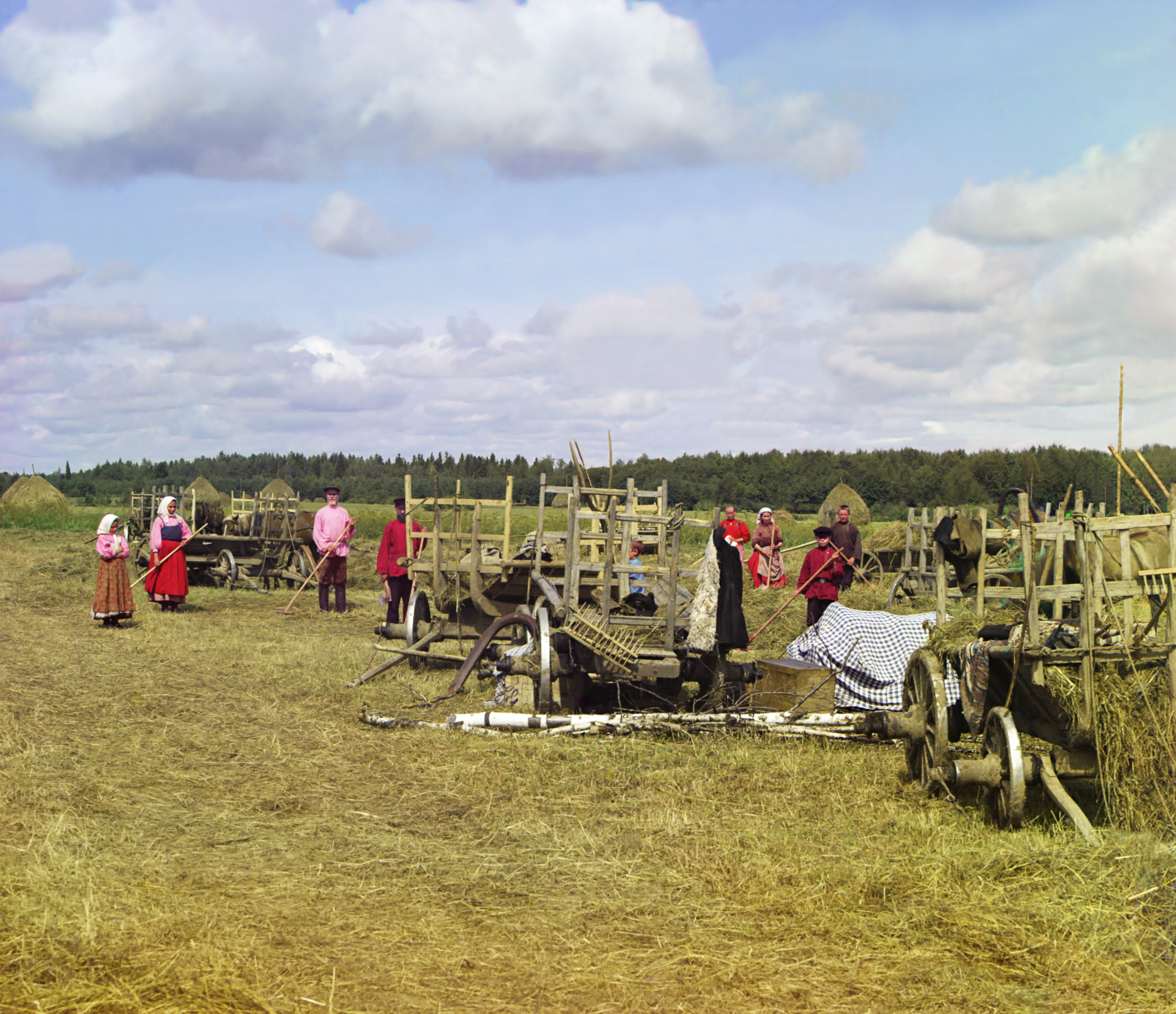
Haymaking farmworkers taking a break in 1909. Photo by Sergey Prokudin-Gorsky.

In spite of this, Russia remained predominantly agrarian by the turn of the century, with the peasantry still consisting of 80% of the population at the turn of the 20th century, and living standards remaining low; in some areas, the lack of adequate land to support the peasantry had actually caused the quality of life to decline. Famines remained common, with a particularly severe one from 1891 to 1892 killing close to half a million people. Continued industrialization was interrupted by the Russo-Japanese War and First Russian Revolution. In 1906, Pyotr Stolypin came to power as Prime Minister, under the Tsar Nicholas II. Stolypin implemented a variety of major economic reforms that helped modernize the Russian economy. In particular, he attempted to dissolve the mirs, or peasant communes that held collective decision and land authority in their respective villages, replacing it with individual peasant proprietorship so that a class of independent peasants could develop and be more productive; this process was halted after his assassination.

Despite these reforms in the decades since emancipation, the Russian Empire performed poorly in World War I, with the conflict demonstrating all the weaknesses and woes of the Russian economy. The mobilization of Russia pulled tens of millions out of agriculture, precipitating a massive collapse in food output. The strained railway system proved unable to support both the front and the cities. Inflation skyrocketed, while food and fuel shortages became increasingly omnipresent, and public discontent culminated in the Russian Revolution in 1917, as the public blamed Nicholas II for the economic, social, and battlefield woes the country was experiencing, forcing him to abdicate.

== Abolition of serfdom ==
In February 1861, Emperor Alexander II signed the Emancipation reform of 1861 and the Manifesto. Both documents were distributed in 45 provinces. The development of small business was restrained by the existence of serfdom. Thus, new opportunities for entrepreneurs were opened only after the abolition of serfdom in 1861. The power of the landowners over the peasants was abolished, and the peasants received personal freedom. The former serf became a legal entity that had the right to own property, engage in trade and crafts, marry without the consent of the landowner, initiate legal claims and participate in elections to local governments. The peasants received the estate and the allotment for permanent use, which they could not get rid of earlier than 9 years later. Land left to the peasants remained the legal property of the landowner until the conclusion of the redemption transaction. Prior to its conclusion, the peasants were considered temporarily liable and differed from the serfdom in the more precise fixing of peasant duties by law. The size of the allotment and the volume of duties were fixed by the charter, for the preparation of which was given 2 years. That is why the implementation of the reform began in 1863.

Later, the originally proposed norms were significantly reduced. If the pre-reform allotment was less than the established one, then cutting was provided at the lower rate, and if more, then the surplus was cut off in favor of the landowner. These lands are called segments. Especially, a lot of land was cut off from peasants in the Central Black Earth Region. On average, peasants received 3.3 tithes per male soul, which did not provide them with a living wage. Women were not given land. Another of the injustices of the new land system was that the landowner left most of the grazing land and forests that serfs formerly use freely. Now they had to be rented for a fee, which constantly created the basis for clashes between peasants and landowners.

Peasants bought the estate and allotment. The repurchase amount in the Non-Chernozem zone included capitalization of the quitrent. The cost of land purchased by peasants included the price of serf souls. In other words, the bank must be paid such an amount that the annual 6% of it makes an income equal to the rent. Redemption payments included not only the market value of the land received, but also in hidden form the value of the identity of the peasant. The role of the intermediary banker in carrying out the redemption operation was assumed by the government.

The peasants paid the landowner 20% of the redemption amount. The remaining 80% of the cost of land was paid for by the state. The state provided the peasant with a redemption loan, thus giving him money on credit. The peasants had to pay off installment debt for 49 years in the form of "redemption payments" at the rate of 6% per annum of the redemption amount. In general, the peasants bought not only land, but also the value of serf labor, which enabled the state to cash in on the redemption operation.

Unlike Austria and Prussia, the Russian government did not invest a single ruble in agrarian reform, but managed to make the redemption operation beneficial to the state. The debts of the landowners were transferred to the shoulders of the peasants. They financed the development of the noble economy, helping it grow into capitalism and switch to bourgeois rails. The more the landowner economy was capitalized, the less the peasant had the opportunity to become a farmer. Russian agrarian capitalism was competitive in the world market, remaining backward. Feudal remnants were present, as this guaranteed cheapness and ease of management.

Everything changed with the appointment of Stolypin as Minister of Internal Affairs, Nikolai 2 back in 1903 proposed to carry out agrarian reform, but the zemstvo rejected his proposals. Stolypin decided to continue this idea. In 1906, a massive purchase of landed estates by the peasant bank began, all these lands were sold cheaply to peasants, which bore fruit and by 1916 more than 90% of all cultivated land belonged to peasants. However, this had the other side of the coin, peasant farms provided less food than landlords and this almost caused famine, the imperial government was able to avoid a new catastrophe with huge costs.

Nevertheless, peasant welfare grew, the most extreme estimates of peasant income growth for 1900-1913 show that there was an increase of one and a half times (from 22 rubles to 33), however, these estimates are not accurate and do not reflect some secondary incomes of peasants, as well as their secret savings. All this was provided that the peasant was not in a state of increased labor tension most of the time.

== Growth of capitalism ==
The problem of the serf economy was that in agriculture and industry there were neither conditions for introducing free labor, nor free workers themselves, because the country produced a limited volume of production, and society constantly needed to increase labor in agriculture (in labor serfs).

The development of capitalist relations in agriculture was difficult. Since the extremely extensive system of economy was also severely limited by the conditions of nature and climate. It required large financial investments that are necessary for the development of market relations in connection with the collapse of former ties with the peasant economy.

The transition from subsistence economy to monetary revealed the complete inability of the nobility of the Central Chernozem Earth region to adapt to new economic conditions. Consequently, impoverishment of the nobility and even the ruin of its certain layers. A significant part of the landowners could not or did not want to move away from the old and familiar forms of farming. Middle-estate and small-estate nobles were forced to lay their clan nests. The nobles asked to give them a certificate that they did not have any real or movable capital, on the basis of which they asked to accept their children for official maintenance or to write off arrears from them. This noble "prostration", the lack of economic culture, a sufficient amount of necessary equipment and skilled workers led to the "ceased to be nobles" of private ownership of land ownership. The nobles have not yet adapted to the new conditions of the economy; therefore, the desolation of their estates, the ruin of their nests, debts and poverty were only the logical consequences of this inadequacy.

There were noble estates, where the economy, after the reform, was quite "kept afloat". So, on the lands of E.P. Demidova in the estate of the Rastunovo-Shebantsevsky volost, the economy was carried out in the same size. With the amount of land in the estate of 400 acres, the owner managed to keep the same as it was before 1861, from the moment it was acquired in 1848, and in any case until 1877, which is indicated in the source. The only difference was that until 1861 the land was cultivated by corvée peasants, and after the reform by free labor. The economy continued to be maintained in the same mode as before, i.e. 20 farm acres per field and with a three-field system, however, with the active use of fertilizers. The estate had 31 horses and 22 cows until 1861, and after them several horses were added. The amount of plowing remained the same as the size of the sowing, but since serf labor was replaced by hired labor, with fewer working hands and the same space of the cultivated land, more arable land was obtained number of products.

The main source of the formation of an army of wage workers was the liberation of the multimillion masses of the peasantry from serfdom. A smaller part of it (approximately 4 million landless and low-land peasants) was immediately thrown into the free labor market, while the majority came there gradually, as the peasantry became stratified and ruined. By the beginning of the 1880s, the working class in Russia had already formed. Its number then reached 7.35 million people. For 1861–1900, according to A.G. Rashin, it grew numerically from 3.2 to 14 million people (industrial workers – from 720 thousand to 2.8 million), i.e. 4.4 times, while the entire population of the country increased from 70 to 132.9 million people (about 90%).

As for the accumulation of capital, post-reform Russia could use very advantageous, specifically inherent sources. The first of these was the redemption of peasant lands, during which the landlords received 2 billion rubles over 30 years. (of which 750 million – in the first 10 years). The second source was the inflow of foreign capital (since the 60s mainly in railway construction, and since the 70s – in industry). From 1861 to 1881, over 19 thousand kilometers of railways were built. Southern factories began to manufacture rails and equipment for railroads, which had previously been imported from abroad. In the south of Russia, a new industrial area has grown – the Donetsk coal basin (Donbas). In the Caucasus, the Baku oil region developed rapidly, in which valuable liquid fuel was extracted – oil. Foreign capitalists, of course, contributed to the industrial development of Russia, but at first they took over individual enterprises and, eventually, entire branches of production. Tissue production has tripled. Weaving mills supplanted handicraft weaving. Capitalism penetrated into the countryside. Landowners gradually turned into capitalist ones. A wealthy elite — the kulaks — quickly grew up among the peasants. Englishman John Hughes in 1869–1872 built in with. Yuzovka (now Donetsk, Ukraine) The Yuzov Metallurgical Plant, which soon overgrown with its own iron mines and coal mines.

In all sectors, there was a desire to improve the quality of products and to introduce improved production methods that contributed to cheaper production, making goods more accessible to the mass of consumers. The government laid the development of technical educational institutions and the direction of their activities to meet the needs of industry. In connection with the successes of industry, domestic trade was developing, which, according to approximate estimates, amounted to at least 4 billion rubles in goods turnover. The total turnover of foreign trade in imports and exports in total in 1857 reached approximately 300 million rubles and remained at that level until 1864. By 1878, the turnover reached 1,213.6 million rubles, including over 595 million – import and 618 million – export. In 1855, the number of joint-stock companies and companies with a capital of 41.4 million rubles did not exceed 50. By 1880, 506 commercial, industrial, banking insurance, shipping and railway joint-stock companies and companies with a capital of 862.5 million credit and 1 271 300 000 rubles.

Cities not only grew, but also improved. Their layout improved, new buildings appeared, straightened, planted green, paved and paved streets. The water supply system, which until 1861 existed only in Moscow, Saratov, Vilna, Stavropol and Torzhok, began to be built in all major cities. From 1879, electric light appeared on the streets of Russian cities, and from 1882, a telephone appeared in city apartments.

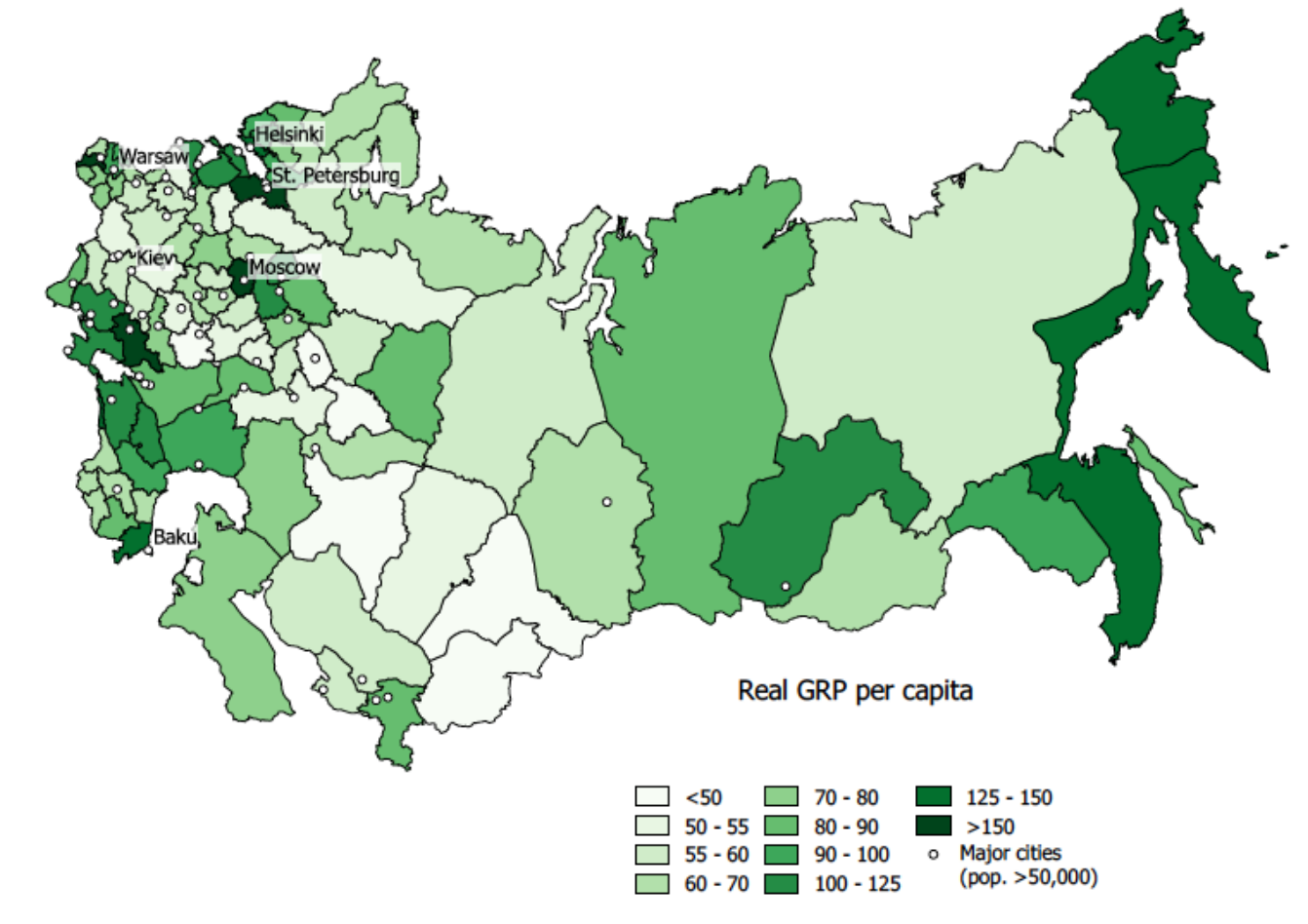
Real gross regional product per capita by Russian region in 1897.

Having joined the world cycle of capitalist production, Russia, together with other countries, experienced economic crises of 1873–1877, a prolonged depression of the second half of the 80s, and a steep industrial upsurge in the 90s. Industrial production in Russia over the last decade of the century has doubled, while in Germany – by 62%, in the United States – by 38%, in England – by 27%. However, the starting positions of the powers before such a jerk were enormously different. After the introduction of labor legislation in 1897, the Russian proletariat was on fairly good living conditions, although it was poorer than the proletariat of the Western powers, nevertheless, the overall labor intensity was less, Russia was one of the few countries with labor legislation. The working hours of the proletarians tended to decrease, maintaining the rate of productivity growth per employee (1.6% per year) It was one of the highest rates in the world. In 1913, the length of the working day in Russia was less than 10 hours. Salaries have increased one and a half times since 1894-1913.

== Noble households in the Voronezh province ==
The abolition of serfdom radically changed the conditions of the economic activity of the nobility. The landowners, in spite of the replacement of the quitrent by corvée, became impoverished one after another; estates were pledged to state and private credit institutions; the capital received from there in most cases did not receive a productive occupation; Noble estates burdened with state and private debts did not increase productive turnover in the landlord economy.

By 1861, the Voronezh province was a typically agricultural region, the vast majority of the province's population was engaged in tillage and animal husbandry. The focus of the activities of the noble households was agrarian, based on the ownership of serfs. The peasants carried "obrok" and "barshina" service with a predominance of "barshina" service. On the eve of the abolition of serfdom in landlords, an extremely rare phenomenon was the use of agricultural machinery and civilian labor (in view of the absence of a pronounced need).

The use of machines was only in large estates of such representatives of the estate as earl A. Kushelev-Bezborodko, Prince I. Vasilchikova. Threshing, reaping and mowing machines were ordered to advanced noble farms. The problem of the non-proliferation of agricultural machinery was caused by the feudal system itself, which made it possible not to care about the quality of production due to the large number of peasant hands. A characteristic feature of the private land tenure of the province, as well as throughout the country, was the predominance of large holdings of over 500 acres. The share of such possessions in the province accounted for more than 70% of privately owned lands.

A significant part of the nobility saw the easiest and most convenient way to earn income on a land lease, providing land primarily to peasants who needed it. Lease relations in the Voronezh province were one of the most developed in the Central Black Earth Region and throughout the European part of Russia. Large estates were characterized by long-term leases (more than 3 years). Landowners leased large areas – up to 10 thousand acres. By 1881, arable land in Voronezh province occupied 69.1% of the land taken for rent, 30.9% – meadows and pastures. Ownership of up to 50 acres was handed over by 3.5% of owners, from 50 to 500 dessiatins. – 19%, over 500 dess. – 26.4%, that is, 48.5% of the noble households leased their land [10]. In the 1860s and 1870s the cost of renting one tithing of land in the province when removing from 2 to 10 thousand tithing ranged from 2 to 4 rubles for tithing, small land plots were leased for the amount of 6 to 10 rubles for tithing3. According to A. M. Anfimov, the cost of renting one tithe of land in the Voronezh province in 1887–1888. averaged 8.80 rubles., in 1901 – 10.5 rubles., in 1912–1914. – 19.44 rubles [2]

== Monetary credit system of Russia ==
In 1860, to revive trade turnover and strengthen the monetary credit system of Russia, the State Bank of the Russian Empire was created, which was assigned the role of the main credit institution and the state-controlled source of covering the budget deficit. With the creation of the State Bank, the government was able to borrow the money he needed as necessary without any difficulties.

According to the law of 19 February 1861, the execution of the redemption operation was entrusted to local treasuries (cash duties: reception, storage and vacation of sums), provincial affairs for the presence of the peasants (consideration and approval of redemption transactions, issuance of tickets and certificates for redemption transactions, account management on redemption loans) and state chambers (audit of financial statements on redemption operations of treasuries and provincial presences). Then it was assigned to the Department of the State Treasury and the Department of Salaries and the St. Petersburg State Treasury. The lack of a central institution at the beginning of the redemption operation created such confusion in reporting that the Government was not able to get an accurate picture of its progress. It is possible that the tasks of the institutions that led the redemption operation did not include obtaining reliable data on the results of its operation. After the peasant reform of 1861, nobles were still exempted from most taxes. Until the 1880s, out of the total direct taxes, about 16/17 accounted for the poor rural population and only 1/17 to all other classes. By abolishing serfdom, the state did not revise the tax system.

In 1883, the foundation was laid in the transformation of direct taxes: in the period from 1883 to 1887, the poll tax was completely abolished, instead of which other taxes were introduced. The reform also began in the field of indirect taxes, which looked on the part of the Government as another attempt to solve the budget deficit problem. Nevertheless, the abolition of serfdom gave impetus to the development of industry and trade. In accordance with the report of the Ministry of Finance on its activities from 1855 to 1880, great success was achieved as a result of the reform. Over the 15-year period, the turnover of the factory industry has more than tripled; the turnover in foreign trade has quadrupled. Thanks to the ongoing reforms, it was possible to cover the expenses incurred during the wars.

The system of calculating and controlling state revenues and expenses was transformed. On 22 May 1862, the Rules on the preparation and execution of financial estimates and the state list of income and expenses were approved. The new system made it possible to obtain complete information on government revenues and expenditures. The ways of replenishing the treasury are determined by the wealth of the people and a good management system, the property of taxes and the way they are collected are only of secondary importance. If the state has the right approach to management, the tasks of the Ministry of Finance include finding ways to ensure and increase treasury income without depleting the people.

== Business activities ==
The industrialists were waiting for the peasant reform, realizing that for the development of factory and commercial affairs free hands and a wide labor market were needed. The reform, it would seem, solved this problem, since the peasants, on the one hand, were freed from personal dependence, and on the other, many of them were ready to go to town to earn money. However, at first, other circumstances became decisive. In many factories, at the time of the abolition of serfdom, workers were not employed, but rather workers were attached to them. As soon as these people obtained their freedom, hatred of bonded labor forced them to leave work in droves and leave the factories, selling houses and gardens for nothing. The wages that increased several times did not help return the workers. Therefore, early on after the reform, many enterprises reduced production. This was especially characteristic of iron mills and cloth factories, which on a large scale used the labor of serfs. Only 10 years later, having mastered the new conditions, did they begin to increase their production.

New opportunities for entrepreneurial activity opened up after the reform of 1861. The beginning of the construction of railways made it possible to reorganize the heavy industry in a short time and seriously revive business in joint-stock activities. The development and reorganization of industry at that time was facilitated by the influx of foreign capital. In the 1890s century. in Russia, the industrial base of entrepreneurship was finally formed and began to be established, and at the beginning of the 20th century it has already become a mass phenomenon.

In the same period, a labor market was formed, a joint-stock form of entrepreneurship was developing, and private joint-stock banks were opened – commercial, land and others. It is curious that by the beginning of the 20th century. in the Russian economy, 2/3 of all industrial production was produced at joint-stock, unit and other enterprises of collective forms of entrepreneurial activity. Moreover, the highest incomes came from investments in cotton production, in trade and credit. Thus, the process of monopolization of firms began.

According to the historian Alex M. Feldman, the monopolization of new industries followed older forms of feudalism as in the Byzantine economy; the laws governing access to land ownership were comensurate with the laws governing access to bullion, rendering the Political economy of the Russian Empire into essentially Mercantilism despite its industrialization. The abolition of serfdom pushed the accelerated change of feudal serfdom to bourgeois–capitalist relations. Monetary relations began to develop. A number of large-scale industries were created and developed. During this process, the number of industrial workers in both the public and private sectors grew. The number of equipped companies rapidly increased, and the production rate became higher. The market also did not stand still. With the help of a growing network of railways, new capitalist relations spread throughout Russia. A new credit system was created (mutual credit societies, commercial banks). European financial circles also took part in these development.
