= Portrait of William Harrison Ainsworth =

Painting by Daniel Maclise

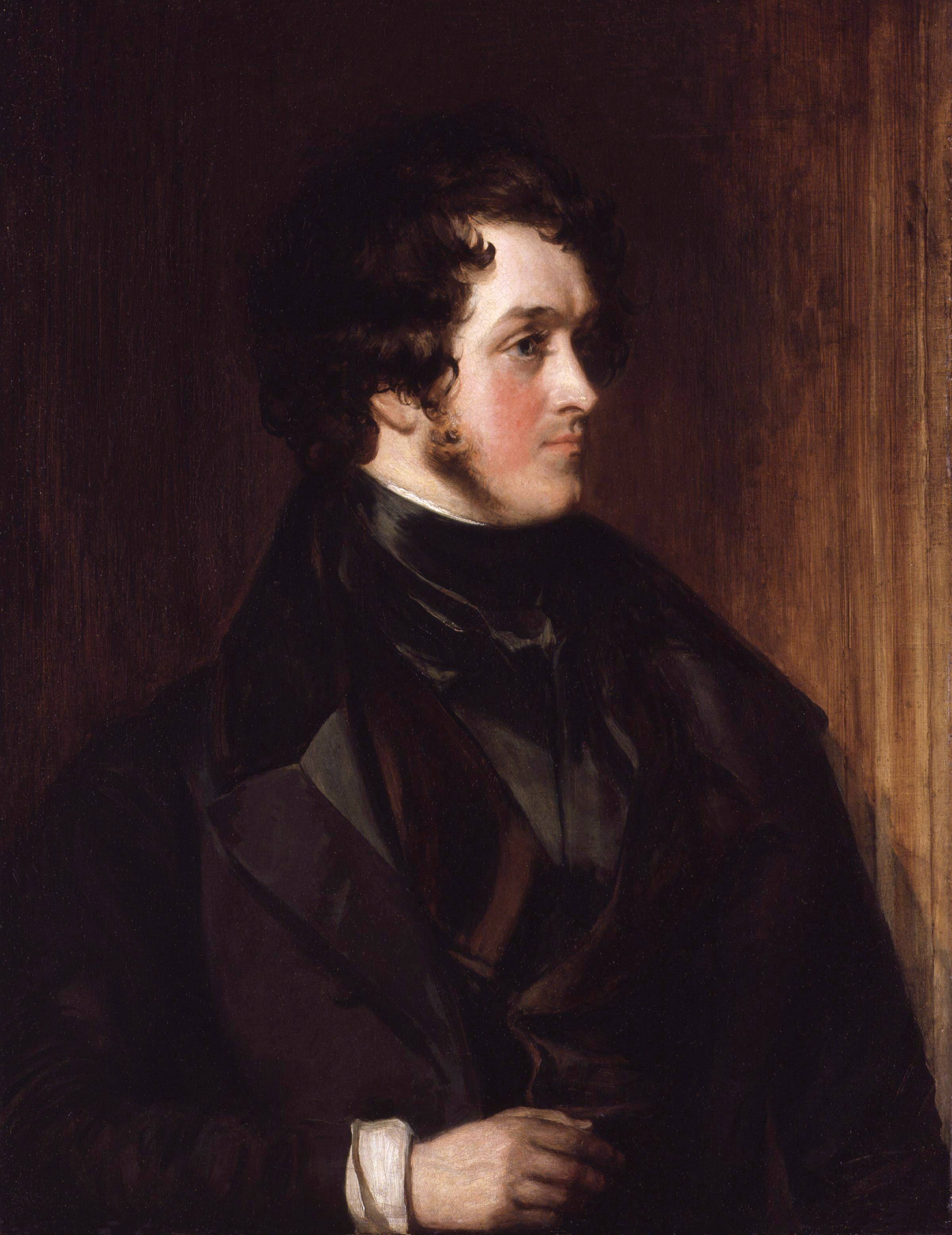
- Artist: Daniel Maclise
- Year: c. 1834
- Type: Oil on canvas, portrait painting
- Dimensions: 91.4 cm × 70.5 cm (36.0 in × 27.8 in)
- Location: National Portrait Gallery; London

Portrait of William Harrison Ainsworth is an oil on canvas portrait painting by the Irish artist Daniel Maclise, from c. 1834. It depicts the English author William Harrison Ainsworth, a popular author of historical novels and a contemporary and friend of Dickens.

The portrait is very similar to an illustration by Maclise that appeared in Fraser's Magazine in July 1834. If so it was produced the same year as his breakthrough novel Rookwood was published. Two years later an engraving of it was used to illustrate the frontispiece of the fourth edition of the novel. Today the painting is in the collection National Portrait Gallery in London, having been acquired in 1949. A later painting of the writer by Maclise was displayed at the Royal Academy Exhibition of 1844 and engraved by Edward Francis Finden.

== Bibliography ==
- Carver, Stephen James. The Life and Works of the Lancashire Novelist William Harrison Ainsworth, 1850-1882. Edwin Mellen Press, 2003.
- Ormond, Richard. Early Victorian Portraits, National Portrait Gallery, 1974.
- Weston, Nancy. Daniel Maclise: Irish Artist in Victorian London. Four Courts Press, 2001.
