= The Death of Nelson (Maclise painting) =

1859–1864 painting by Daniel Maclise

The Death of Nelson (finished study)
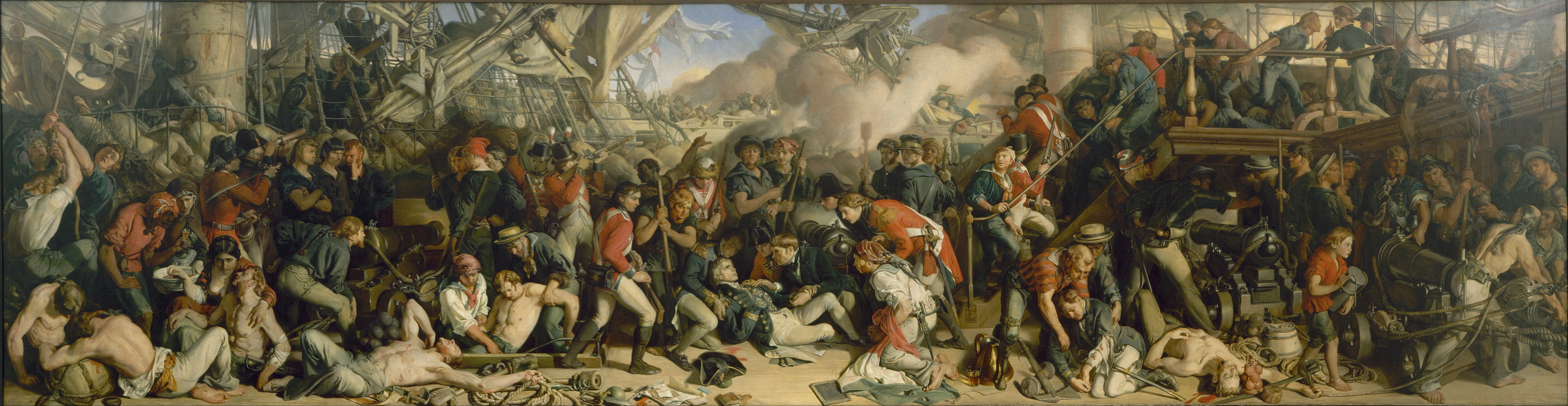
- Artist: Daniel Maclise
- Year: 1859–1864
- Medium: Oil on canvas
- Dimensions: 98.5 cm × 353 cm (38.8 in × 139 in)
- Location: Walker Art Gallery, Liverpool

The Death of Nelson is a wall painting in the Royal Gallery of the Palace of Westminster by the Irish artist Daniel Maclise. A finished study for it, in the form of a painting, is in the Walker Art Gallery in Liverpool, Merseyside.

== History ==
Maclise received the commission for two wall paintings in the Royal Gallery in 1857; these were to depict The Meeting of Wellington and Blücher after the Battle of Waterloo and The Death of Nelson. However Maclise found that creating the works in fresco would prove too difficult, and he resigned the commission. He then discovered the waterglass technique (infusing the surface with sodium silicate) and resumed the commission. Maclise started work on The Meeting of Wellington and Blücher in January 1860 and completed it during the winter of 1861. He then submitted a sketch for The Death of Nelson to the Fine Arts Commission. However Prince Albert, the prime promoter of the commission, died in 1861 and the Commission lost some of its momentum. It was not until 1863 that Maclise received permission to continue with the scheme. Between 1859 and 1864 Maclise created a plan for this picture; this was a painting that comprised a "finished study" for the work. This painting was purchased by the Walker Art Gallery in 1892 from the Art Union of London; the money for this was obtained from the Liverpool Naval Exhibition. The wall paintings did not survive well; by 1869 the colours were fading. However modern critics continue to praise "their serious and sombre realism and their expressive power".

== The two paintings ==
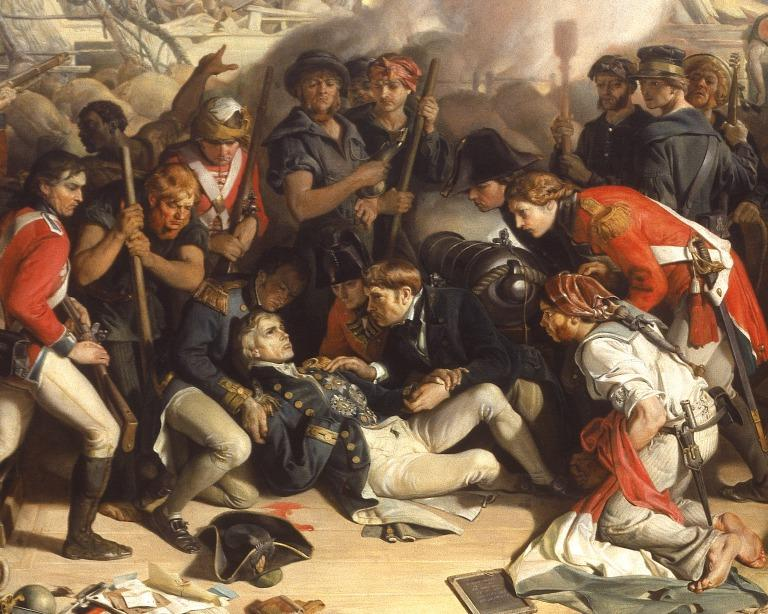
Detail from The Death of Nelson in the Palace of Westminster

The study, copied for the wall painting, was created in 1859–1864 and is organised as a frieze, in a long narrow format. It shows the dying Admiral Nelson on the deck of HMS Victory, cradled in the arms of Captain Hardy, with other figures, including Dr Beatty, leaning over him. They are surrounded by members of the crew. Maclise took trouble over the accuracy of details in the picture; he interviewed survivors of the battle and researched the naval equipment in use at the time. However the painting is not an accurate account of the event, because Nelson was quickly taken below decks, where he died; it is rather an idealisation of the event. Included in the painting are two black people; this is likely to be historically accurate as two men from Africa were included in the crew of HMS Victory. At this time people of African descent were integrated with other members of the crew, although they tended to work in the lower ranks. One of the Africans is pointing towards the assassin of Nelson.

== The engraving ==
The Maclise painting was engraved by Charles W. Sharpe in 1876 and published by the Art Union of London. It sold widely around the British Empire. The Nelson engraving was often sold with an engraving of the 1861 companion work by Maclise, The Meeting of Wellington and Blücher after the Battle of Waterloo.

== Other depictions of the event ==
In the 19th century the death of Nelson was a popular subject for artists. Other notable paintings of the event include The Death of Nelson, 21 October 1805 by Arthur William Devis in 1805 and now found at the National Maritime Museum, and The Death of Nelson by Benjamin West in 1806 and now at the Walker Art Gallery.
