= The Meeting of Wellington and Blücher after the Battle of Waterloo =

1861 wall painting by Daniel Maclise

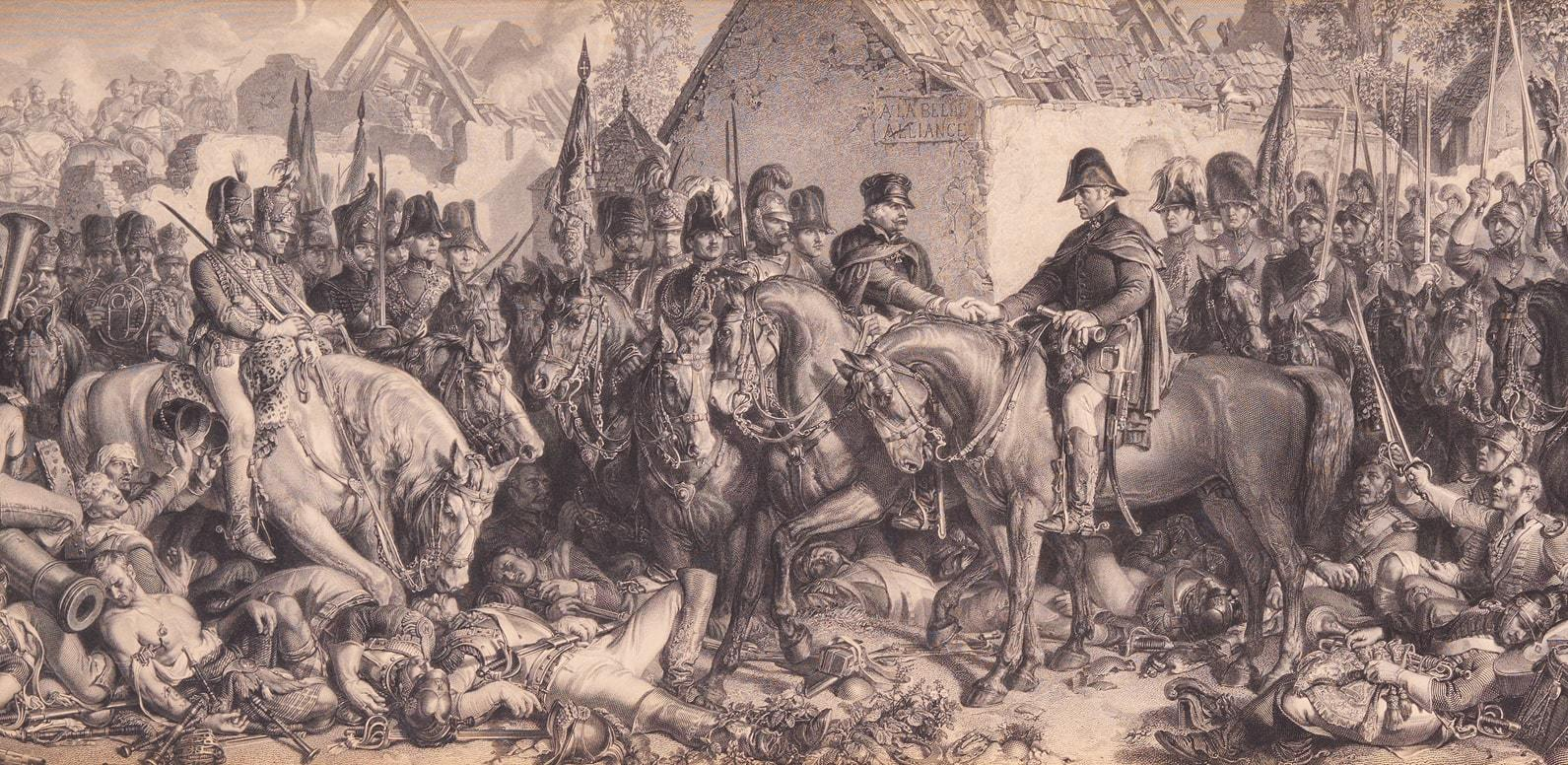
The central part, in a print of 1879

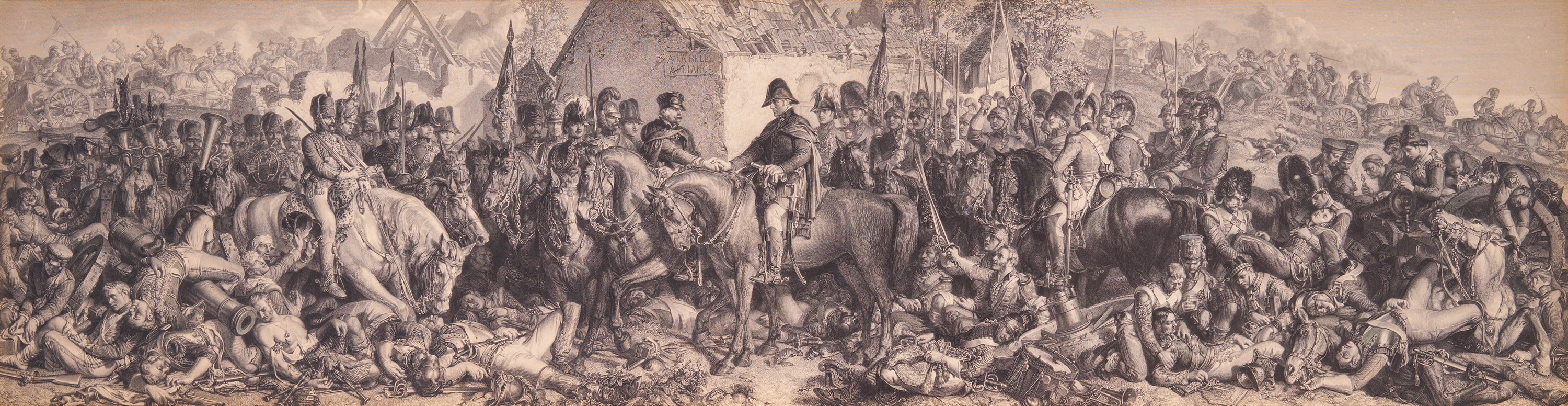
The full composition, in a print of 1879

The Meeting of Wellington and Blücher after the Battle of Waterloo is a monumental wall painting by Irish painter Daniel Maclise, completed in 1861. It depicts the moment towards the end of the Battle of Waterloo on 18 June 1815, when the commanders of the allied British and Prussian armies, the Duke of Wellington and Marshal Blücher, met near La Belle Alliance. Measuring 3.68 by 13.92 metres (12.1 ft × 45.7 ft), it is displayed in the Royal Gallery at the Palace of Westminster.

The work was commissioned in 1858, to decorate the newly reconstructed Palace of Westminster. Maclise first completed a full-size cartoon as a preparatory work in 1859, which is in the collection of the Royal Academy of Arts, and the painting was completed in 1861. It was intended to be a part of a series of 18 paintings by Maclise to decorate the Royal Gallery, but only two large panels were finished. The other large panel, The Death of Nelson, completed in 1865, depicts the death of Admiral Nelson at the Battle of Trafalgar in 1805 (a full-size sketch for the Death of Nelson was purchased by the Walker Art Gallery in 1892). Prince Albert was one of the principal supporters of the project, but progress with the project was slow, and the remaining 16 pictures were cancelled after Albert's death in 1861.

== Waterloo Cartoon ==
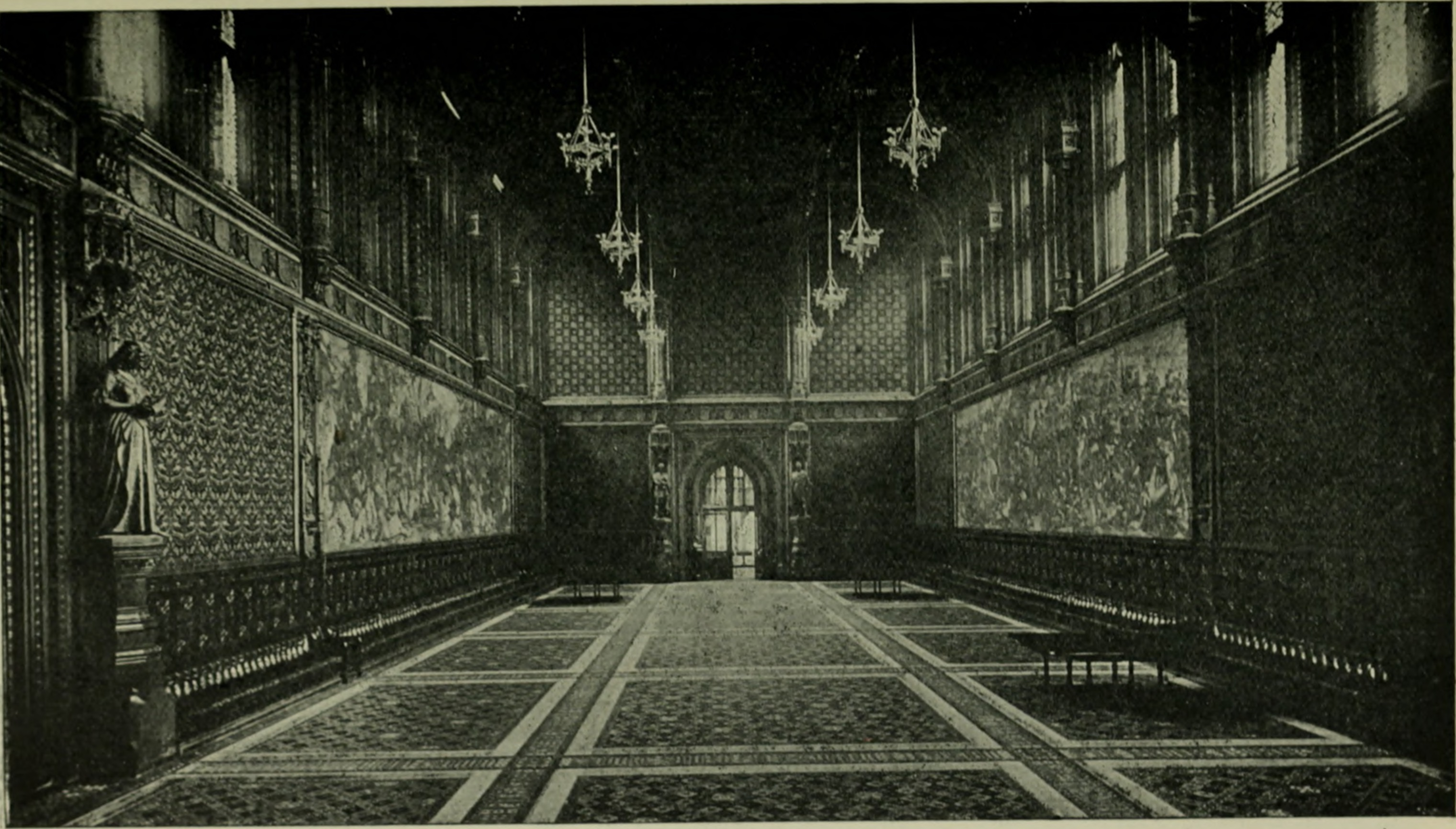
View of the Royal Gallery in 1911, with The Meeting of Wellington and Blücher after the Battle of Waterloo to the right, and The Death of Nelson to the left

Maclise was commissioned to decorate the new Royal Gallery after he completed frescoes showing The Spirit of Chivalry and The Spirit of Justice in the new chamber for the House of Lords in the 1840s.

Maclise started work on a full-size preparatory cartoon, the Waterloo Cartoon, in March 1858. The cartoon is divided into 10 panels and is over 13 metres (43 ft) wide, with the figures depicted life size. It was enthusiastically received when it was displayed in 1859. Maclise died in 1870, and the cartoon was acquired by the Royal Academy the same year. It was displayed at Burlington House until the 1920s. After 40 years in store, the Waterloo Cartoon was conserved and put on display at Royal Armouries in Leeds and the Royal Academy for the 200th anniversary of the Battle of Waterloo in 2015.

== Description ==
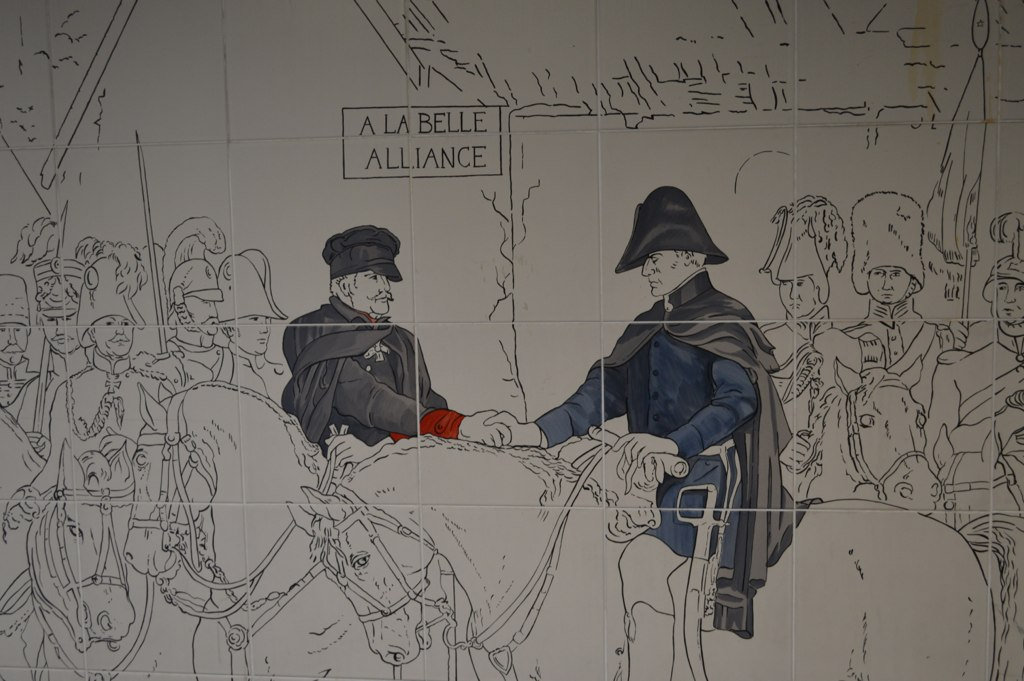
Wellington and Blücher from Maclise's painting, reproduced in the underpass at Hyde Park Corner

Maclise started work on the painting in January 1860, and completed it during the winter of 1861. It was initially intended to be a fresco, with paint applied to wet plaster, but the work was completed using a waterglass technique, applying paint to dry plaster and then fixing it with potassium silicate. The completed painting measures 3.68 by 13.92 metres (12.1 ft × 45.7 ft).

The scene is set in front of La Belle Alliance, an inn a few miles south of Brussels, around which was fought the Battle of Waterloo. At the centre of the painting is Wellington, soberly dressed in a plain uniform with cloak and "fore-and-aft" bicorn cocked hat, holding a telescope, and mounted on his horse Copenhagen, shaking hands with Blücher. A French eagle standard lies discarded beneath his horse's feet. He is attended by Captain Lord Arthur Hill, Major-General Lord Edward Somerset and Major the Hon. Henry Percy, who carried the Waterloo Dispatch to London, with escorts from the Life Guards and the 1st Regiment of the Royal Horse Guards (the Blues).

Slightly left of centre, Blücher is depicted wearing a forage cap (originally Maclise portrayed him with a feathered cocked hat, but later changed it), and is attended by his generals August Ludwig von Nostitz, Prince Frederick of Prussia, August Neidhardt von Gneisenau, Hans Ernst Karl von Zieten, Friedrich Wilhelm Freiherr von Bülow, and Karl von Grolman. To the left are two British cavalry officers, Colonel Sir John Ormsby Vandeleur, and Major-General Sir Hussey Vivian on a white horse with sloped sword.

The scene is crowded with soldiers and other bystanders, often in poses inspired by classical works, or Old Master paintings or more contemporary models. The emphasis to dead and dying soldiers may be derived from Antoine-Jean Gros's 1809 painting Napoléon on the Battlefield of Eylau. To the left is a broken artillery piece with some dead and wounded British and French soldiers piled up in a pyramidal composition reminiscent of Théodore Géricault's 1818-19 painting, Raft of the Medusa. One soldier has a tourniquet around his arm, and another's wound is being dressed by a surgeon. Behind them, a Prussian band are playing brass instruments: accounts from the battle report that the band played "God Save the King" at the meeting of Wellington and Blücher, to which the English replied with three cheers for the Prussians.

To the right, a Highland soldier from the Black Watch, an English Guardsman, and an Irish Fusilier, are carrying the body of Major the Hon. Frederick Howard (the "young, gallant Howard" mentioned in Lord Byron's poem Childe Harold's Pilgrimage) and a group of camp followers, including a vivandière or cantinière, a Sister of Charity, and a tonsured priest delivering the last rites to an officer. In the background, a peasant woman is looting from the dead on the battlefield. In the background, the army is advancing along a road.

The copyright was acquired by the Art Union of London in 1865, and Lumb Stocks made an engraving of the painting from photographs of the original. It was often sold with an engraving of the companion work, The Death of Nelson.
