= Peter the Great at Deptford Dockyard =

Painting by Daniel Maclise

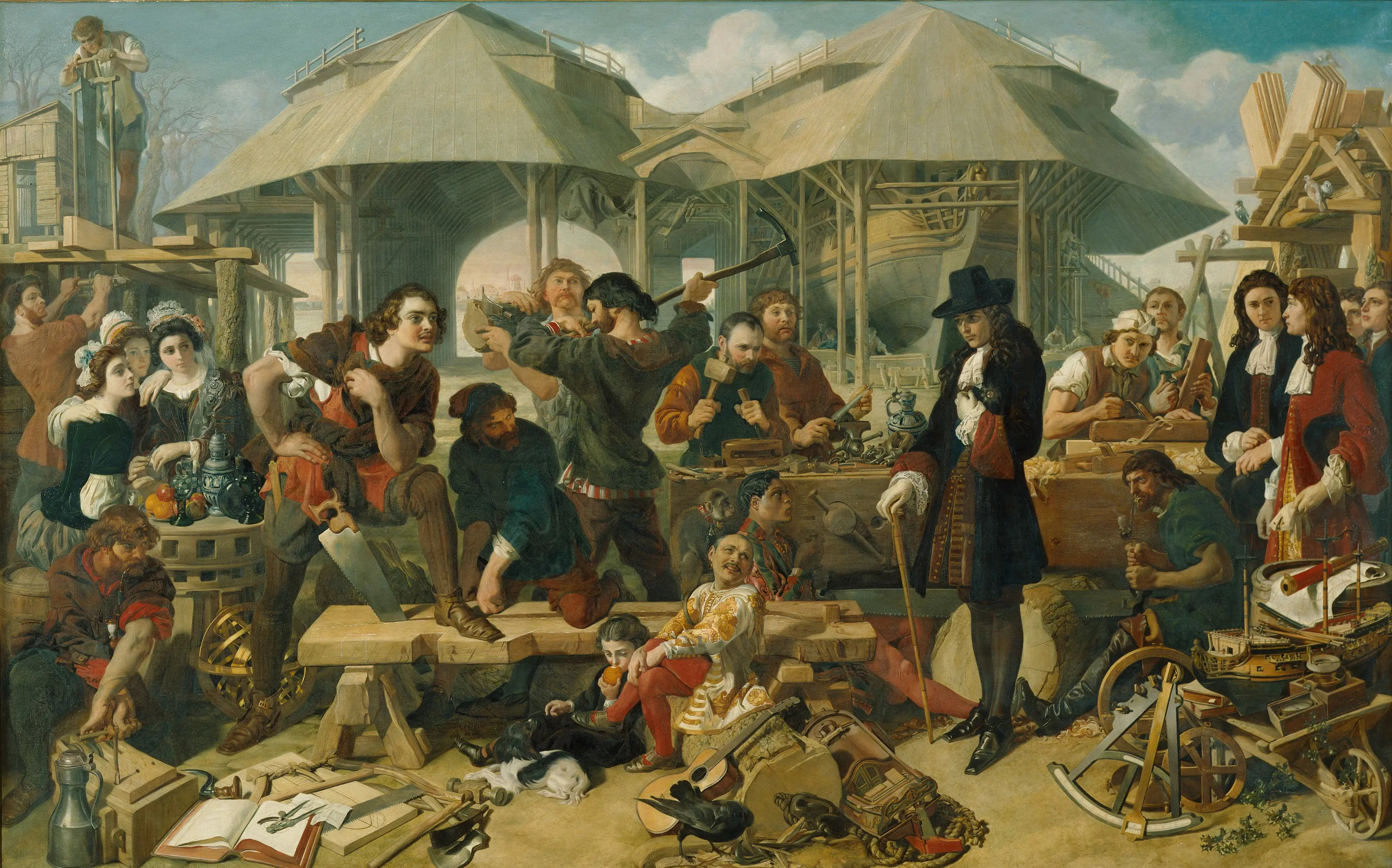
- Artist: Daniel Maclise
- Year: 1857
- Type: Oil on canvas, history painting
- Dimensions: 152.3 cm × 243.7 cm (60.0 in × 95.9 in)
- Location: Royal Holloway, London

Peter the Great at Deptford Dockyard is an 1857 history painting by the Irish artist Daniel Maclise. It depicts the a scene from the Grand Embassy of Peter the Great, when the Tsar Peter made a visit to Deptford Dockyard on the River Thames to study shipbuilding methods. It was one of a number of paintings during the Victorian era that depict manual labour including Work by Ford Madox Brown and Iron and Coal by William Bell Scott.

The painting was displayed at the Royal Academy's Summer Exhibition of 1857 at the National Gallery in London. It was acquired by the art collector Thomas Holloway who donated it along with many other works to Royal Holloway.

== Bibliography ==
- Louttit, Chris. Dickens's Secular Gospel: Work, Gender, and Personality. Routledge, 2009.
- Murray, Peter. Daniel Maclise, 1806-1870: Romancing the Past. Crawford Art Gallery, 2008.
- Weston, Nancy. Daniel Maclise: Irish Artist in Victorian London. Four Courts Press, 2009.
