= Daniel Maclise =

Irish painter and illustrator (1806–1870)

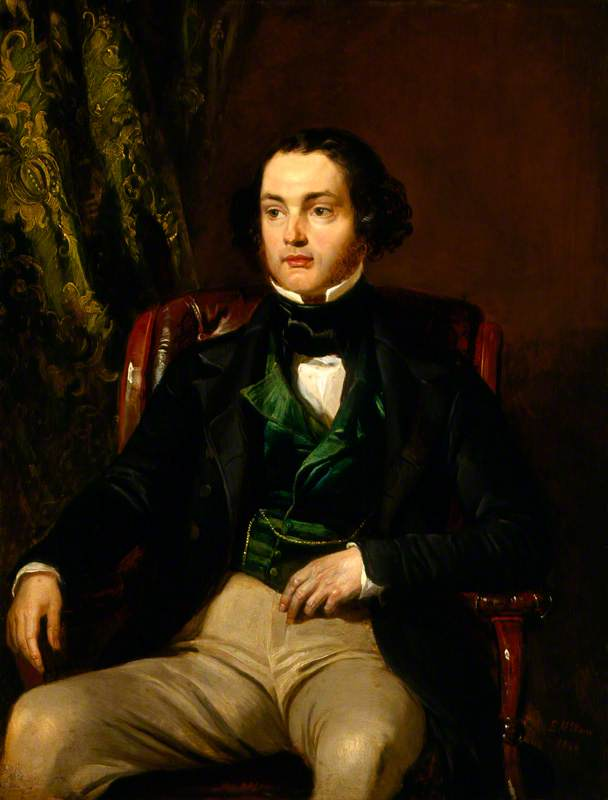
- Portrait of Daniel Maclise by Edward Matthew Ward, 1846
- Born: 25 January 1806; Cork, Ireland
- Died: 25 April 1870 (aged 64); Chelsea, England
- Known for: History painting; Portrait painting

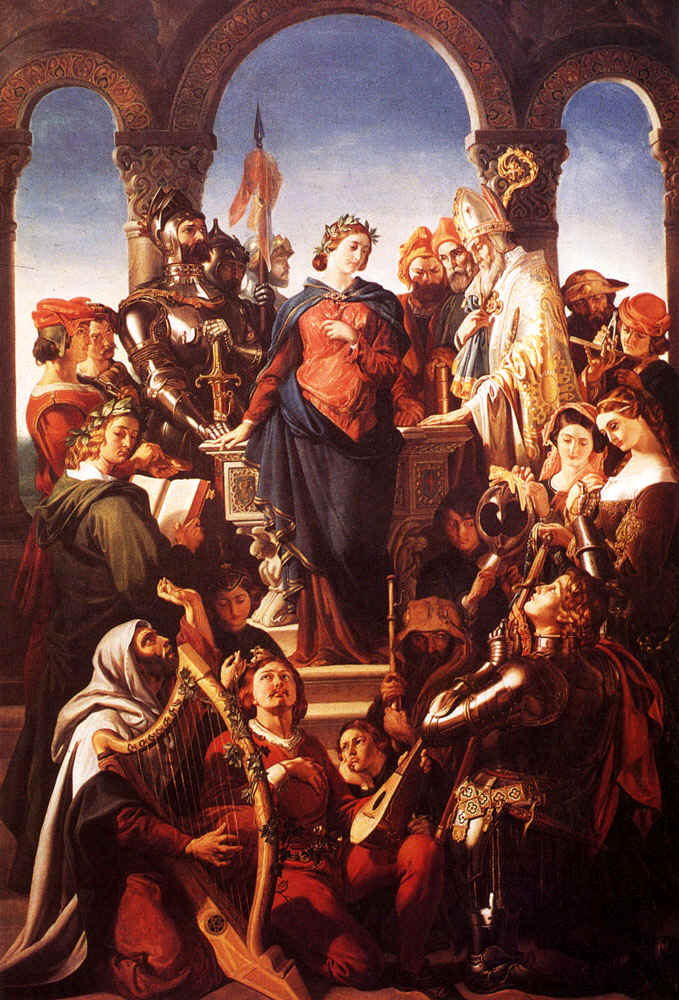
Maclise's Spirit of Chivalry, oil on canvas, 50 x 33 5/8 inches (127.00 x 85.60 cm), Private collection.

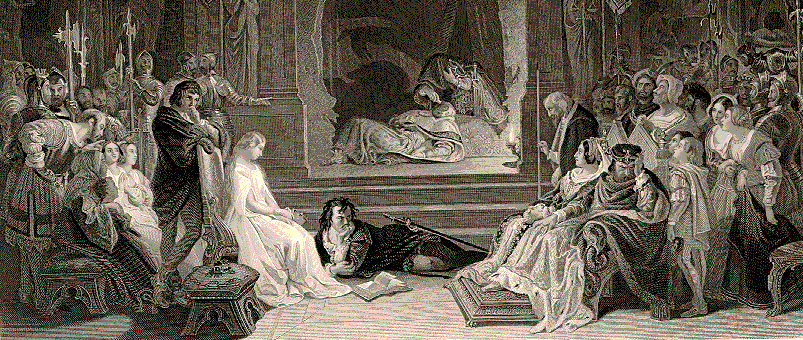
A detail of the engraving of Maclise's 1842 painting The Play-scene in Hamlet, portraying the moment when the guilt of Claudius is revealed.

Daniel Maclise RA (25 January 1806 – 25 April 1870) was an Irish history painter, literary and portrait painter, and illustrator, who worked for most of his life in London, England. His works included a series of murals at the Palace of Westminster, among them The Death of Nelson.

== Early life ==
Maclise was born in Cork, Ireland, the son of Alexander McLish (also McLeish, McLish, McClisse or McLise), a Scotsman who had come to Ireland with the army and subsequently become a tanner and shoemaker. His education was of the plainest kind, but he was eager for culture, fond of reading, and anxious to become an artist. His father, however, placed him in employment, in 1820, in Newenham's Bank, where he remained for two years, before leaving to study at the Cork School of Art. In 1825, Sir Walter Scott was travelling in Ireland, and Maclise, having seen him in a bookseller's shop, made a surreptitious sketch of him, which he afterwards lithographed. The print became very popular, and led to many commissions for portraits, which he executed in pencil.

Various influential friends recognised Maclise's genius and promise, and were anxious to furnish him with the means of studying in London; but refusing all financial assistance, he saved the money himself and arrived in the capital on 18 July 1827. There he made a sketch of Charles John Kean, the actor, which, like his portrait of Scott, was lithographed and published, making the artist a considerable sum. He entered the Royal Academy schools in 1828, eventually being awarded the highest prizes open to students.

== Career ==
Maclise exhibited for the first time at the Royal Academy Exhibition of 1829 at Somerset House. Gradually he began to confine himself more exclusively to subject and historical pictures, varied occasionally by portraits – such as those of Lord Campbell, novelist Letitia Landon, Dickens, and other of his literary friends. In 1833, he exhibited two pictures which greatly increased his reputation, and in 1835 the Chivalric Vow of the Ladies and the Peacock procured his election as associate of the Academy, of which he became full member in 1840. The years that followed were occupied with a long series of figure pictures, deriving their subjects from history and tradition and from the works of Shakespeare, Goldsmith and Le Sage.

He also designed illustrations for several of Dickens's Christmas books and other works. Between the years 1830 and 1836 he contributed to Fraser's Magazine, under the pseudonym of Alfred Croquis, a remarkable series of portraits of the literary and other celebrities of the time – character studies, etched or lithographed in outline, and touched more or less with the emphasis of the caricaturist, which were afterwards published as the Maclise Portrait Gallery (1871). During the rebuilding of the Houses of Parliament in London in 1834–1850 by Charles Barry, Maclise was commissioned in 1846 to paint murals in the House of Lords on such subjects as Justice and Chivalry.

In 1858, Maclise commenced one of the two great monumental works of his life, The Meeting of Wellington and Blücher after the Battle of Waterloo, on the walls of Westminster Palace. It was begun in fresco, a process which proved unmanageable. The artist wished to resign the task, but, encouraged by Prince Albert, he studied in Berlin the new method of water-glass painting, and carried out the subject and its companion, The Death of Nelson, in that medium, completing the latter painting in 1864.

Maclise's vast painting of The Marriage of Strongbow and Aoife (1854) hangs in the National Gallery of Ireland, Dublin. It portrays the marriage of the main Norman conqueror of Ireland "Strongbow" to the daughter of his Gaelic ally. The painting is said to relate Maclise's nationalist feelings and his knowledge of ancient, Irish, civilization.

By the grand staircase of Halifax Town Hall, which was completed in 1863, there is a wall painting by Maclise.

The intense application which he gave to these great historic works, and various circumstances connected with the commission, had a serious effect on the artist's health. He began to shun the company in which he formerly delighted, his old buoyancy of spirits was gone, and when, in 1865, the presidency of the Royal Academy was offered to him he declined the honour. He died of acute pneumonia on 25 April 1870 at his home 4 Cheyne Walk, Chelsea.

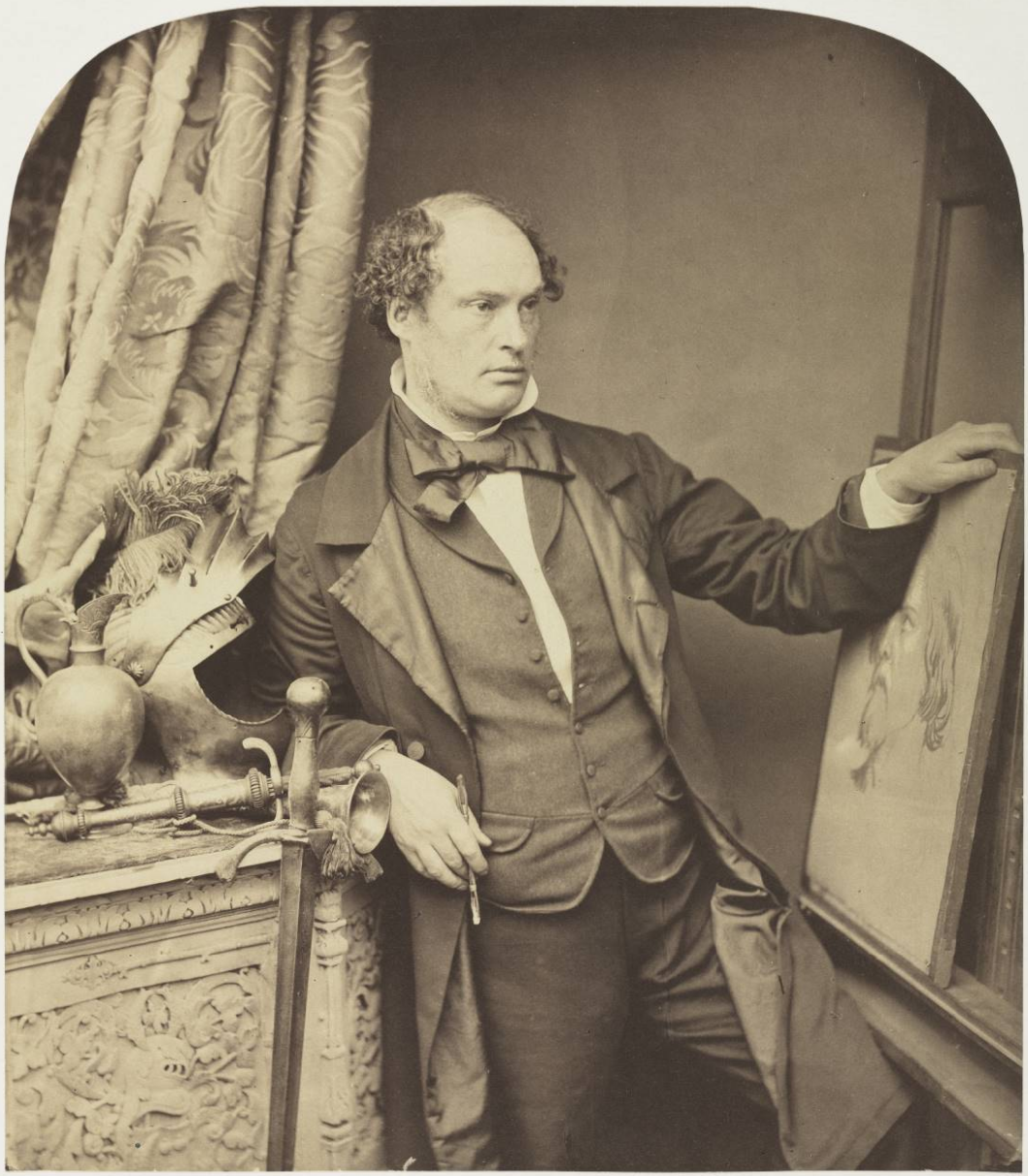
Maclise photographed by William Lake Price, 1857

His works are distinguished by powerful intellectual and imaginative qualities, but, in the opinion of William Monkhouse, a late Victorian critic, somewhat marred by harsh and dull colouring, by metallic hardness of surface and texture, and by frequent touches of the theatrical in the action and attitudes of the figures. His fame rests most securely on his two greatest works at Westminster.

A memoir of Maclise, by his friend William Justin O'Driscoll, was published in 1871.

== Posthumous exhibitions ==
=== National Portrait Gallery, 1972 ===
The works of Maclise in portraiture were celebrated in 1972 at an exhibition in the National Portrait Gallery.

=== Crawford Art Gallery, 2008 ===
The Crawford Art Gallery in Cork, Ireland, Maclise's native city, held a major exhibition of his works, Daniel Maclise: Romancing the Past (28 October 2008 - 14 February 2009), opened by David Puttnam.

=== Royal Academy, 2015 ===
The preliminary sketch for The Meeting of Wellington and Blücher was displayed at the Royal Academy of Arts from 2 September 2015 to 3 January 2016, to commemorate the 200th anniversary of the Battle of Waterloo. It had been displayed previously from 23 May until 23 August at the Royal Armouries in Leeds as part of the Waterloo 1815: The Art of Battle exhibition.

== Gallery ==
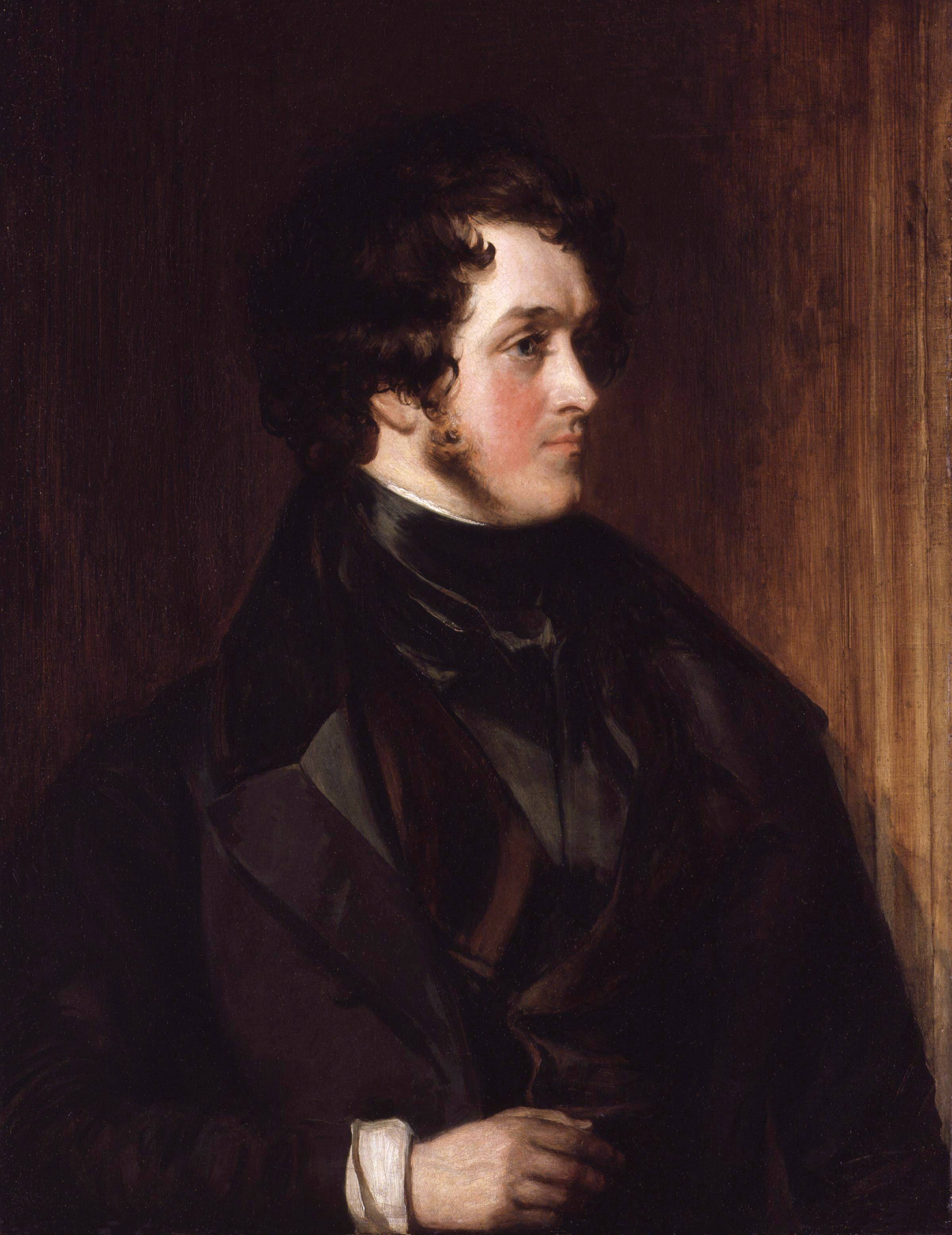
Portrait of William Harrison Ainsworth, 1834

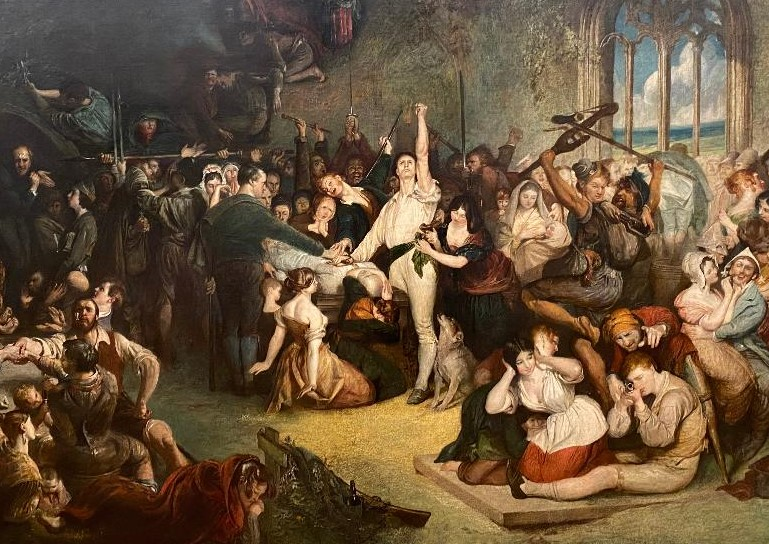
The Installation of Captain Rock, 1834

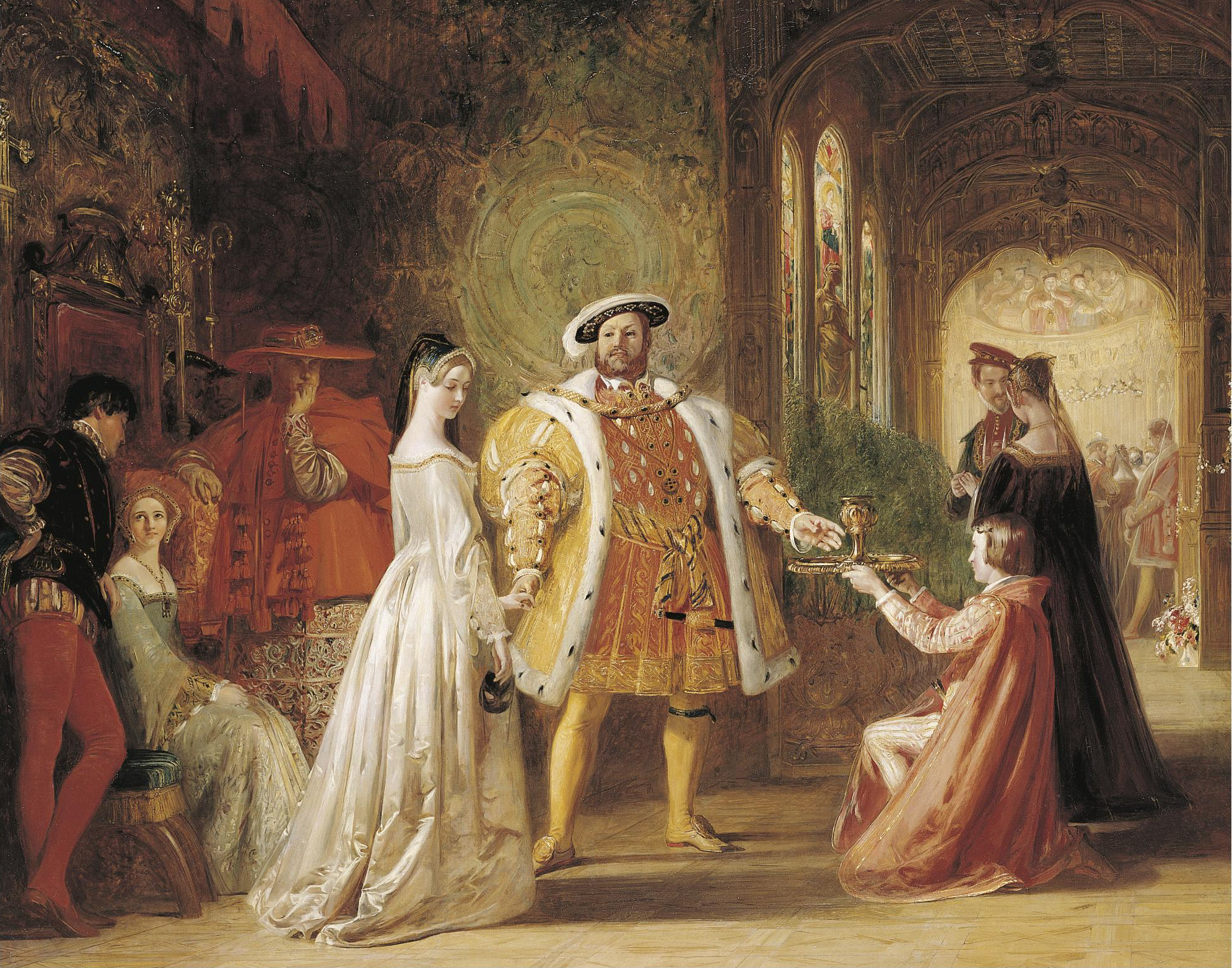
Henry VIII's First Meeting with Anne Boleyn, 1835

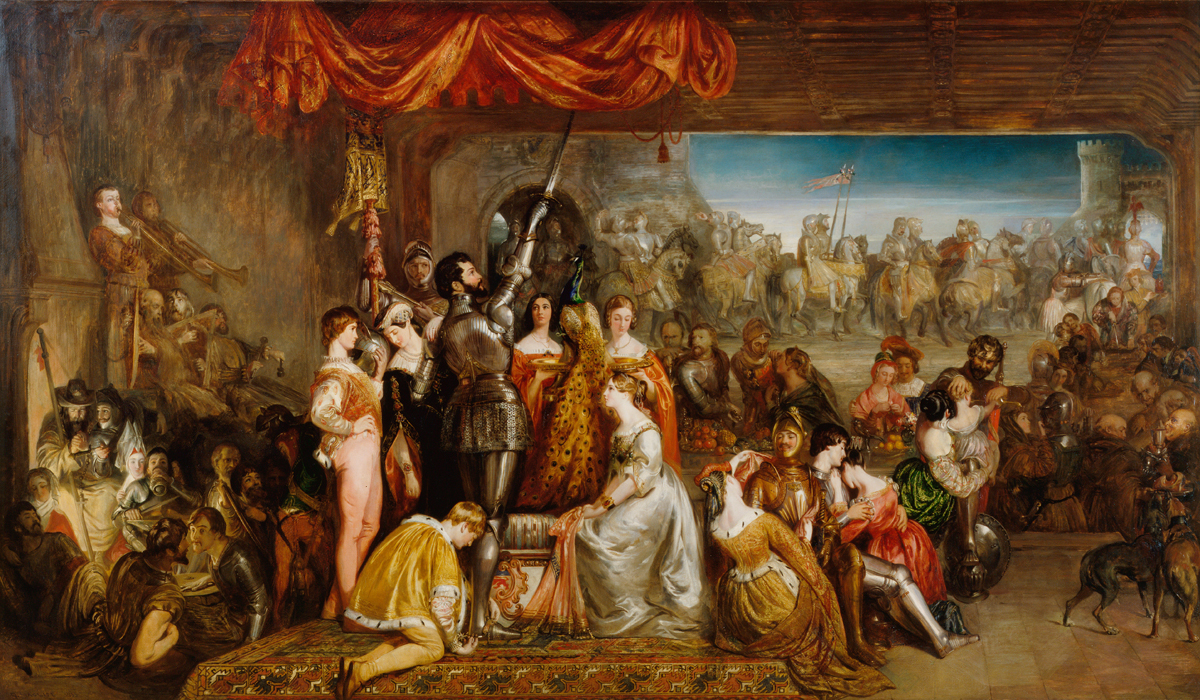
The Chivalric Vow of the Ladies of the Peacock, 1835

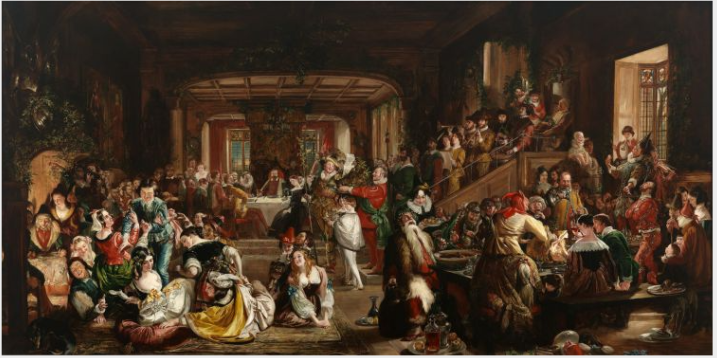
Merry Christmas in the Baron's Hall, 1838

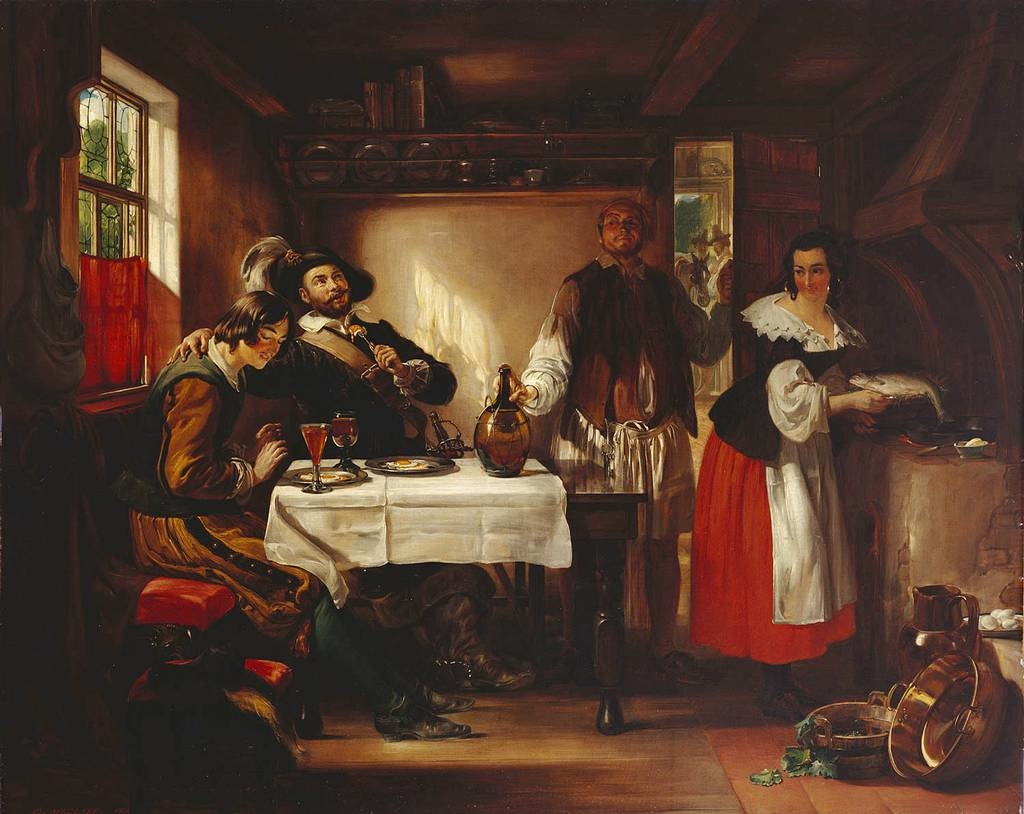
A Scene from Gil Blas, 1839

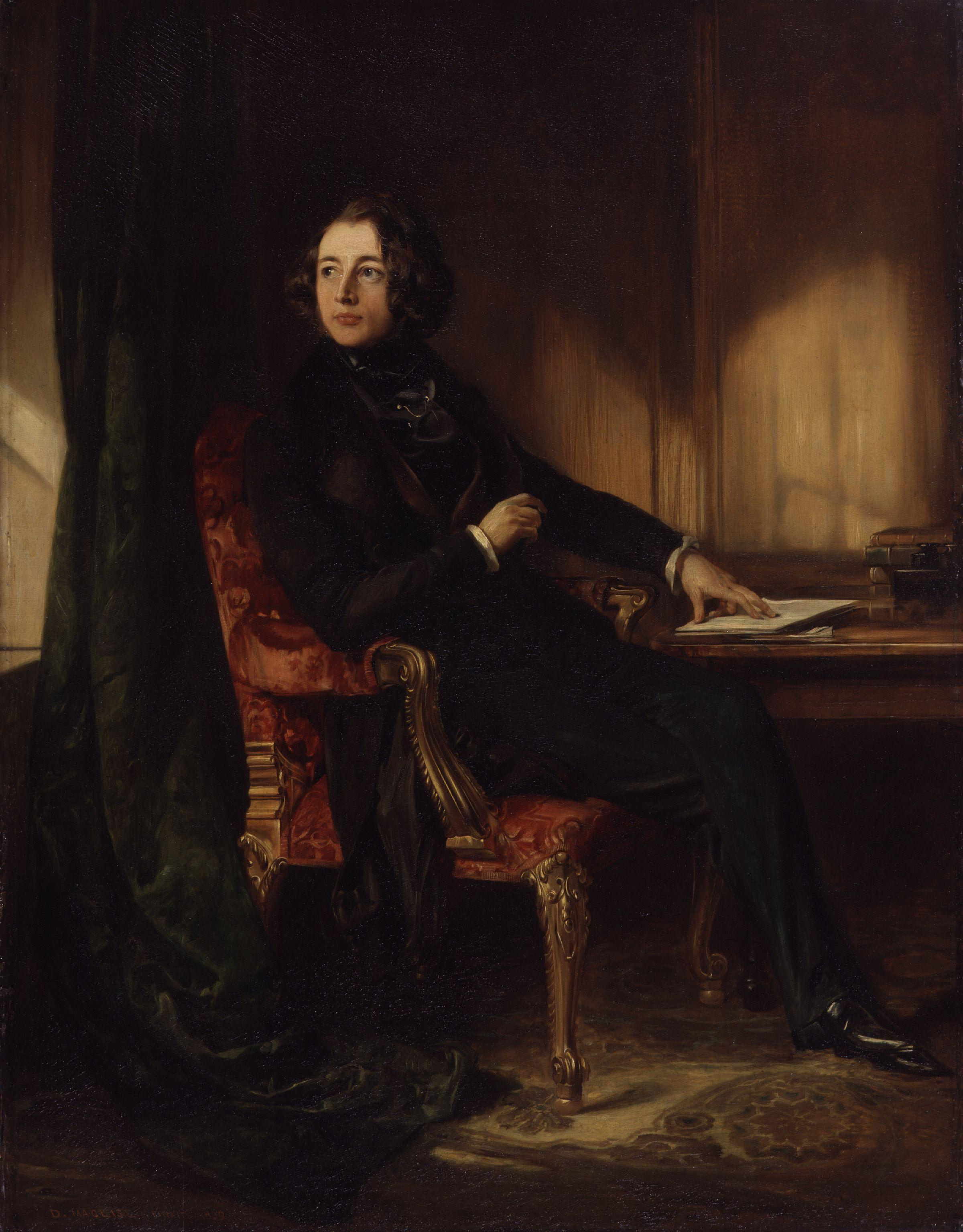
Portrait of Charles Dickens, 1839

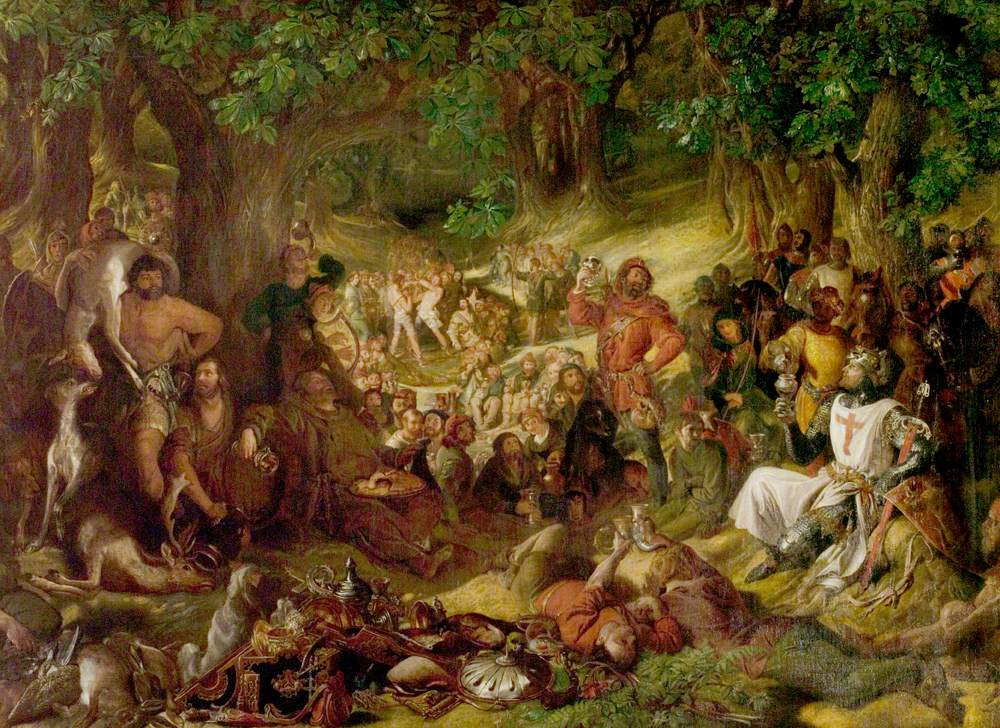
Robin Hood and His Merry Men Entertaining Richard the Lionheart in Sherwood Forest, 1839

The Banquet Scene in Macbeth, 1840

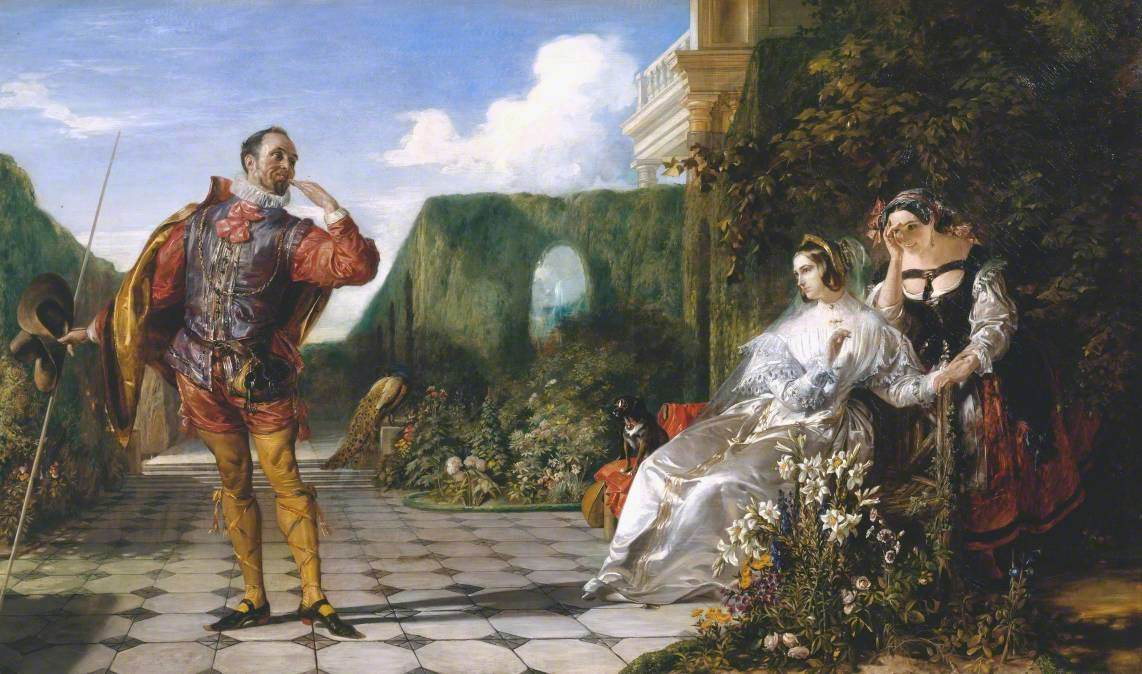
Malvolio and the Countess, 1840

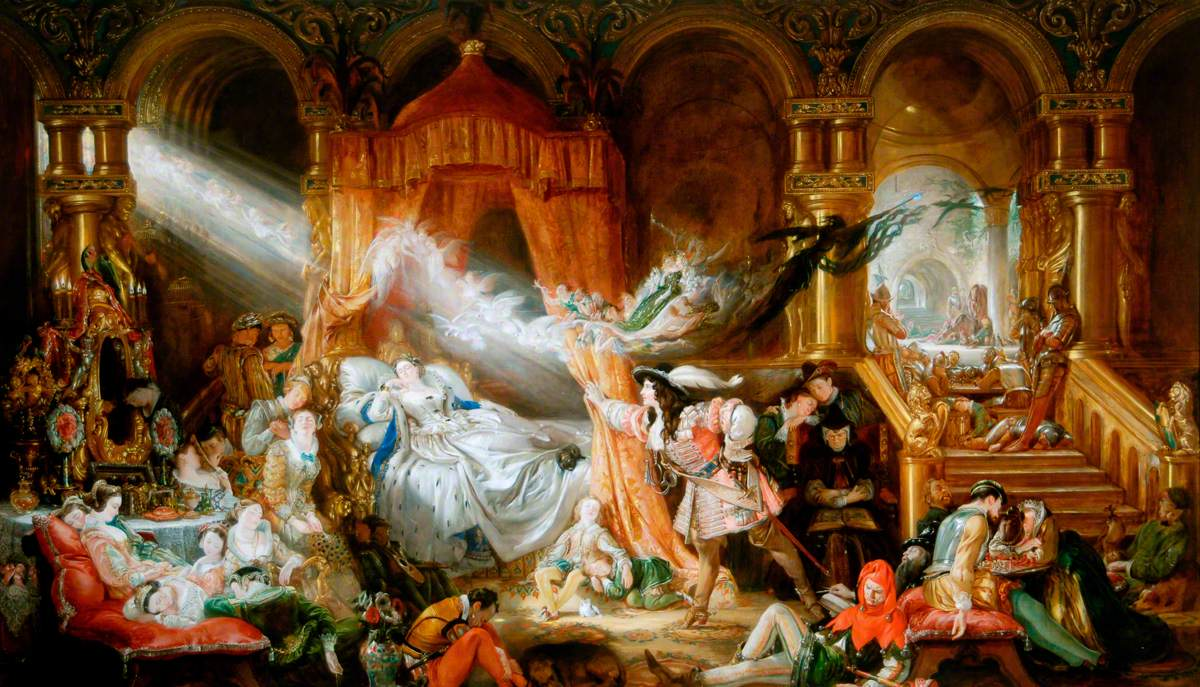
The Sleeping Beauty, 1841

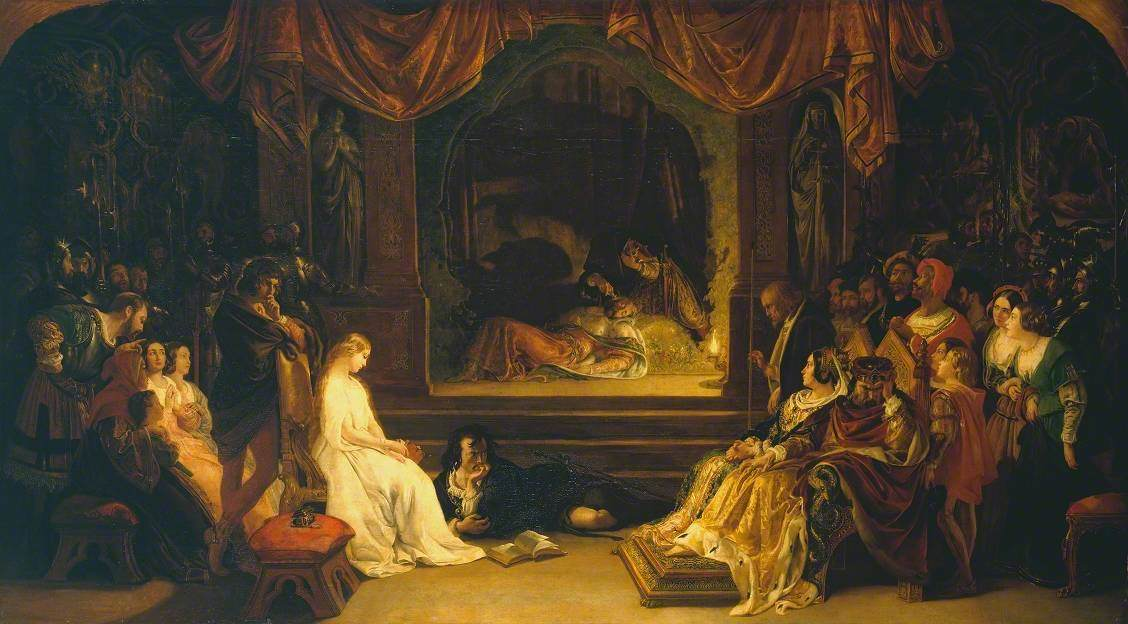
The Play Scene in Hamlet, 1842

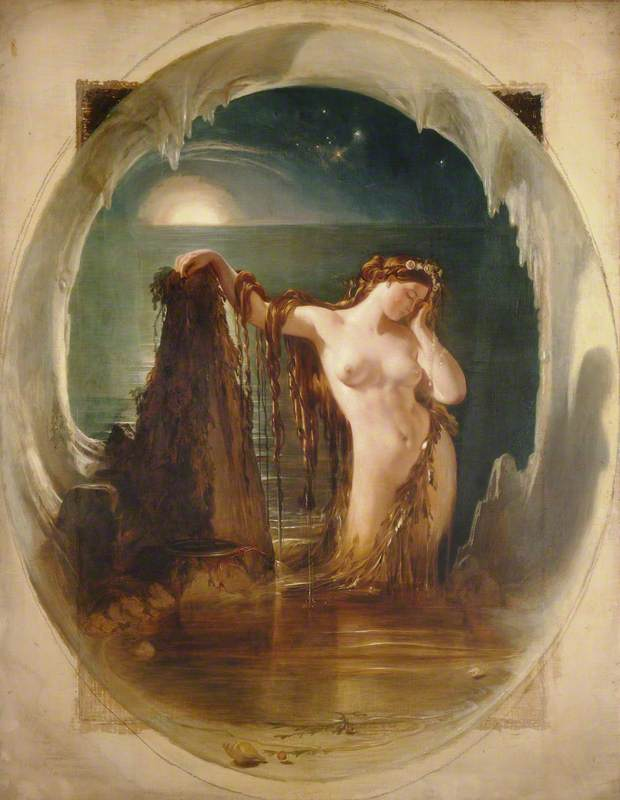
The Origin of the Harp, 1842

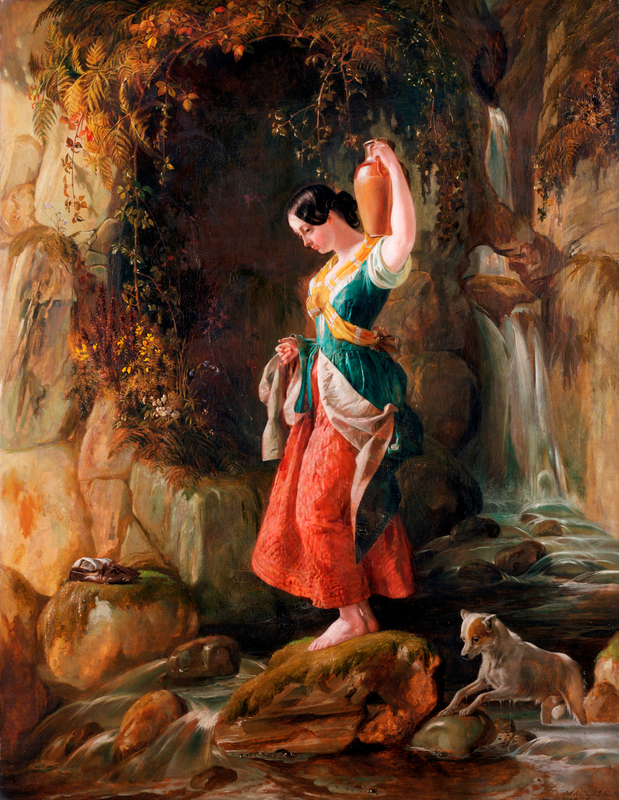
Waterfall at St Nighton's Kieve, 1842

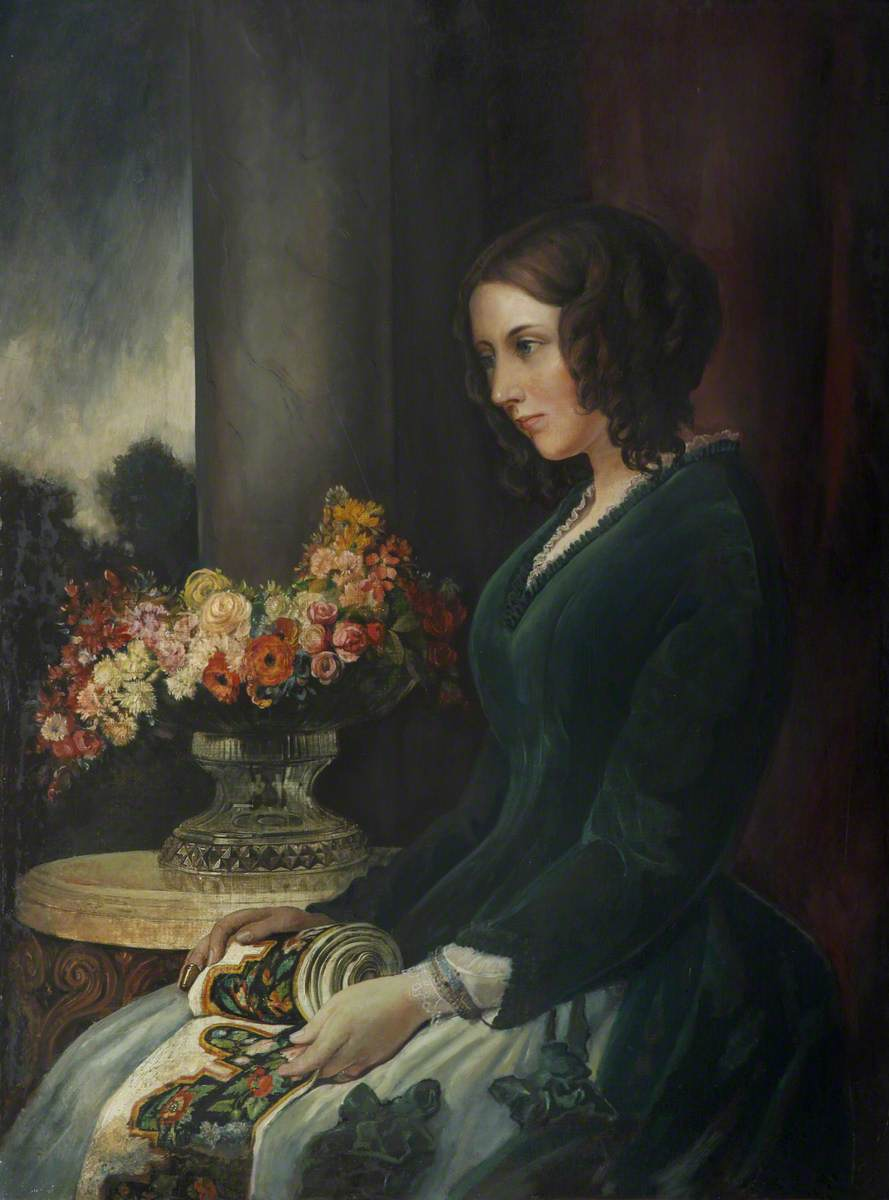
Portrait of Catherine Dickens, 1847

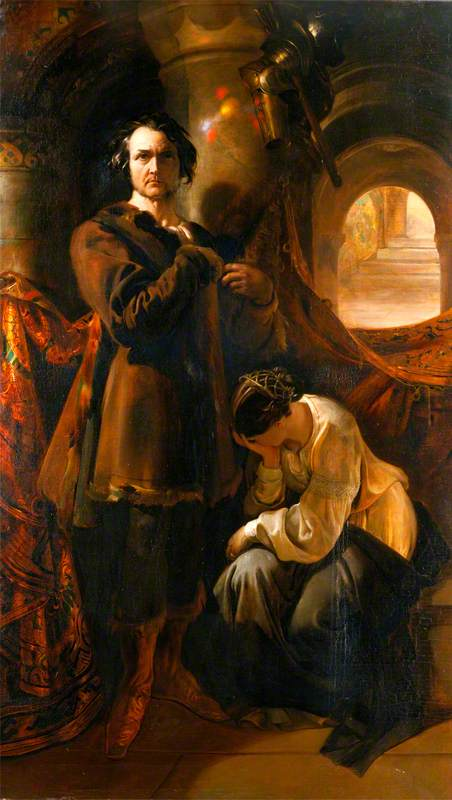
Macready as Werner, 1850

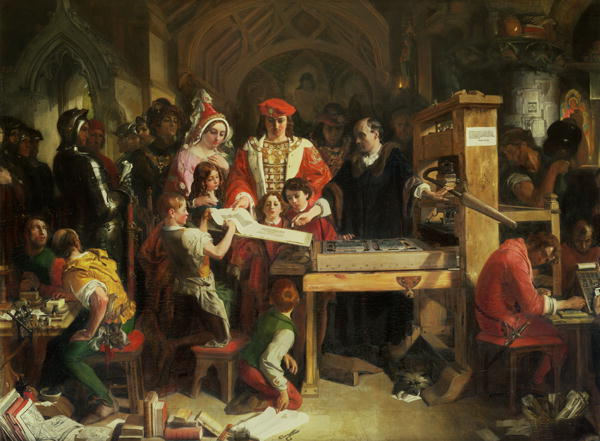
Caxton Showing the First Specimen of His Printing to King Edward IV, 1851

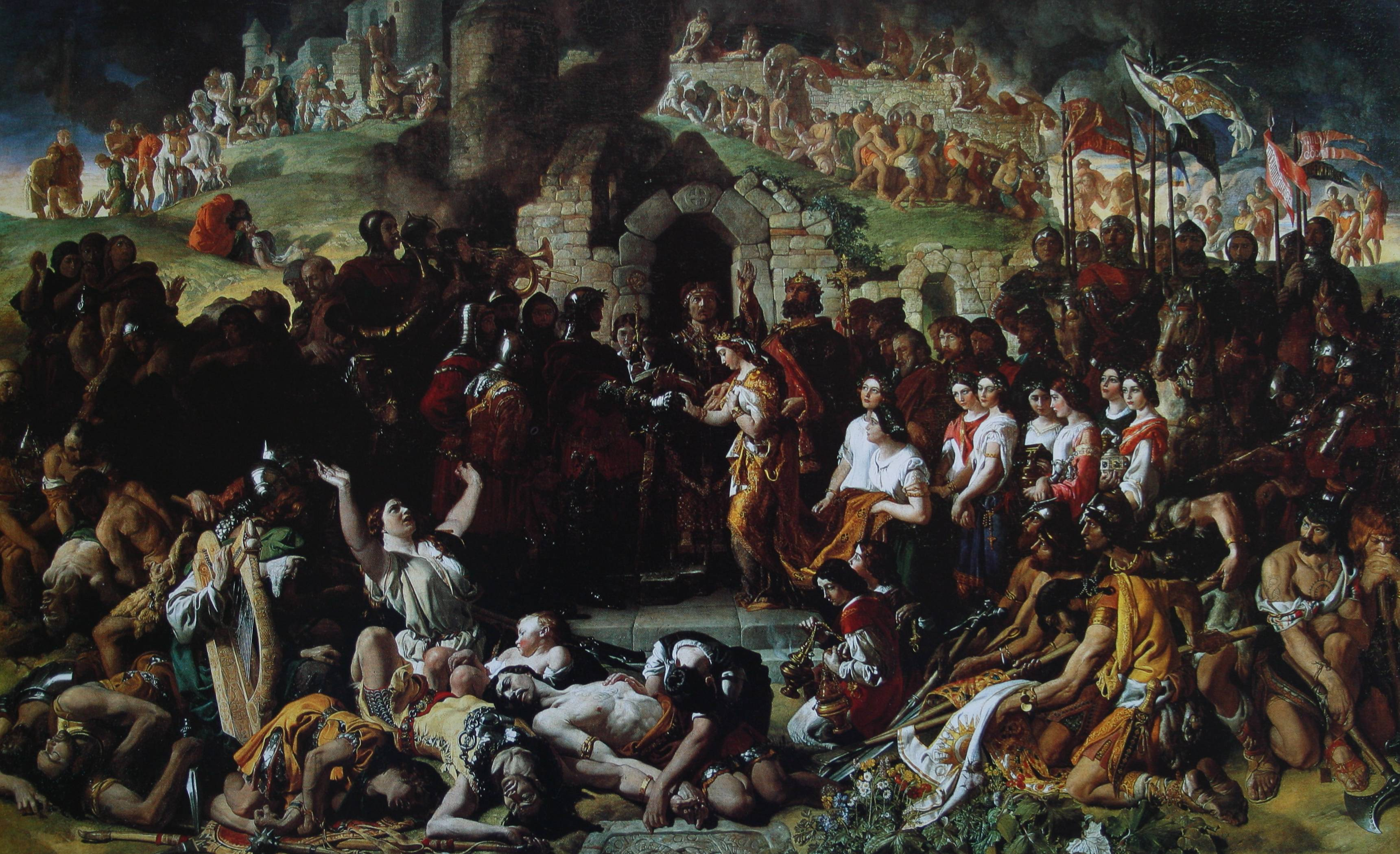
The Marriage of Strongbow and Aoife, 1854

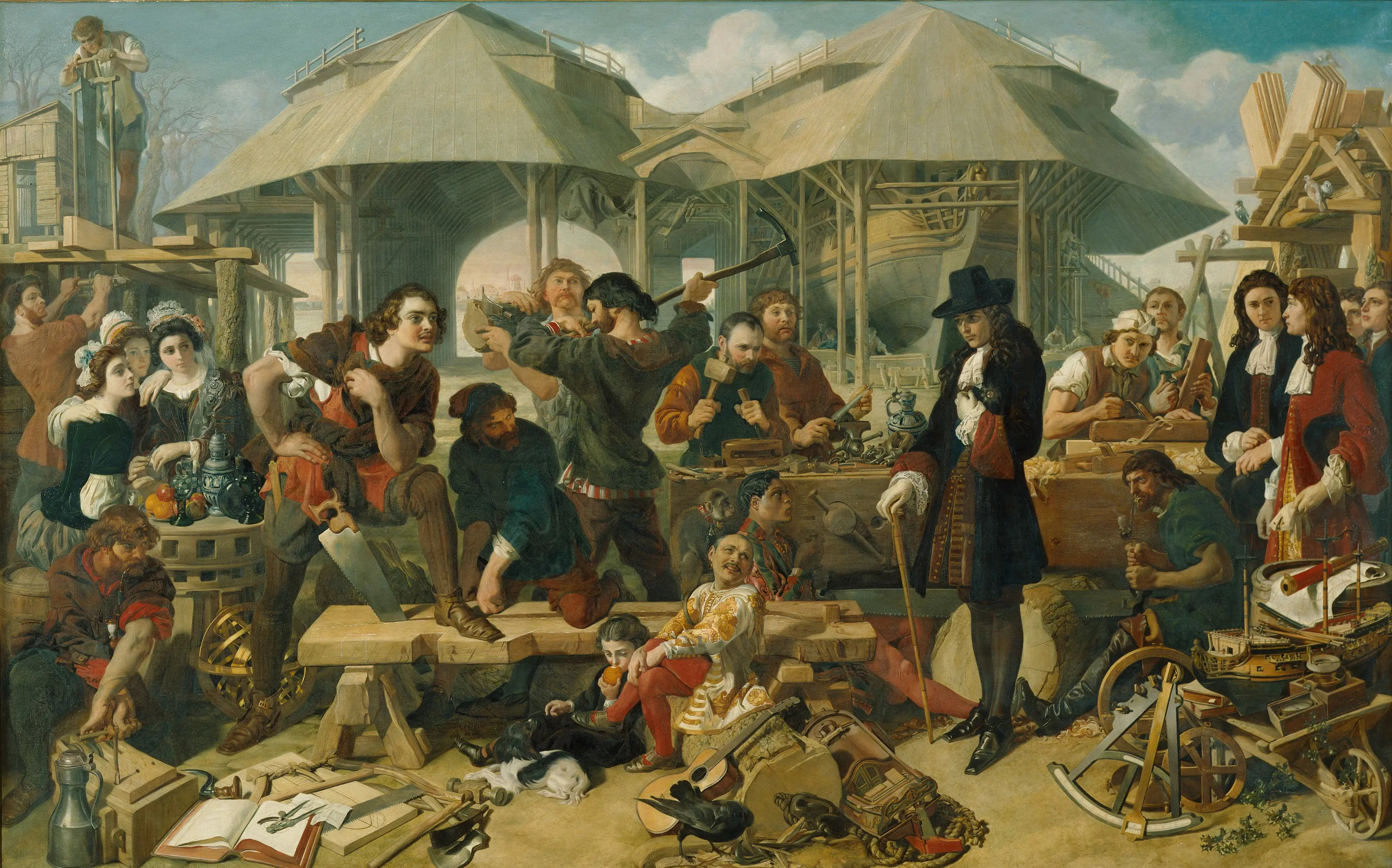
Peter the Great at Deptford Dockyard, 1857

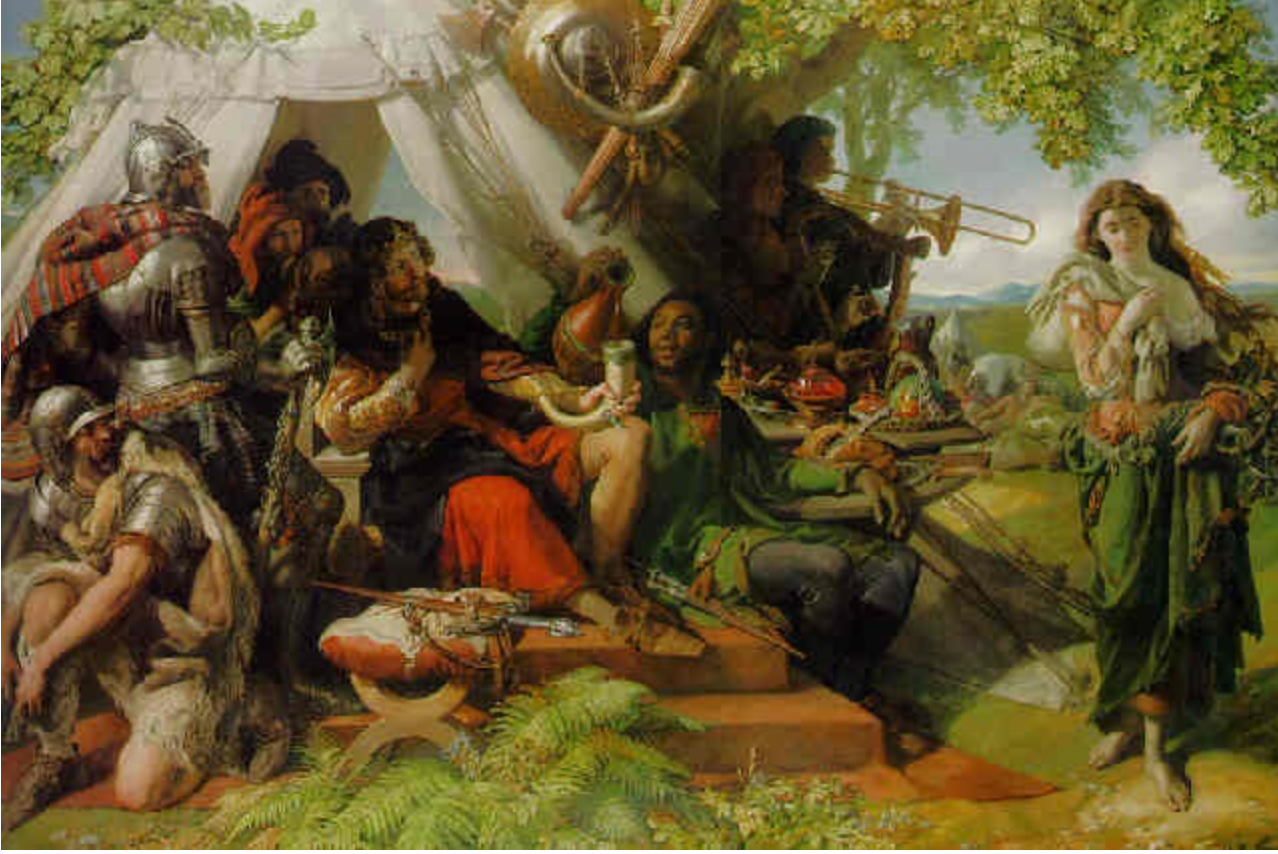
King Cophetua and the Beggar Maid, 1869
