= 1834 in art =

Events from the year 1834 in art.

== Events ==
- May 5 – The Royal Academy Exhibition of 1834 opens at Somerset House in London
- October 16 – The destruction by fire of the Houses of Parliament in London, UK, is witnessed by J. M. W. Turner, John Constable and Augustus Pugin, all of whose artistic careers will be influenced by the event.

== Works ==
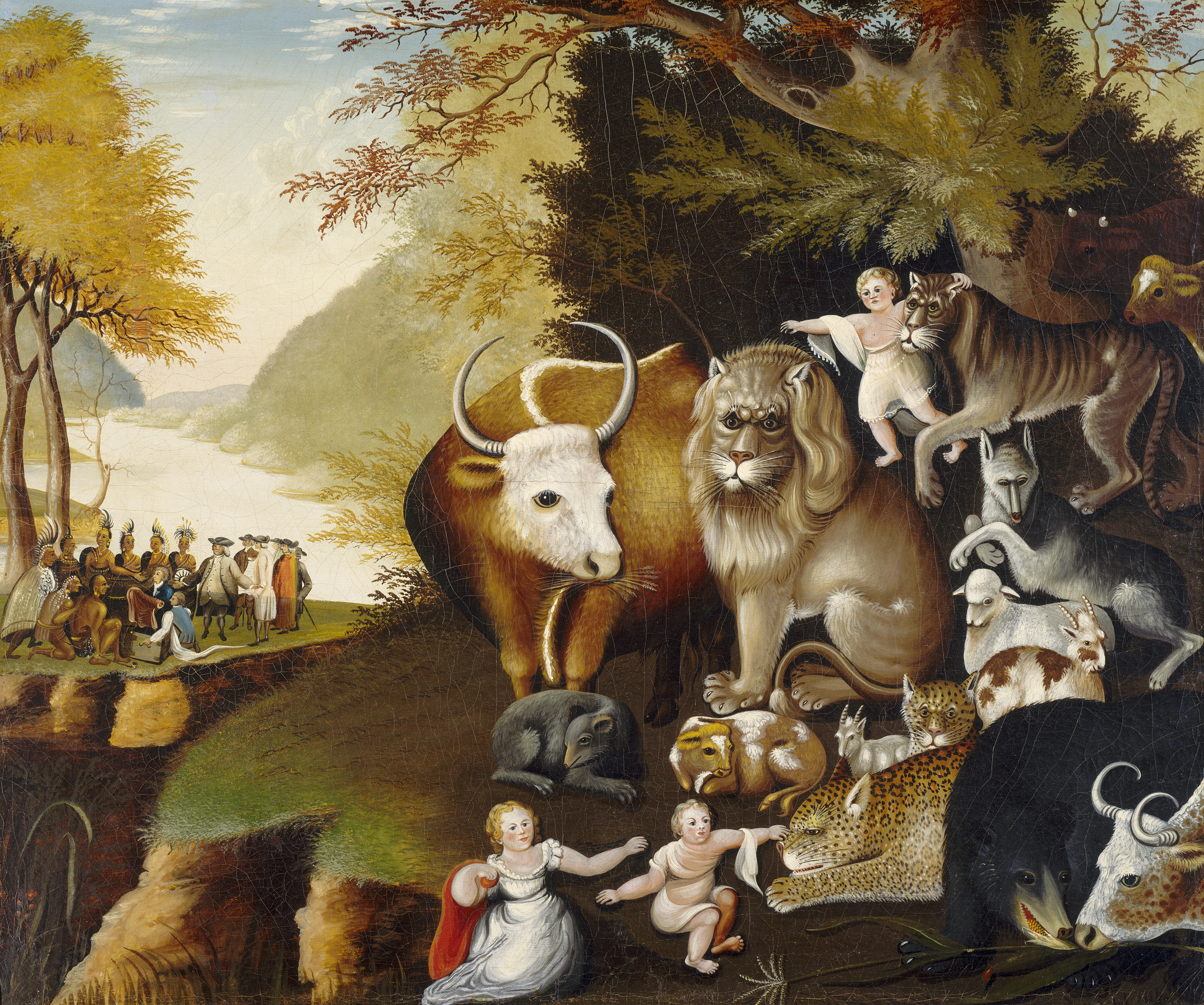
Edward Hicks, The Peaceable Kingdom (c. 1834)

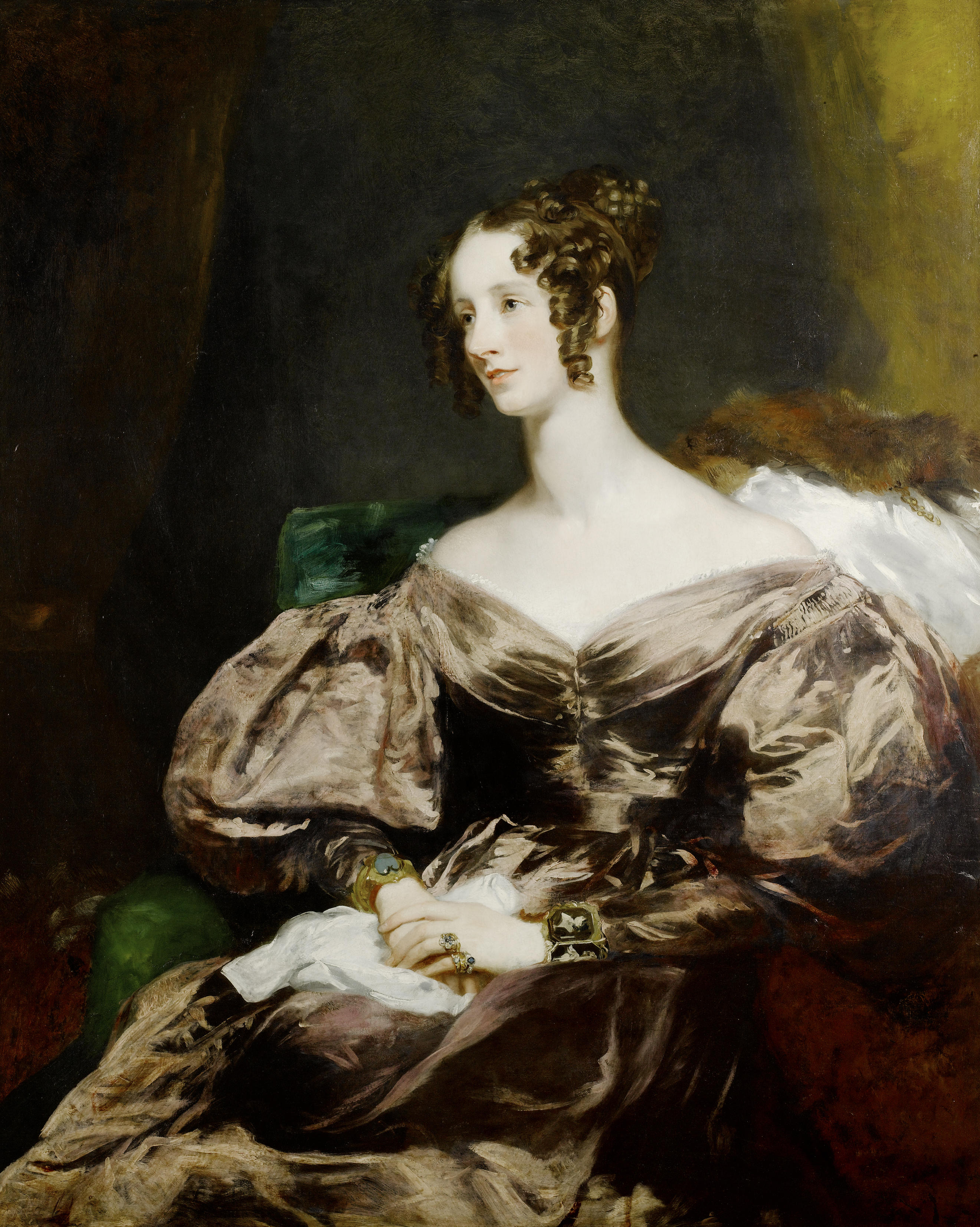
Portrait of Countess Howe by Margaret Sarah Carpenter

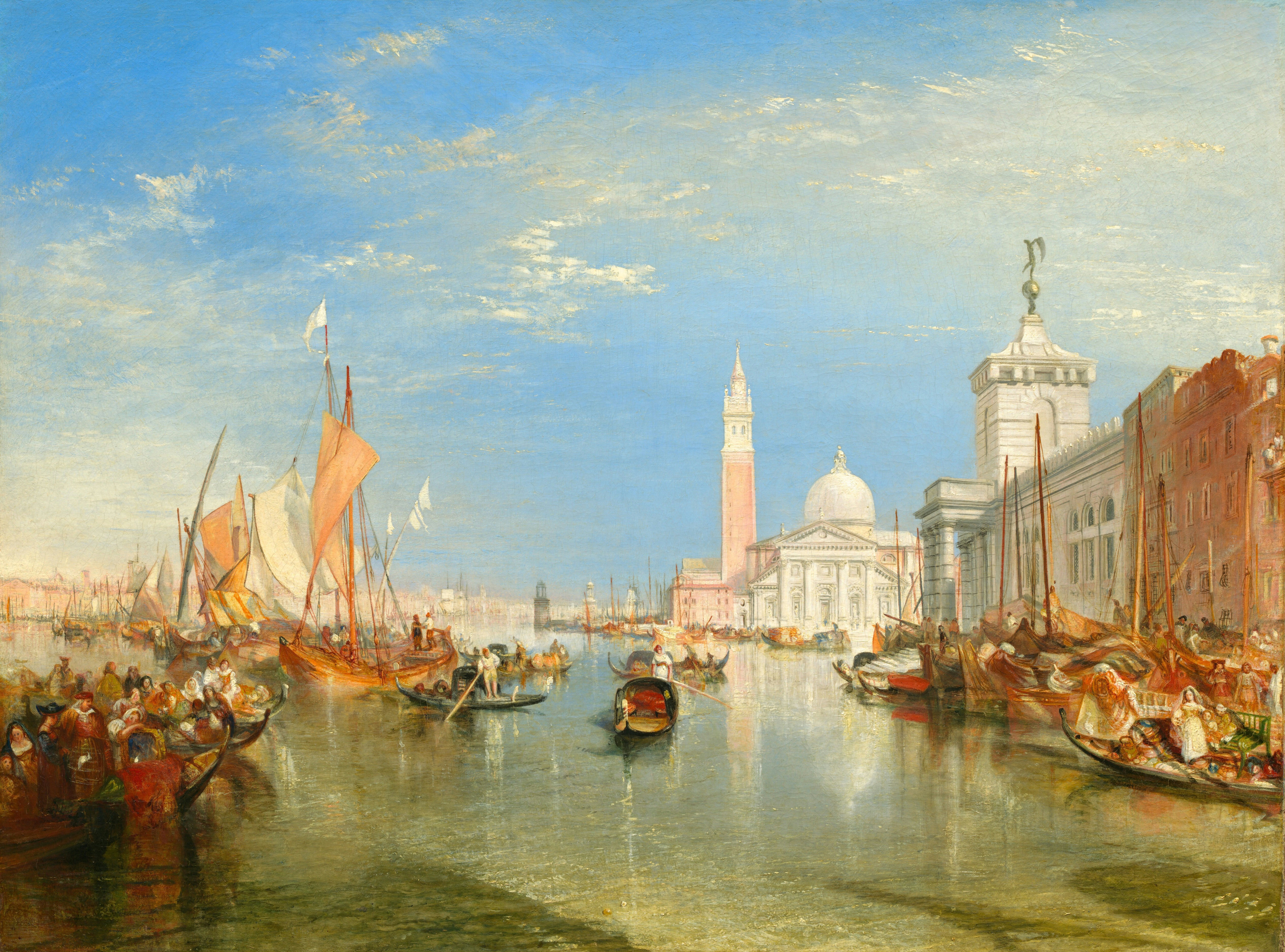
Venice: The Dogana and San Giorgio Maggiore by Turner

=== Paintings ===
- William Allan – The Orphan
- Carl Blechen – The Interior of the Palm House on the Pfaueninsel Near Potsdam
- Margaret Sarah Carpenter – Portrait of Countess Howe
- Léon Cogniet – The National Guard of Paris Departs for the Army
- Thomas Cole – The Savage State and The Arcadian or Pastoral State from The Course of Empire
- John Constable – Old Sarum
- Jean-Baptiste-Camille Corot – Forest of Fontainebleau
- Eugène Delacroix
  - The Prisoner of Chillon
  - The Women of Algiers
- François Gérard – Portrait of Louis Philippe I
- Benjamin Robert Haydon – The Reform Banquet
- Francesco Hayez – Bathsheba at Her Bath
- François Joseph Heim – The Chamber of Deputies Received at the Palais-Royal by the Duke of Orleans
- Edward Hicks – Peaceable Kingdom
- William Hilton – Marc Antony Reading the Will of Caesar
- Jean Auguste Dominique Ingres
  - The Martyrdom of Saint Symphorian (Autun Cathedral)
  - Portrait of Louis-Mathieu Molé
- Edwin Landseer
  - Bolton Abbey in the Olden Time
  - A Highland Breakfast
  - Suspense
- Thomas Luny – Battle of the Nile, August 1st 1798 at 10 pm
- Daniel Maclise –
  - The Installation of Captain Rock
  - Portrait of William Harrison Ainsworth
- John Martin – The Deluge
- Thomas Phillips – Portrait of Mary Somerville
- David Roberts – Old Buildings on the Darro, Granada
- J. M. W. Turner
  - The Fountain of Indolence
  - Venice: The Dogana and San Giorgio Maggiore
  - Wreckers, Coast of Northumberland
- David Wilkie – Christopher Columbus Explaining His Intended Voyage

=== Prints ===
- Hiroshige – The Sixty-nine Stations of the Kiso Kaidō (publication begins)
- Hokusai – One Hundred Views of Mount Fuji

=== Sculptures ===
- Francis Chantrey – Memorial to Mary Anne Boulton (Great Tew church, Oxfordshire)
- Antoine-Augustin Préault – The Killing (Musée des Beaux-Arts, Chartres)

== Births ==
- February 15 – Paul Guigou, French painter (died 1871)
- February 28 – Léon Bonvin, French painter and watercolorist (died 1866)
- May 9 – Alexander Calandrelli, German sculptor (died 1903)
- July 4 – Christopher Dresser, British designer influential in the Anglo-Japanese style (died 1904)
- July 6 – Joseph Boehm, Austrian-born sculptor (died 1890)
- July 10 – James McNeill Whistler, American-born painter (died 1903)
- July 19 – Edgar Degas, French painter and sculptor (died 1917)
- August 2 – Frédéric Bartholdi, French sculptor of the Statue of Liberty (died 1904)
- December 9 – Leopold Müller, German-born Austrian painter (died 1892)
- date unknown
  - Caspar Buberl, American sculptor (died 1899)
  - Percy Hetherington Fitzgerald, Irish-born literary biographer, drama critic and sculptor (died 1925)

== Deaths ==
- January 4 – Mauro Gandolfi, Italian painter and engraver of the Bolognese School (born 1764)
- January 31 – Zacarías González Velázquez, Spanish painter (born 1763)
- February 26 – Alois Senefelder, German actor, playwright and inventor of lithography (born 1771)
- March 30 – Rudolph Ackermann, German-born printer and lithographer (born 1764)
- March 31 – Landolin Ohmacht, German sculptor (born 1760)
- April 27 – Thomas Stothard, English painter and engraver (born 1755)
- May 1 – Samuel Elmgren, Finnish painter (born 1771)
- June 4 – Robert Bowyer, English miniature painter and publisher (born 1758)
- August 7 – William Birch, English miniature painter and engraver (born 1755)
- c. August 13 – Peter Rindisbacher, Swiss-born painter in the United States (born 1806)
- October 11 – Ulrika Melin, textile artist, member of the Royal Swedish Academy of Art (born 1767)
- December 3 – Ferdinand Runk, German-Austrian landscape painter, draftsman and etcher (born 1764)
- December 17 – Henry Bone, English enamel painter (born 1755)
- December 22 – Prince Hoare, English painter and dramatist (born 1755)
- date unknown
  - Vicente Escobar, Cuban painter (born 1757)
  - Anne Forbes, Scottish portrait painter (born 1745)
