= Pfaueninsel =

Island in the River Havel in Berlin, Germany

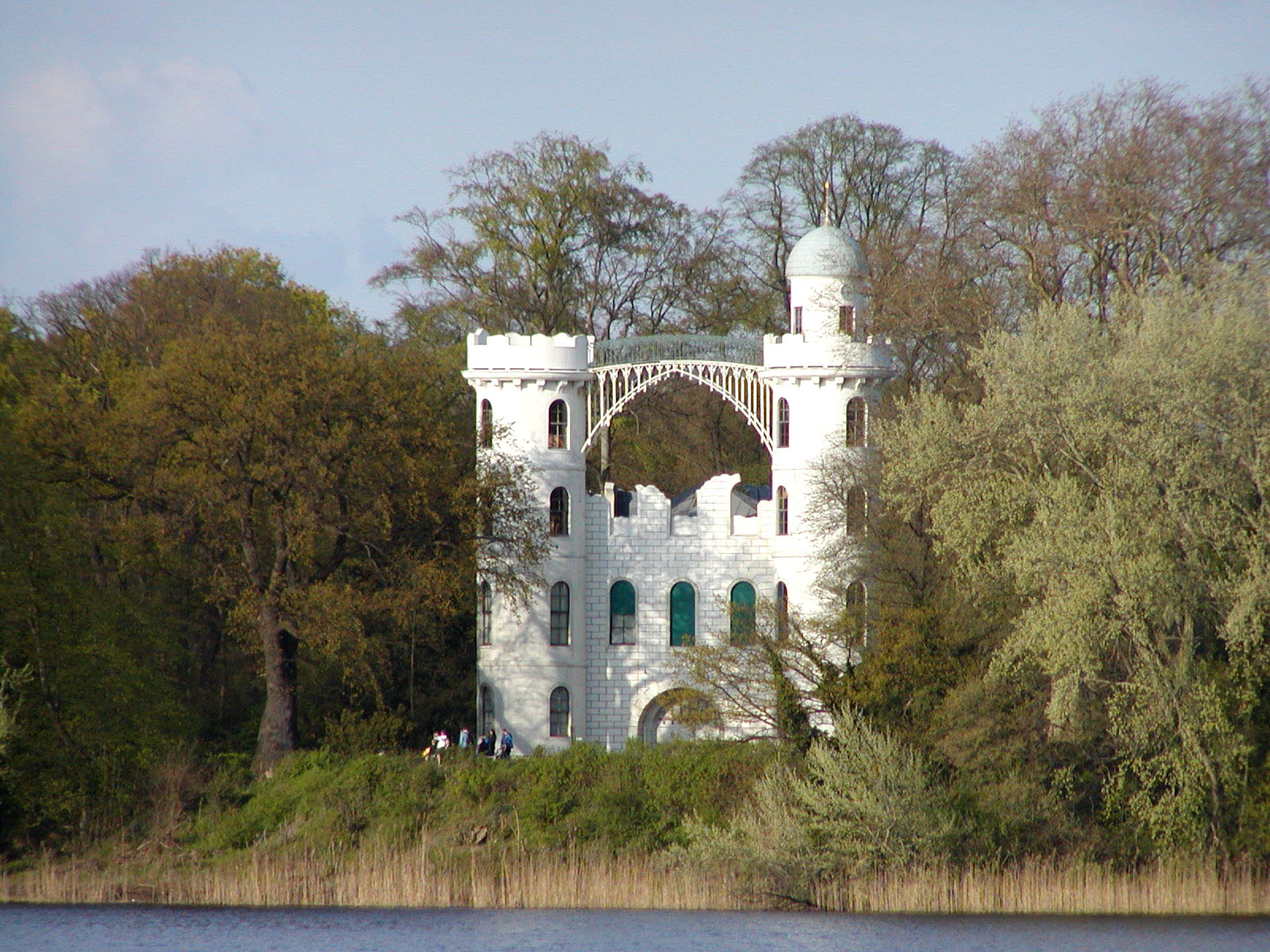
- View of the Castle from the Havel.

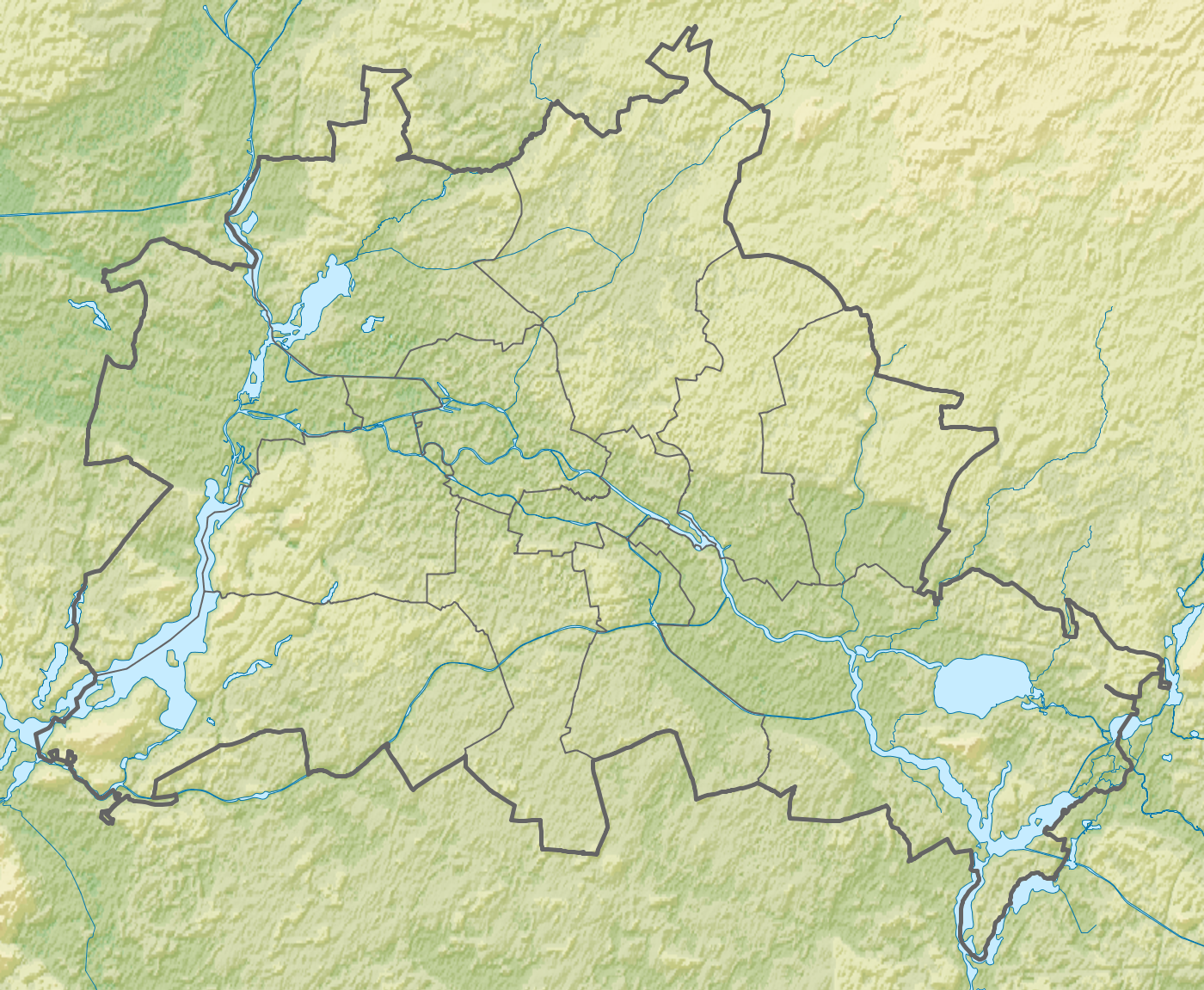
- Location within Germany Location within Berlin
- Location: Berlin
- Coordinates: 52°26′4″N 13°7′51″E
- Area: 67 ha (170 acres)
- Established: originally in 1924
- Governing body: Stiftung Preußische Schlösser und Gärten Berlin-Brandenburg (SPSG)
- World Heritage site: Palaces and Parks of Potsdam and Berlin
- Website: www.spsg.de/en/palaces-gardens/object/peacock-island/

Pfaueninsel ("Peacock Island") is an island in the River Havel situated in Berlin-Wannsee, in the district of Steglitz-Zehlendorf in southwestern Berlin, near the border with Potsdam in Brandenburg. The island is part of the Palaces and Parks of Potsdam and Berlin UNESCO World Heritage Site because of its outstanding Prussian architecture and is a popular destination for day-trippers. Pfaueninsel is also a nature reserve in accordance with the EU Habitats Directive and a Special Protection Area for wild birds.

== Geography ==
Pfaueninsel is an island of 67 hectares (170 acres) in the river Havel, situated between Kladow to the west and Wannsee to the east and downriver from the Großer Wannsee, in Berlin, Germany. Further downstream is the Jungfernsee. The island is mostly woodland with some open areas, including lawns and fields. The total size of the protected area, including some water-covered areas, is 98 hectares (240 acres).

== History ==
In the late 17th century the island was called Kaninchenwerder ("Rabbit Island") after a rabbit breeding station set up by Elector Frederick William I of Brandenburg of the Hohenzollern dynasty. From 1685, he gave the chemist Johann Kunckel financial aid to build a glass foundry in the east of the island, the whole of which became Kunckel's property. Here Kunckel discovered a process to produce artificial ruby (red) glass. After the elector's death in 1688, however, Kunckel gained no further support from Frederick William's heir. In 1689, the foundry was destroyed by a fire (possibly caused by arson), and Kunckel left in 1692 for Stockholm to work for the King of Sweden.

The island remained unused for about 100 years until, in 1793, the Prussian king Frederick William II, a descendant of Frederick William I, acquired the island and had the Pfaueninsel castle built for himself and his mistress Wilhelmine Enke in 1794–97. The small Lustschloss was placed on the western tip of the island, visible from the king's residence at the Marmorpalais in Potsdam. It was designed as a summer residence for the King by Johann Gottlieb Brendel. Around it an English garden was created, including a dairy shaped like a gothic revival church on the other end of the island. One of the garden designers was Johann August Eyserbeck who died in 1801. In 1804, Ferdinand Fintelmann took over as royal gardener.

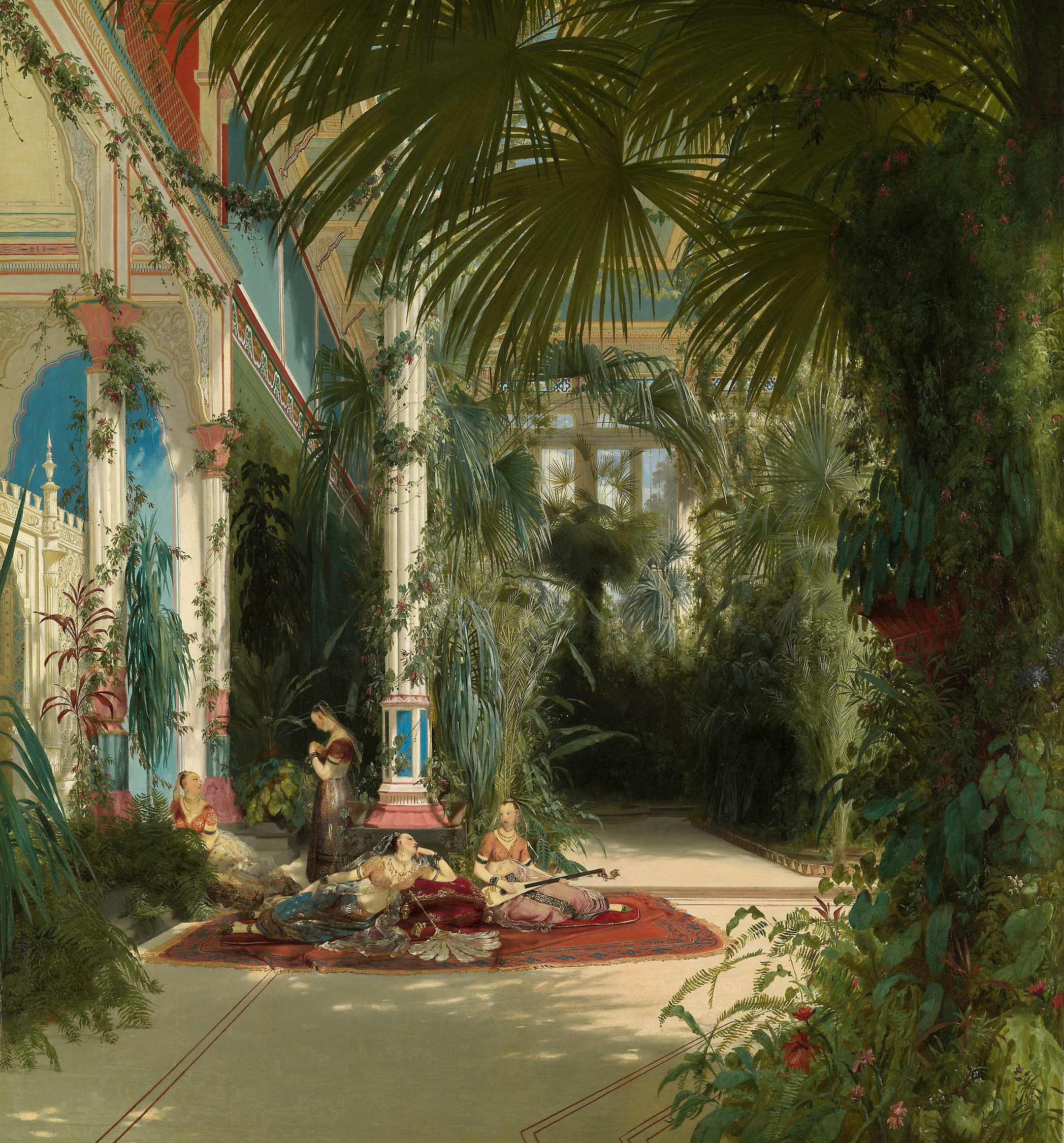
The House of Palms as depicted in The Interior of the Palm House on the Pfaueninsel Near Potsdam by Carl Blechen (1834)

Frederick William's successor, Frederick William III, turned the island into a model farm and in 1821–34 had the park redesigned by Peter Joseph Lenné and Karl Friedrich Schinkel, who planned several auxiliary buildings. The king also laid out a menagerie modelled on the Ménagerie du Jardin des Plantes in Paris, in which exotic animals including alligators, buffalos, kangaroos, monkeys, chameleons, wolves, eagles, lions, lamas, bears, beavers and peacocks were housed. This initially stretched between the castle and the Kavaliershaus, but was altered by Lenné in 1824. Buildings were designed in the Italian villa style and included grottos and an aviary (which still remains today). The number of animals peaked at over 900, from over 100 species. Frederick William III was very fond of his animals, often feeding many of them personally. He also made his collection accessible to the people of Berlin. However, this created such an onslaught on the small island, that from 1821 the public was allowed on the island only three days a week. Nevertheless, public interest remained so high that the special trains running from Berlin were often overcrowded. In 1830 Harry Maitey, the first native Hawaiian who came to Prussia, was assigned as assistant to the engine master on the island. In 1842, Frederick William IV transferred all the animals to the Berlin Zoo, which opened its gates in 1844 as the first of its kind in Germany.

The Palmenhaus ("House of Palms") was erected in 1831, based on a design by Schinkel. It housed exotic plants like tobacco, canna lilies, mangold, bananas, artichokes and rhubarb and was praised by explorer Alexander von Humboldt. It caught fire for unknown reasons in the night of 19/20 May 1880 and burnt to the ground. It was suggested that the fire was due to a stray spark from the chimney, as the Palmenhaus had been built out of wood. It was not rebuilt, but stone columns still trace the outline of the building.

On 15 August 1936, the German government celebrated the closing of the 1936 Olympic Summer Games on the island, with fireworks and an Italian Night party involving a thousand invited guests.

In the post-World War II period, the Pfaueninsel was part of West Berlin. It was situated right next to the border to East Germany. On the shore of Sacrow to the north and west were the Grenzsicherungsanlagen (fortifications of the inner German border) of the German Democratic Republic.

In the 1960s, the Pfaueninsel served as an outdoor location for a number of films of the German Edgar Wallace series.

== Today ==
The island has largely retained its intended character as an idyll of nature: in addition to several free-ranging peacocks, other native and exotic birds can be found in captivity, complemented by a rich variety of flora. The entire island is designated as a nature reserve and since 1990 has been a UNESCO World Heritage Site, along with the several other castles and parks in the Potsdam/Berlin area. It can only be reached by a small ferry but is a popular tourist destination. It is administered by the Stiftung Preußische Schlösser und Gärten (SPSG).

== Gallery ==
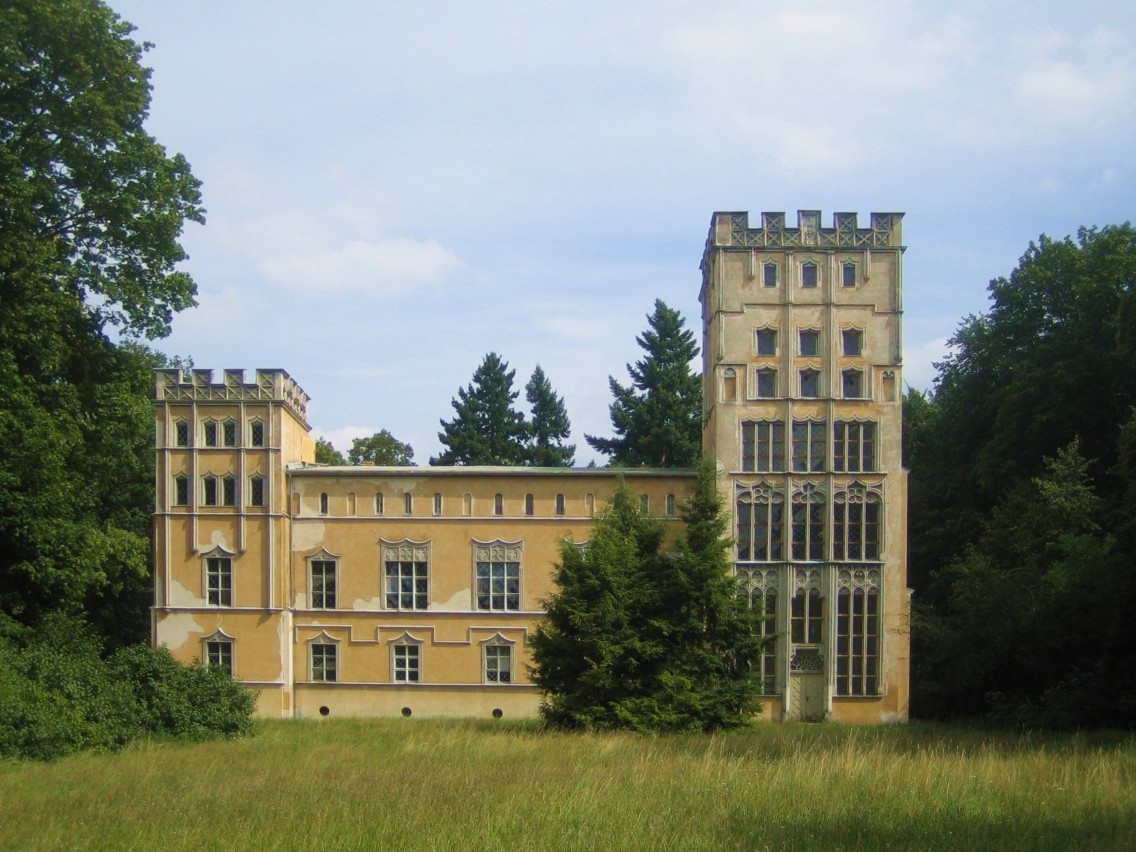
The so-called Kavaliershaus (house of cavaliers)

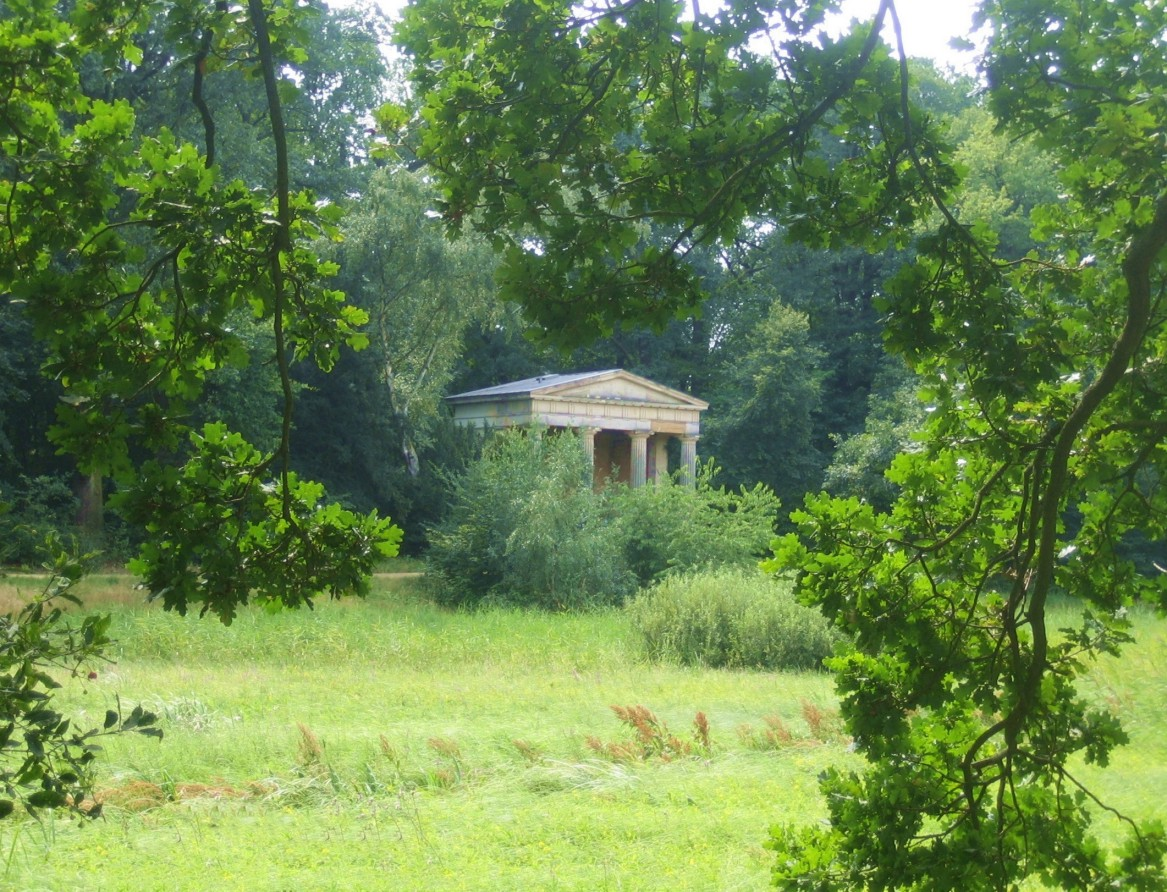
Memorial temple for Queen Luise of Prussia, built 1829

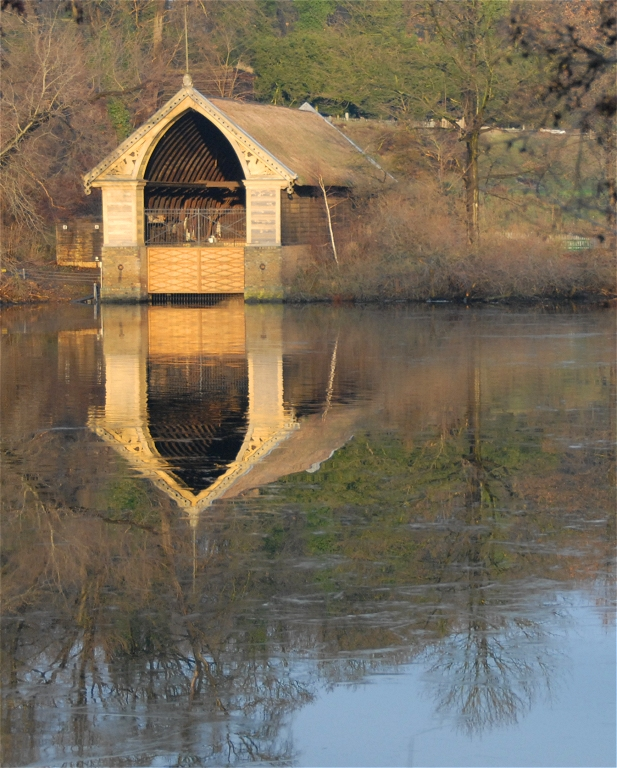
Frigate Shelter, built 1833 for the Royal Louise, a miniature frigate

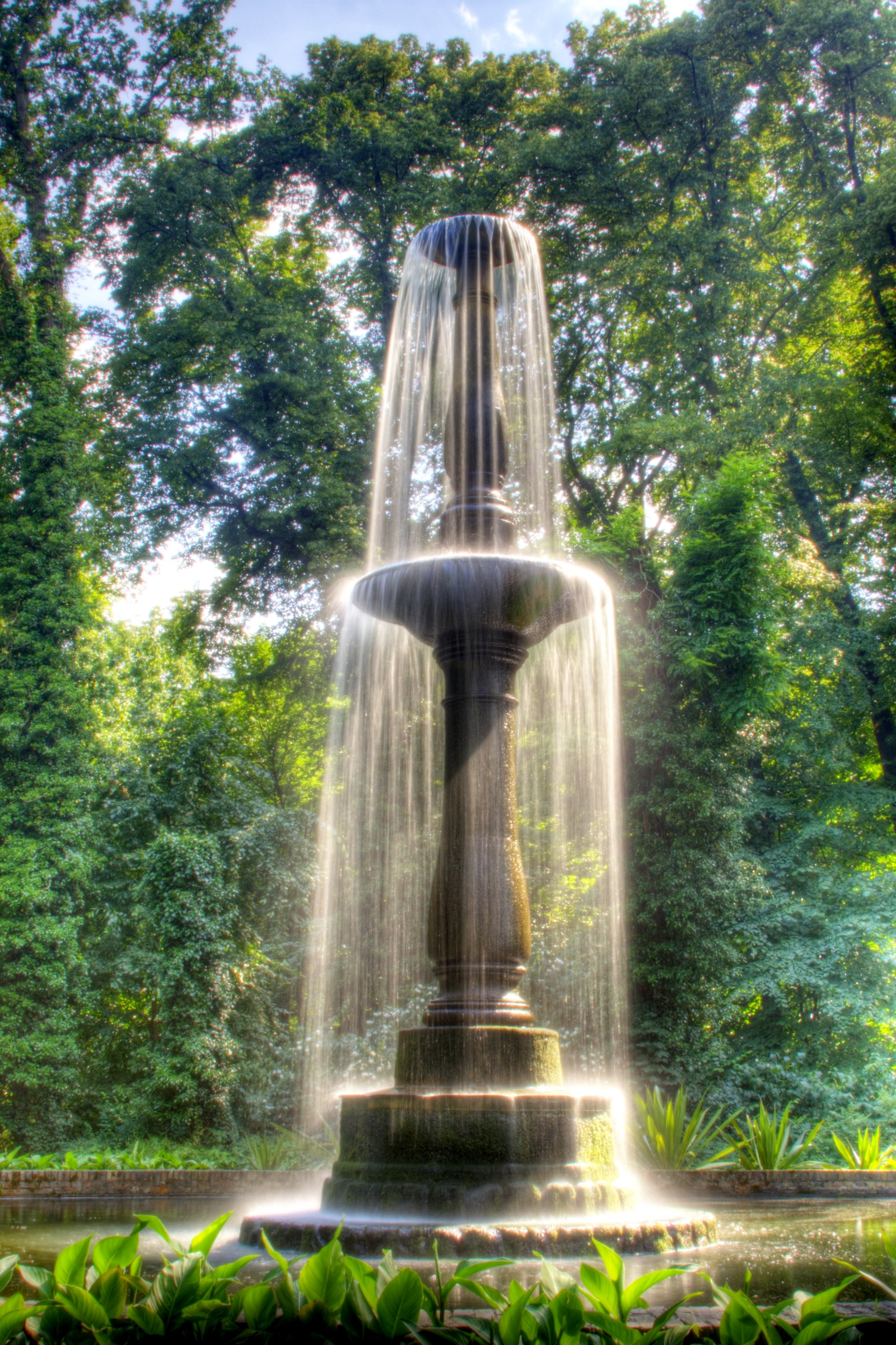
Column fountain, created in 1824 by Martin Friedrich Rabe

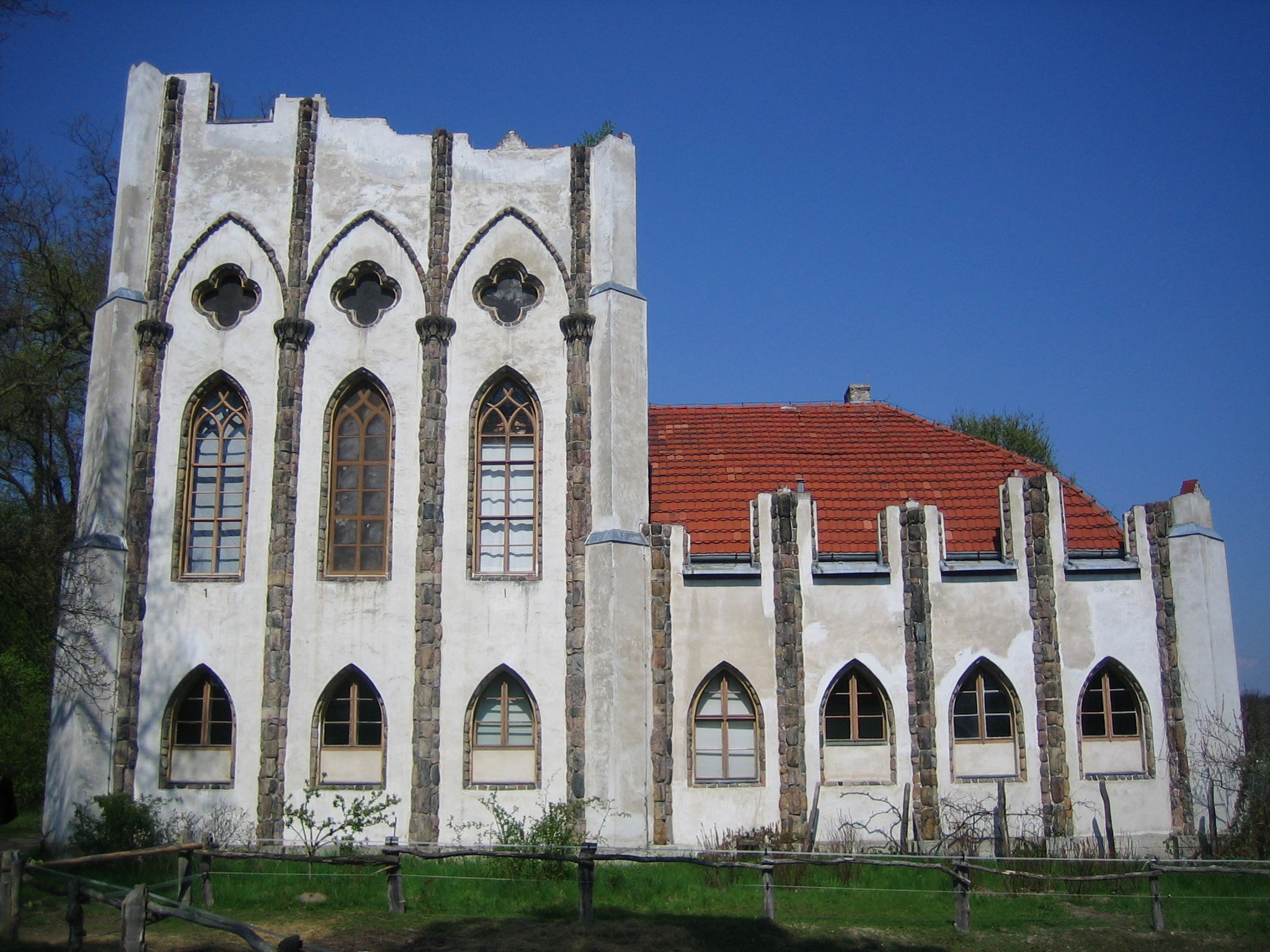
Meierei (dairy), view from the southeast

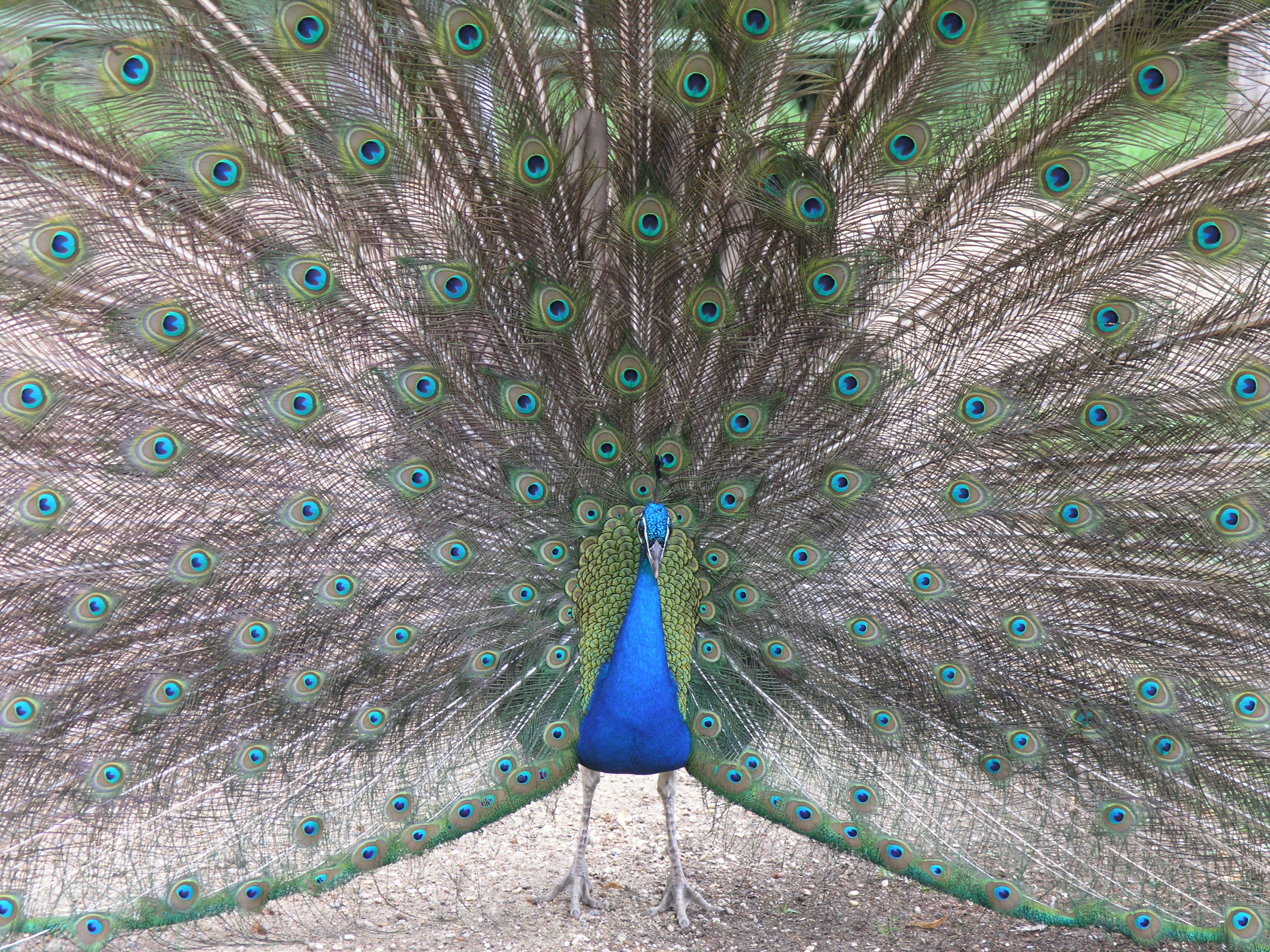
Peacock on Pfaueninsel
