= Suspense (disambiguation) =

Suspense is a feeling of uncertainty and anxiety about the outcome of certain actions.

Suspense may also refer to:

- Suspense (1913 film), a silent film
- Suspense (1930 film), a film directed by Walter Summers
- Suspense (1946 film), a film starring Barry Sullivan
- Suspense (radio drama), an American radio anthology series
- Suspense (American TV series), an American television anthology series
- Suspense (British TV series), a British television anthology series
- Suspense (painting), an 1834 painting by Edwin Landseer
- Suspense (album), a 1984 album by Pink Lady
- Suspense Digest, an Urdu magazine in Pakistan

== See also ==
- Suspense account, a type of temporary account in accounting
- Suspension (disambiguation)
- Thriller (genre)
