= Portrait of Louis Philippe I (Winterhalter) =

Painting by Franz Xaver Winterhalter

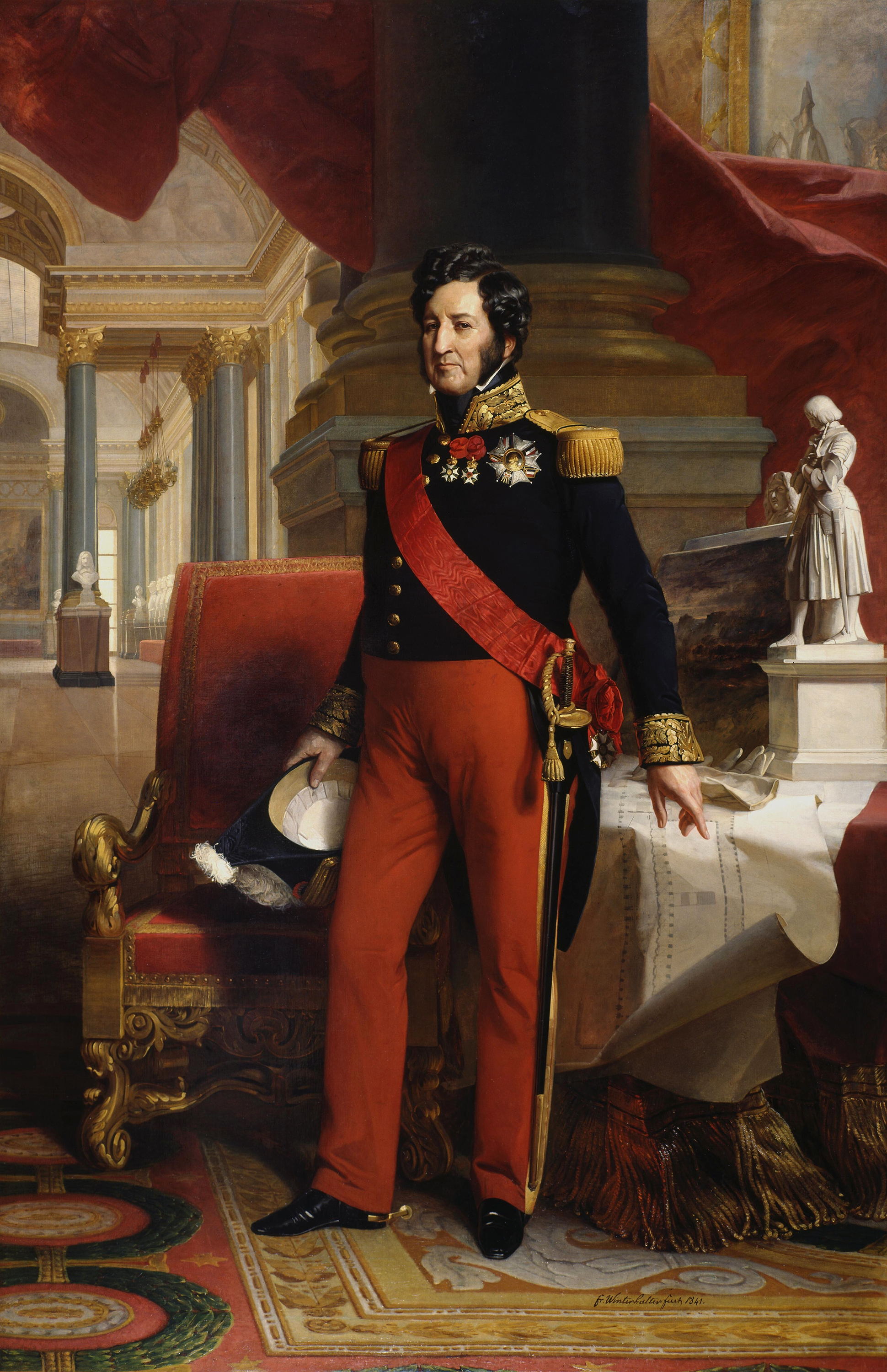
- Artist: Franz Xaver Winterhalter
- Year: 1841
- Type: Oil on canvas, portrait painting
- Dimensions: 283 cm × 182 cm (111 in × 72 in)
- Location: Palace of Versailles, Versailles

Portrait of Louis Philippe I is an 1841 portrait painting by the German artist Franz Xaver Winterhalter depicting the French monarch Louis Philippe I. Winterhalter was rapidly emerging as one of the most fashionable portrait painters in Europe and had numerous royal sitters that year alone.

His painting of Louis Philippe was a celebration of the king's role in the restoration and reopening of the Palace of Versailles as a Museum of French History. He is shown in the uniform of a major general with the Galerie des Batailles behind him. His hand rests on the architectural plans for the gallery and nearby is a statuette of Joan of Arc created by his daughter Princess Marie. Today the painting is in collection of Versailles having been acquired in 1975. It recreates the pose from an earlier portrait by Winterhalter with a different background.

== See also ==
- Portrait of Louis Philippe I (Gérard), an 1834 painting by François Gérard

== Bibliography ==
- Astell, Ann W. & Wheeler, Bonnie. Joan of Arc and Spirituality. Springer, 2016. ISBN 1403962227.
- Galitz, Kathryn Calley. Masterpieces of European Painting, 1800-1920, in the Metropolitan Museum of Art. Metropolitan Museum of Art, 2007. ISBN 0847846598.
- Hensel, Tina. Das Bild der Herrscherin: Franz Xaver Winterhalter und die Gattungspolitik des Porträts im 19. Jahrhundert. Walter de Gruyter, 2023. ISBN 3111084876.
