= Keelmen Heaving in Coals by Moonlight =

Painting by J. M. W. Turner

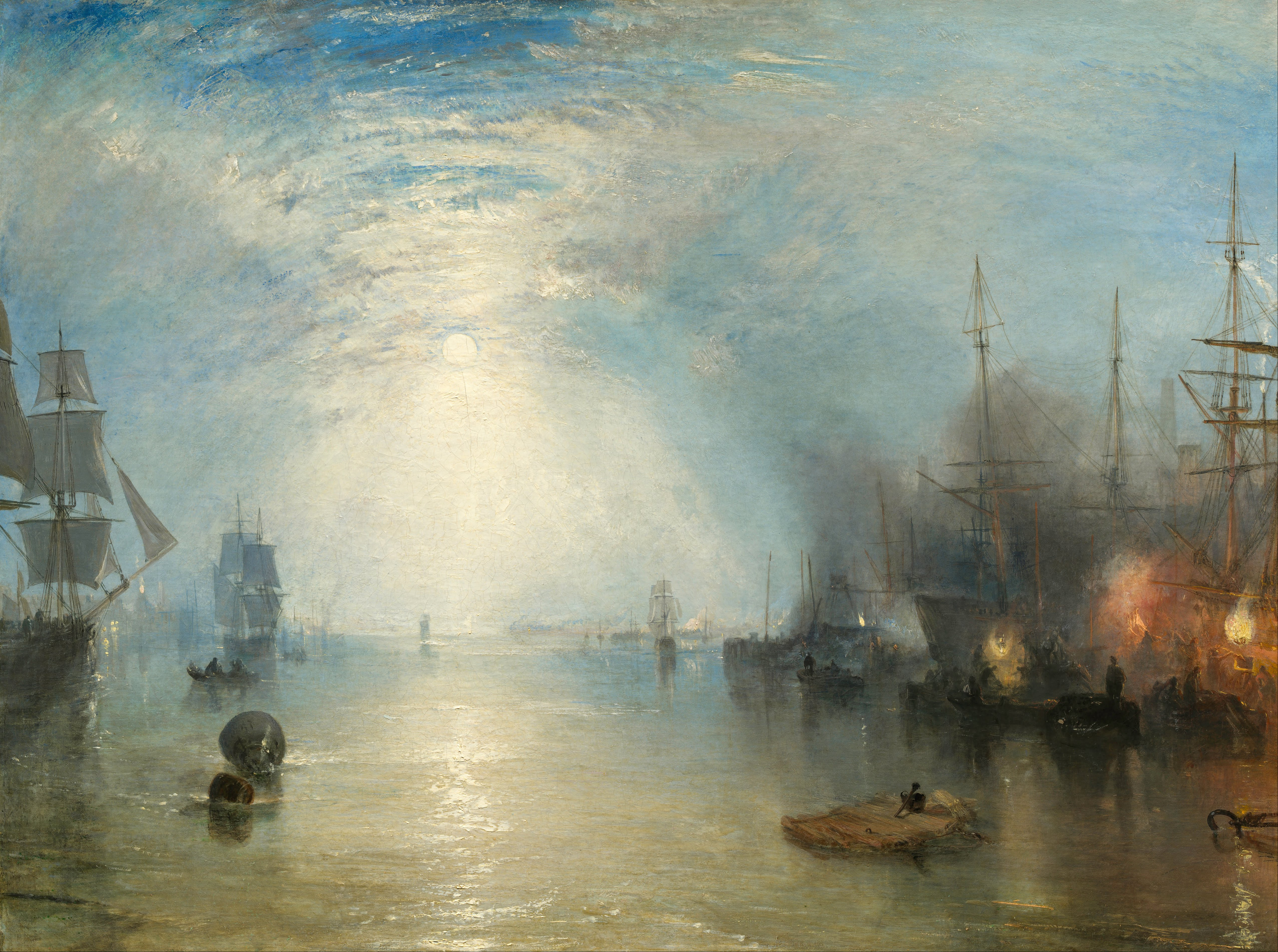
- Artist: J. M. W. Turner
- Year: 1835
- Type: Oil on canvas, seascape painting
- Dimensions: 92.3 cm × 122.8 cm (36.33 in × 48.34 in)
- Location: National Gallery of Art, Washington

Keelmen Heaving in Coals by Moonlight is an 1835 seascape painting by the British artist J.M.W. Turner. It is set at the port of Newcastle upon Tyne in the North East of England. Keelmen are unloading coal from the flat-bottomed boats that has brought it up the Tyne River to the ships that will carry it on its onwards journey. The scene is illuminated by a flood of moonlight and the blazing torches of the keelmen .

It was commissioned by the Manchester textile manufacturer. Henry McConnell as a companion piece by another work of Turner's featuring Venice The Dogana and San Giorgio Maggiore. The painting was displayed at the Royal Academy's Summer Exhibition of 1835 at Somerset House. Today it is in the collection of the National Gallery of Art in Washington D.C.. In 2025 it was lent to the Tate Britain for the exhibition Turner and Constable: Rivals and Originals.

== See also ==
- List of paintings by J. M. W. Turner

== Bibliography ==
- Bailey, Anthony. J.M.W. Turner: Standing in the Sun. Tate Enterprises Ltd, 2013.
- Hamilton, James. Turner - A Life. Sceptre, 1998.
