= Old Buildings on the Darro, Granada =

Painting by David Roberts

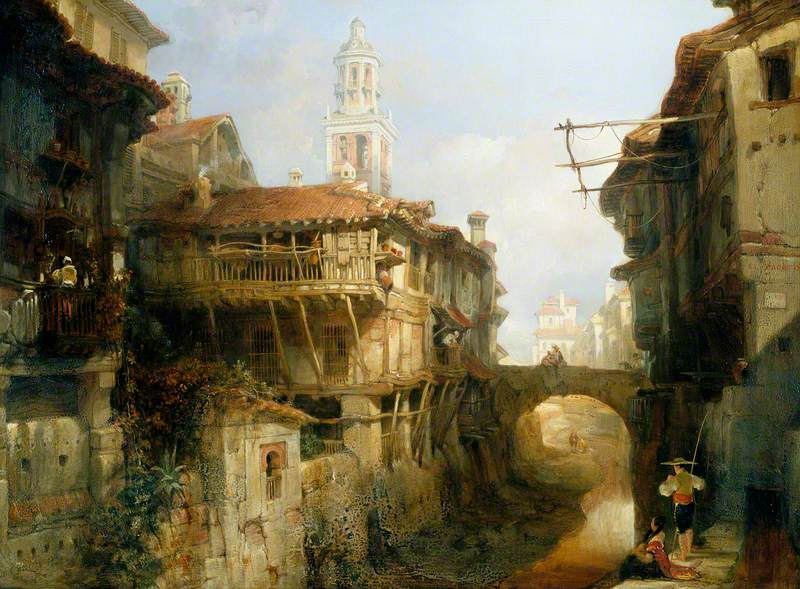
- Artist: David Roberts
- Year: 1834
- Type: Oil on panel, landscape painting
- Dimensions: 44.4 cm × 59.4 cm (17.5 in × 23.4 in)
- Location: Victoria and Albert Museum; London

Old Buildings on the Darro, Granada is an 1834 oil painting by the British artist David Roberts. A cityscape it features a view on the River Darro in Granada in the old Moorish medieval section of the city.

Roberts had visited Spain the previous year and spent three weeks in Granada. The work was displayed at the British Institution's annual exhibition in London in 1835 where it was described by the critic of The Athenaeum as "an exquisite thing". It was donated to the nation in 1857 by the art collector John Sheepshanks as part of the Sheepshanks Gift and is today in the Victoria and Albert Museum, in South Kensington.

== Bibliography ==
- Boone, Mary Elizabeth. Vistas de España: American Views of Art and Life in Spain, 1860–1914. Yale University Press, 2007.
- Holland, Robert. The Warm South: How the Mediterranean Shaped the British Imagination. Yale University Press, 2018.
- Sim, Katherine. David Roberts R.A., 1796–1864: A Biography. Quartet Books, 1984.
- Wright, Christopher, Gordon, Catherine May & Smith, Mary Peskett. British and Irish Paintings in Public Collections: An Index of British and Irish Oil Paintings by Artists Born Before 1870 in Public and Institutional Collections in the United Kingdom and Ireland. Yale University Press, 2006.
