= Venice: The Dogana and San Giorgio Maggiore =

Painting by J. M. W. Turner

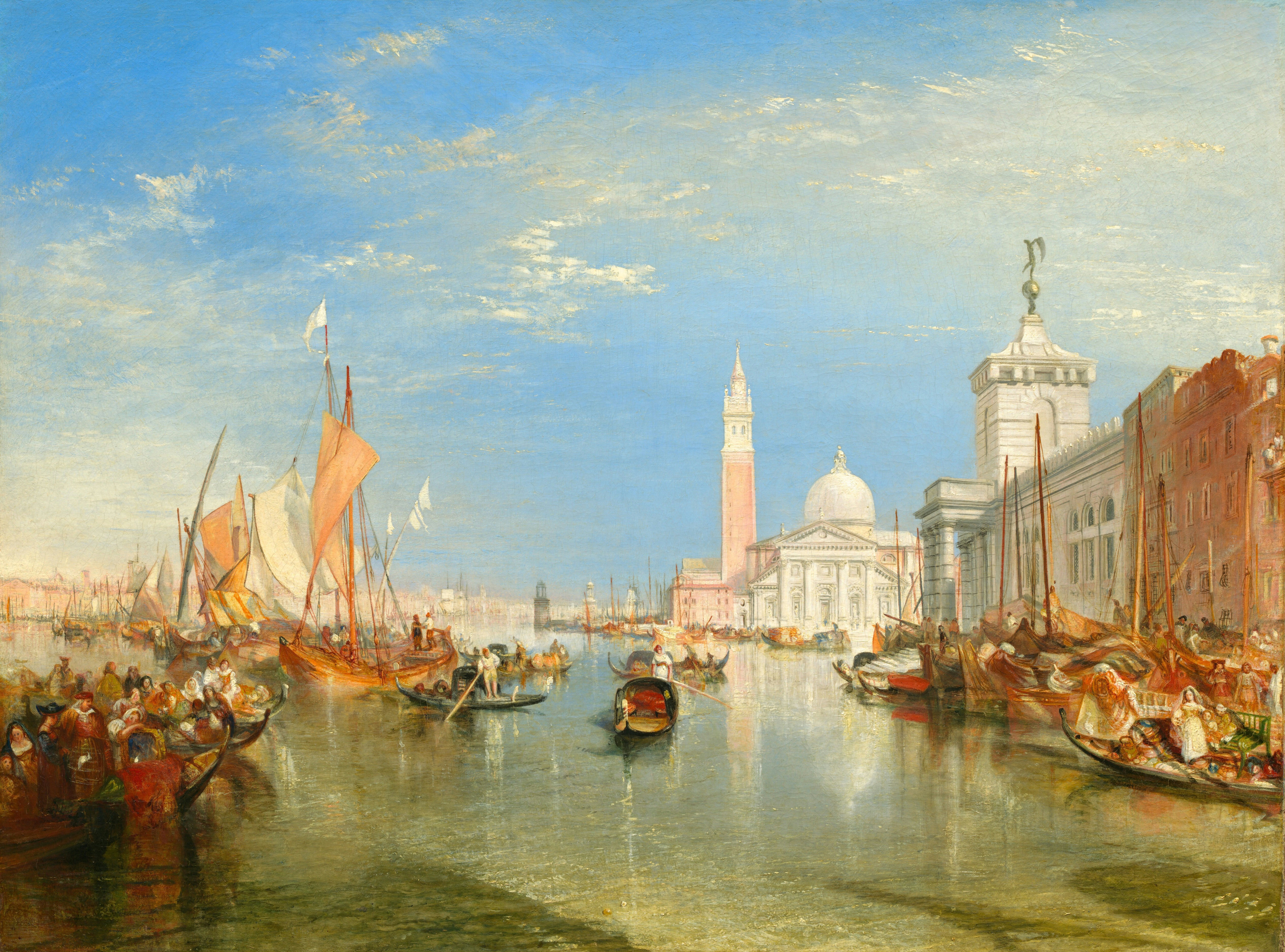
- Artist: J. M. W. Turner
- Year: 1834
- Type: Oil on canvas, landscape painting
- Dimensions: 91.5 cm × 122 cm (36.0 in × 48 in)
- Location: National Gallery of Art, Washington
- Accession: 1942.9.85

Venice: The Dogana and San Giorgio Maggiore is an 1834 landscape painting by the British artist J. M. W. Turner. It depicts a view of the Punta della Dogana, a customs house, and the San Giorgio Maggiore church in Venice. It was exhibited at the Royal Academy's Summer Exhibition in 1834. It is now in the collection of the National Gallery of Art in Washington. It was produced for the textile manufacturer for Henry McConnell, who commissioned a contrasting companion piece Keelmen Heaving in Coals by Moonlight from Turner the following year.

== See also ==
- List of paintings by J. M. W. Turner

== Bibliography ==
- Costello, Leo. J.M.W. Turner and the Subject of History. Routledge, 2017.
- Hamilton, James. Turner - A Life. Sceptre, 1998.
- Reynolds, Graham. Turner. Thames & Hudson, 2022.
