= The Interior of the Palm House on the Pfaueninsel Near Potsdam =

1834 oil painting by Carl Blechen

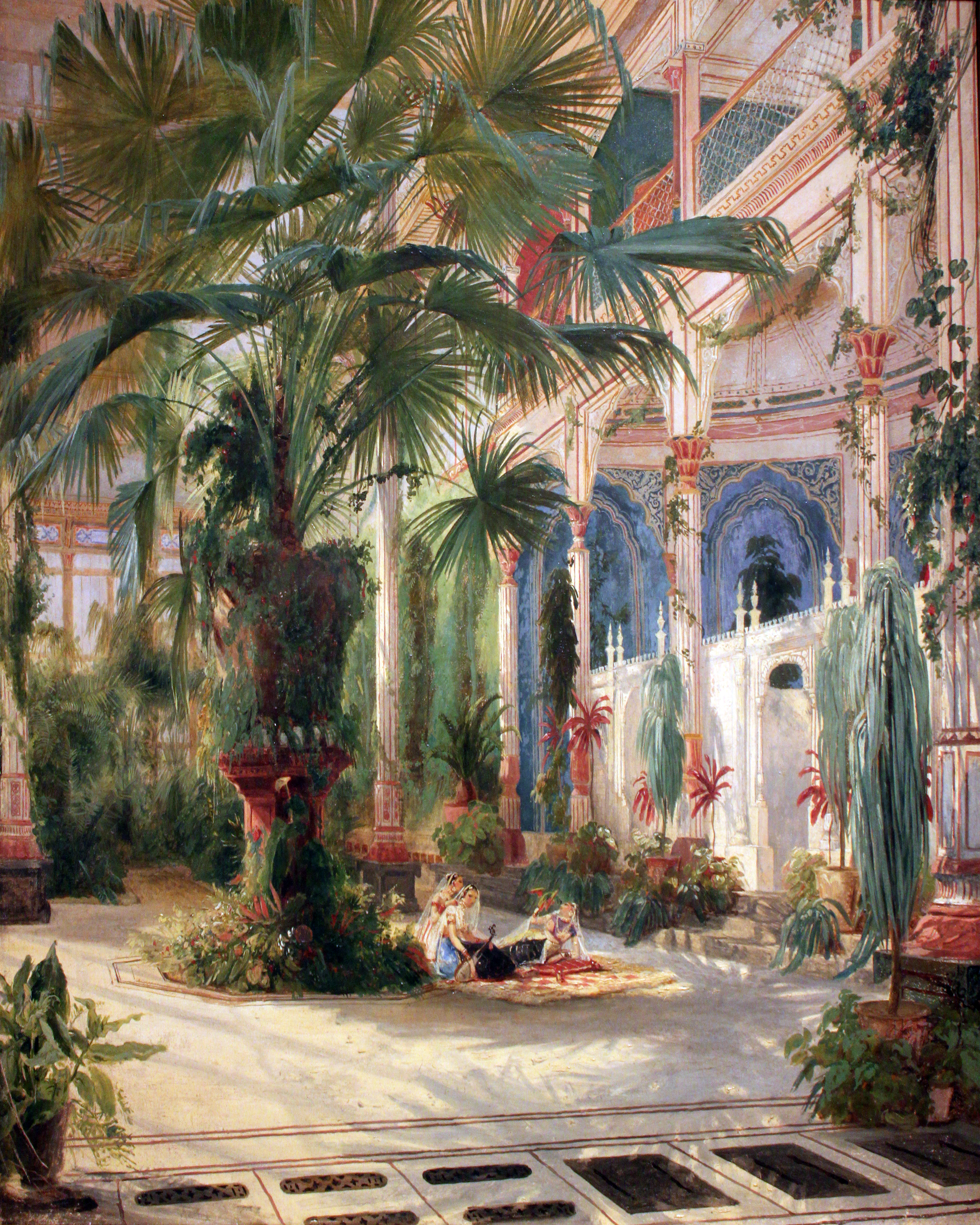
- Artist: Carl Blechen
- Year: 1832–1834
- Medium: Oil on canvas
- Dimensions: 64 cm × 56 cm (25 in × 22 in)
- Location: Hamburger Kunsthalle

The Interior of the Palm House on the Pfaueninsel near Potsdam
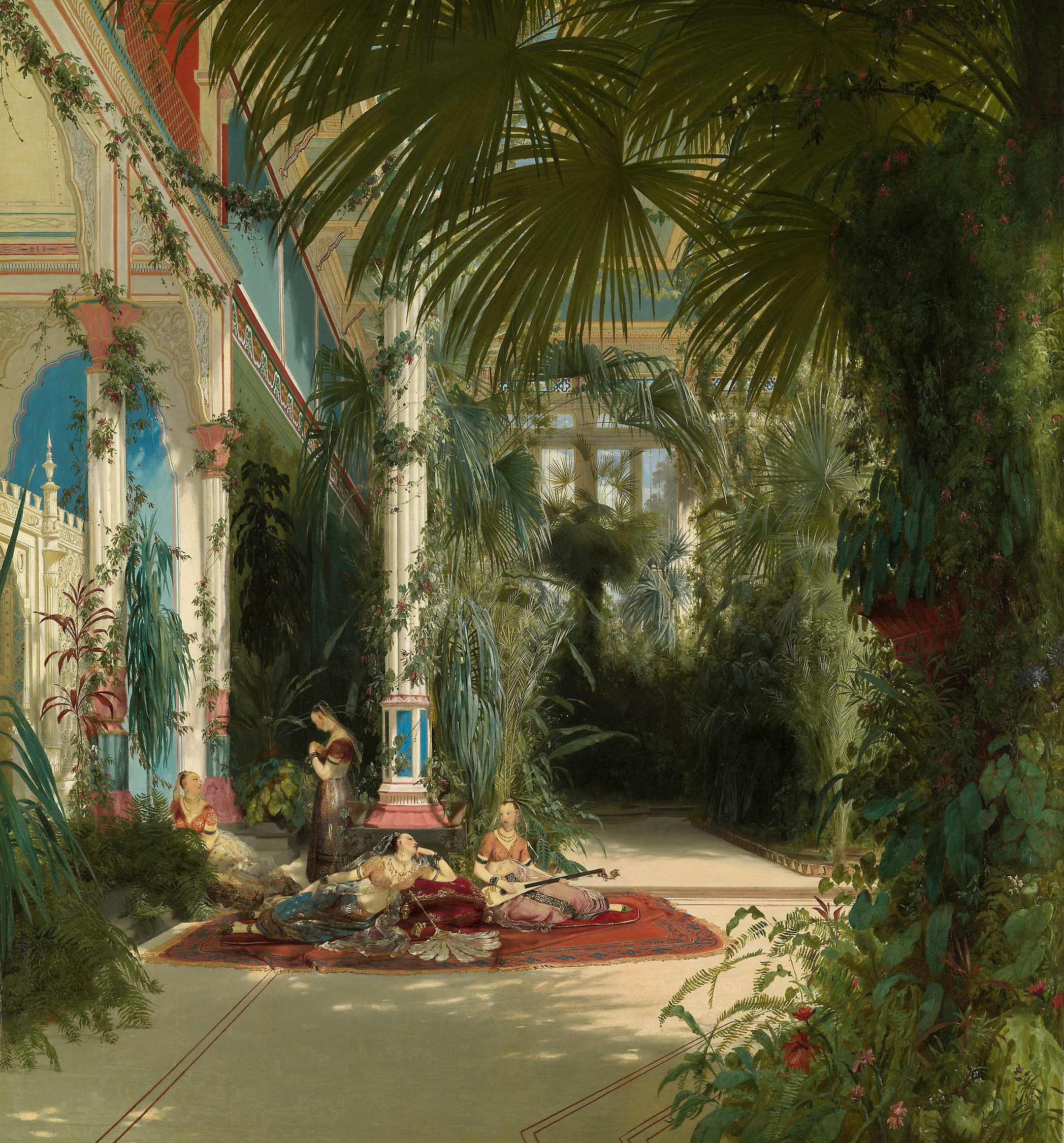
- Artist: Carl Blechen
- Year: 1834
- Medium: Oil on canvas
- Dimensions: 135 cm × 126 cm (53 in × 50 in)
- Location: Art Institute of Chicago
- Owner: Art Institute of Chicago
- Accession: 1996.388

The Interior of the Palm House on the Pfaueninsel Near Potsdam, commonly shortened to The Interior of the Palm House or The Palm House (German: Das Innere des Palmenhauses), is the title of two paintings in oil on canvas by Carl Blechen. Both depict four odalisques as they relax in a palm house (which was destroyed by fire in 1880) at the royal retreat of Pfaueninsel, though the angles of view and compositions are different. The first to be painted, in 1833, is now in the Hamburger Kunsthalle in Hamburg, Germany, and has a size of 64 cm × 56 cm (25 in × 22 in). The second version, from 1834, is now in the Art Institute of Chicago, measuring 135 cm × 126 cm (53 in × 50 in). An 1832 color study for the painting is also in the collection of the Alte Nationalgalerie in Berlin.

== Background ==
At the suggestion of the naturalist Alexander von Humboldt, King Frederick William III of Prussia purchased the Foulchiron Palm Collection. The Palm House was designed by Karl Friedrich Schinkel and completed in 1834. It was constructed on Pfaueninsel, an island near Potsdam that was a popular retreat for royals. Frederick William commissioned Blechen, who was generally regarded as a landscape painter and had even been recently appointed as the Professor of Landscape Painting at the Akademie der Künste, to create two or three paintings of the Palm House at the cost of one thousand Taler.

== Description ==
Both paintings are naturalistic depictions of the interior of the Palm House, with a central group of figures who are presumably a fanciful insertion. At the center of each painting, four odalisques dressed in Oriental-style, gold-trimmed outfits are lounging on cushions and a carpet. The addition of odalisques into paintings was a common trope in Orientalist painting. The odalisques, much like the palm trees and the Indian architecture, are treated as exotic objects and symbolize the power and wealth of European royalty and aristocrats. The large tree in the foreground highlights the size of the Palm House by framing the view and directing the viewer to the interior of the building.

== Ownership history ==
Frederick William most likely gifted the Chicago painting to his daughter, Alexandra Feodorovna, the wife of Emperor Nicholas I of Russia. The painting remained in the Russian imperial collection until c. 1917. It then became part of a Swiss collection c. 1920. Before the Art Institute of Chicago purchased it in 1996, the painting had been owned by an art dealer and a private collector.

The Alte Nationalgalerie purchased one of Blechen's color studies for the painting, The Palm House on the Pfaueninsel, in an auction in 1898.

== Gallery ==
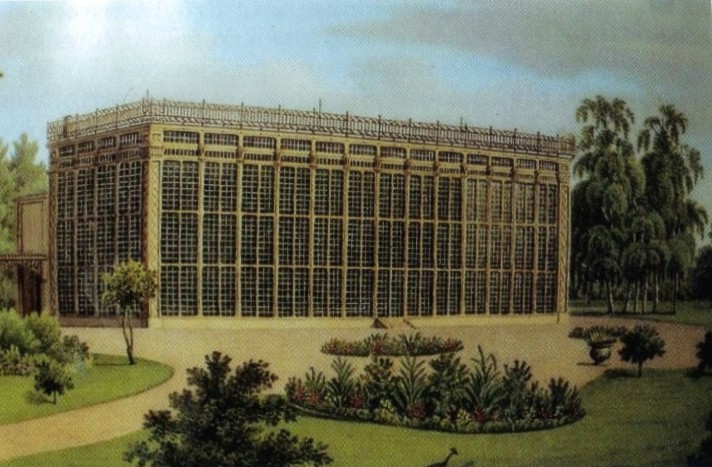
The Palm House, painted on a vase in 1836

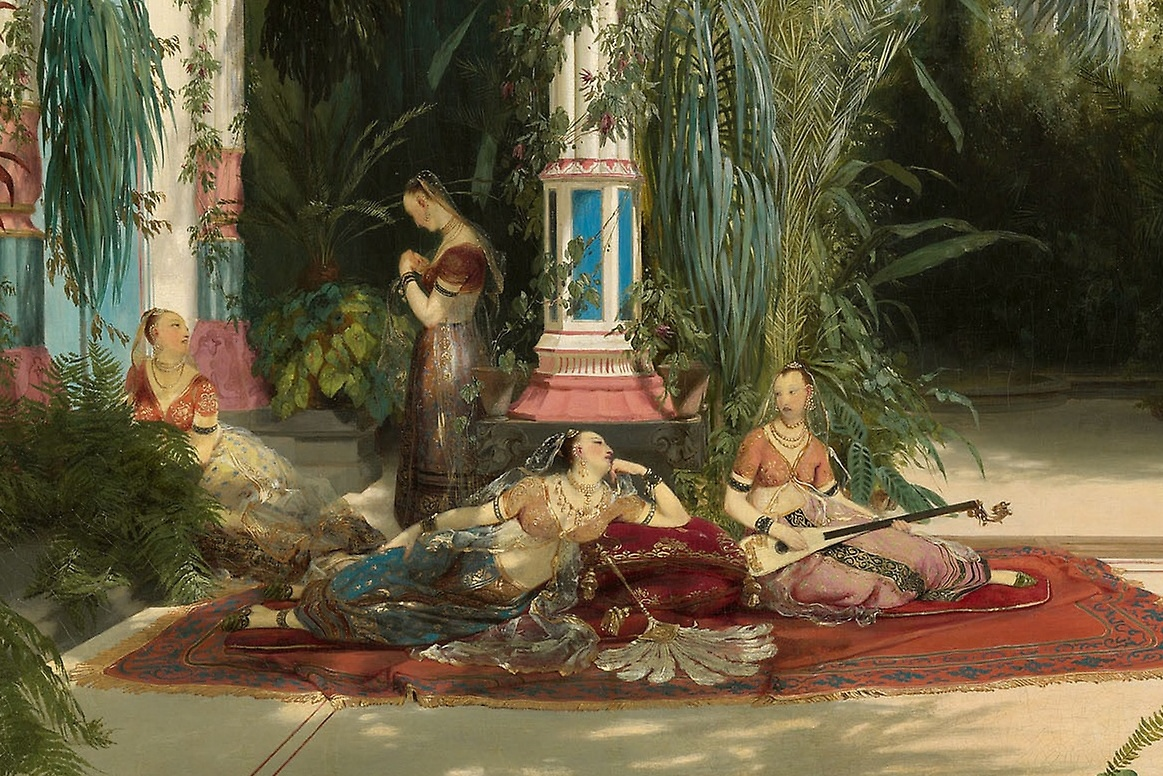
Close-up of the odalisques

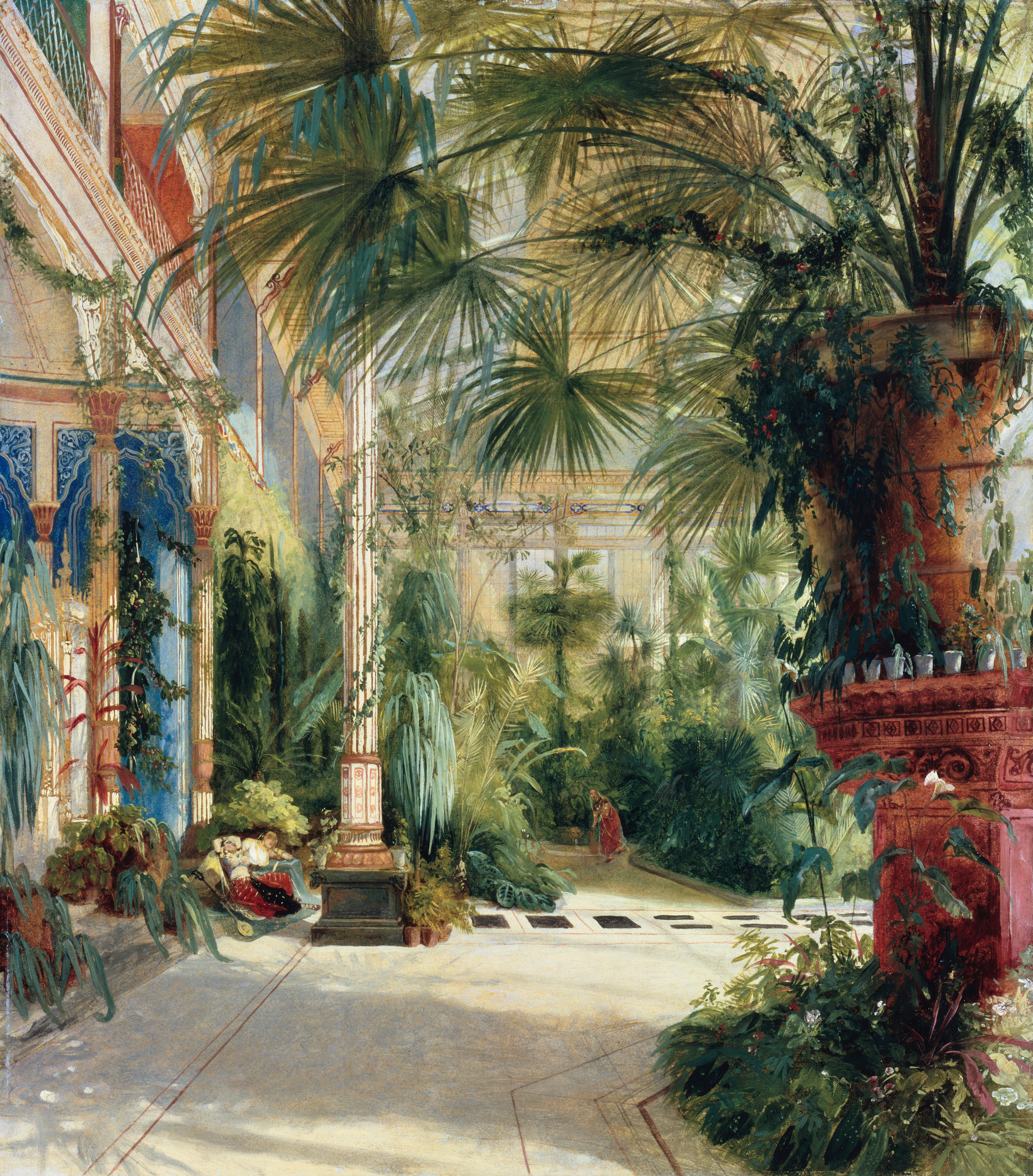
Version of the painting at the Alte Nationalgalerie
