= Portrait of Louis Philippe I (Gérard) =

Painting by François Gérard

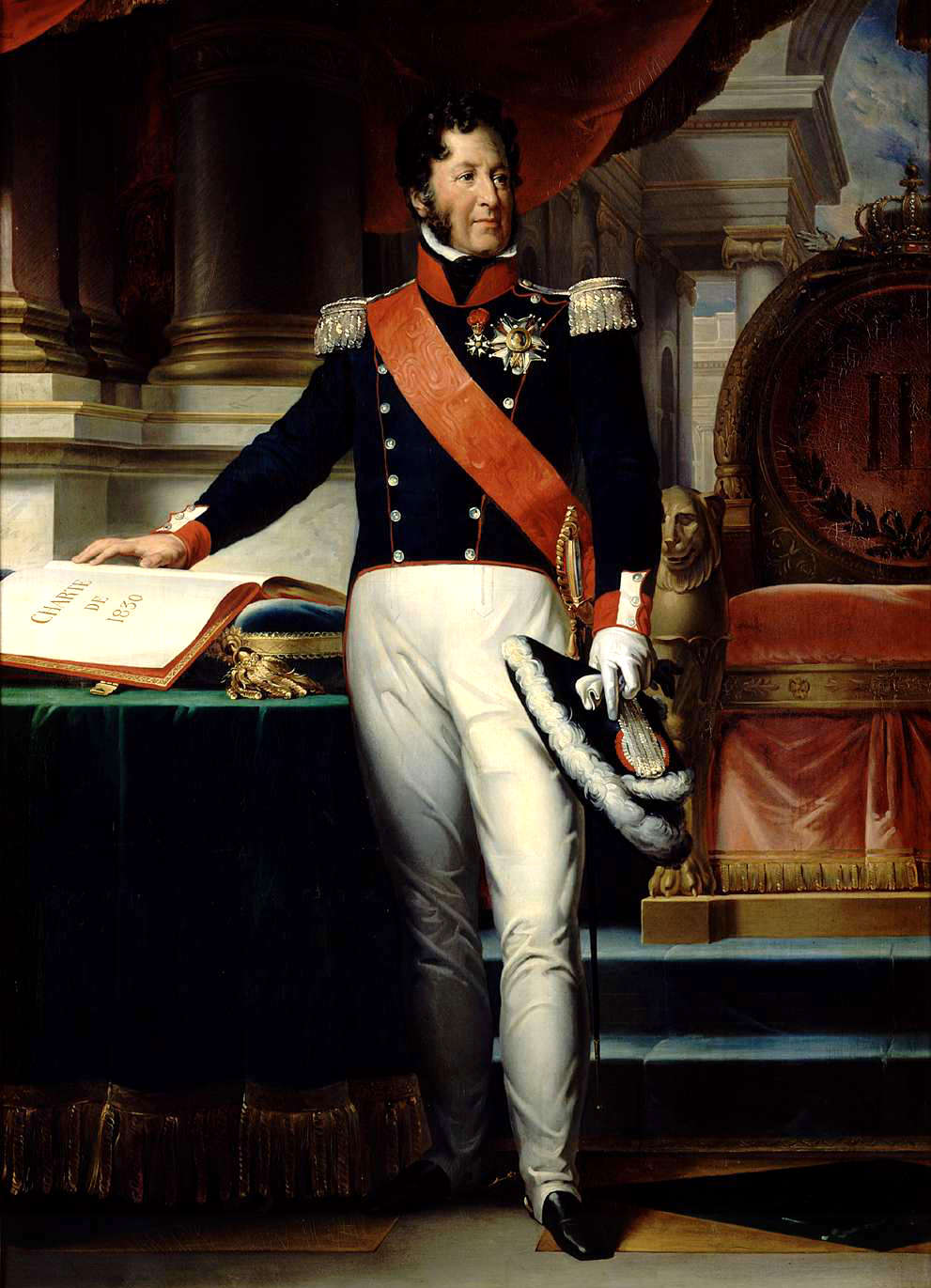
- Artist: François Gérard
- Year: 1834
- Type: Oil on canvas, portrait painting
- Dimensions: 222 cm × 156 cm (87 in × 61 in)
- Location: Palace of Versailles, Versailles

Portrait of Louis Philippe I is an oil on canvas portrait painting by the French artist François Gérard, from 1834. It depicts the reigning king of the French Louis Philippe I in the uniform of the National Guard with a copy of the Charter of 1830. It is held at the Palace of Versailles.

== History ==
Louis Philippe, a distant cousin of the previous monarch Charles X, came to power following the July Revolution of 1830. Gérard was known for accommodating himself to the changing rulers of France, having previously produced numerous portraits of Napoleon's Bonaparte Dynasty and then the royal family during the Restoration period.

The current work was based on a painting produced for the City Hall of Paris in 1831, which was later destroyed. The painting was commissioned by the authorities in 1833 for 6,000 francs. Today the painting is in the collection of the Palace of Versailles. Another version is now in the Louvre in Paris.

== See also ==
- Portrait of Louis Philippe I (Winterhalter), an 1841 painting by Franz Xaver Winterhalter

== Bibliography ==
- Hensel, Tina. Das Bild der Herrscherin: Franz Xaver Winterhalter und die Gattungspolitik des Porträts im 19. Jahrhundert. ISBN 3111084876. Walter de Gruyter, 2023.
- Price, Munro. The Perilous Crown: France Between Revolutions, 1814-1848. ISBN 1405040823.Pan Macmillan, 2010.
