= A Highland Breakfast =

Painting by Edwin Landseer

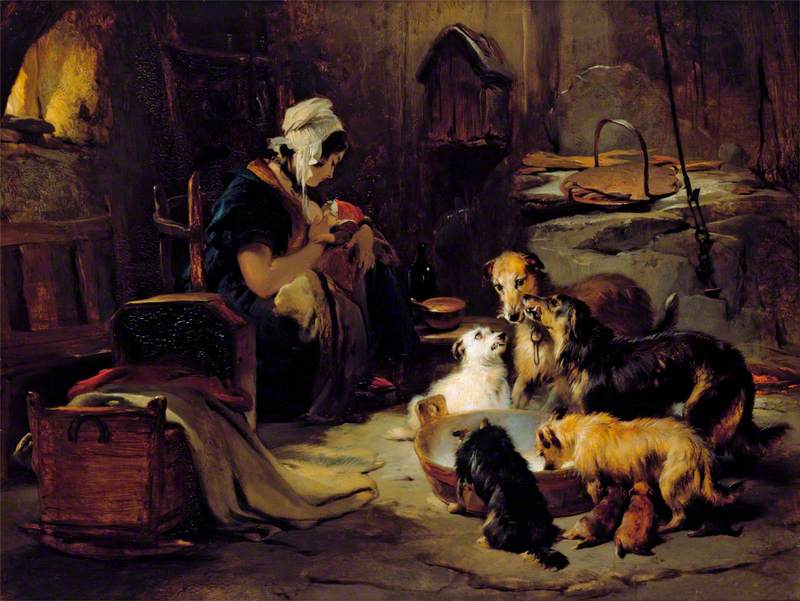
- Artist: Edwin Landseer
- Year: 1834
- Type: Oil on panel, genre painting
- Dimensions: 50.8 cm × 66 cm (20.0 in × 26 in)
- Location: Victoria and Albert Museum, London

A Highland Breakfast is an 1834 genre painting by the British artist Edwin Landseer. It depicts a scene in a bothy in the Scottish Highlands where a woman breastfeeds her baby while a group of dogs are eating their breakfast from a wooden bowl. It draws a juxtaposition between human and animals behaviour.

It was displayed at the Royal Academy's Summer Exhibition of 1834 at Somerset House in London. Today the painting is in the collection of the Victoria and Albert Museum in South Kensington having been acquired through the Sheepshanks Gift of the art collector John Sheepshanks in 1857.

== Bibliography ==
- Herrmann, Luke. Nineteenth Century British Painting. Charles de la Mare, 2000
- Ormond, Richard. Sir Edwin Landseer. Philadelphia Museum of Art, 1981.
