= Suspense (painting) =

Painting by Edwin Landseer

- Artist: Edwin Landseer
- Year: 1834
- Type: Oil on panel, genre painting
- Dimensions: 69.9 cm × 90.8 cm (27.5 in × 35.7 in)
- Location: Victoria and Albert Museum; London

Suspense is an 1834 oil painting by the British artist Edwin Landseer. It depicts a bloodhound looking anxiously at a closed door. The discarded plume and gauntlet as well as drops of blood suggest that some violent action has taken place to his master. However, Landseer leaves exactly what has happened to speculation.

It was displayed at the annual exhibition of the British Institution in Pall Mall in 1834. Today it is in the collection of the Victoria and Albert Museum in South Kensington, having been given by the art collector John Sheepshanks as part of the Sheepshanks Gift in 1857. An engraving based on the painting was produced in 1837 by Benjamin Phelps Gibbon.

== Bibliography ==
- Herrmann, Luke. Nineteenth Century British Painting. Charles de la Mare, 2000.
- Ormond, Richard. Sir Edwin Landseer. Philadelphia Museum of Art, 1981.
- Roe, Sonia. Oil Paintings in Public Ownership in the Victoria and Albert Museum. Public Catalogue Foundation, 2008.
