= Jean-Baptiste-Camille Corot =

French painter and printmaker (1796–1875)

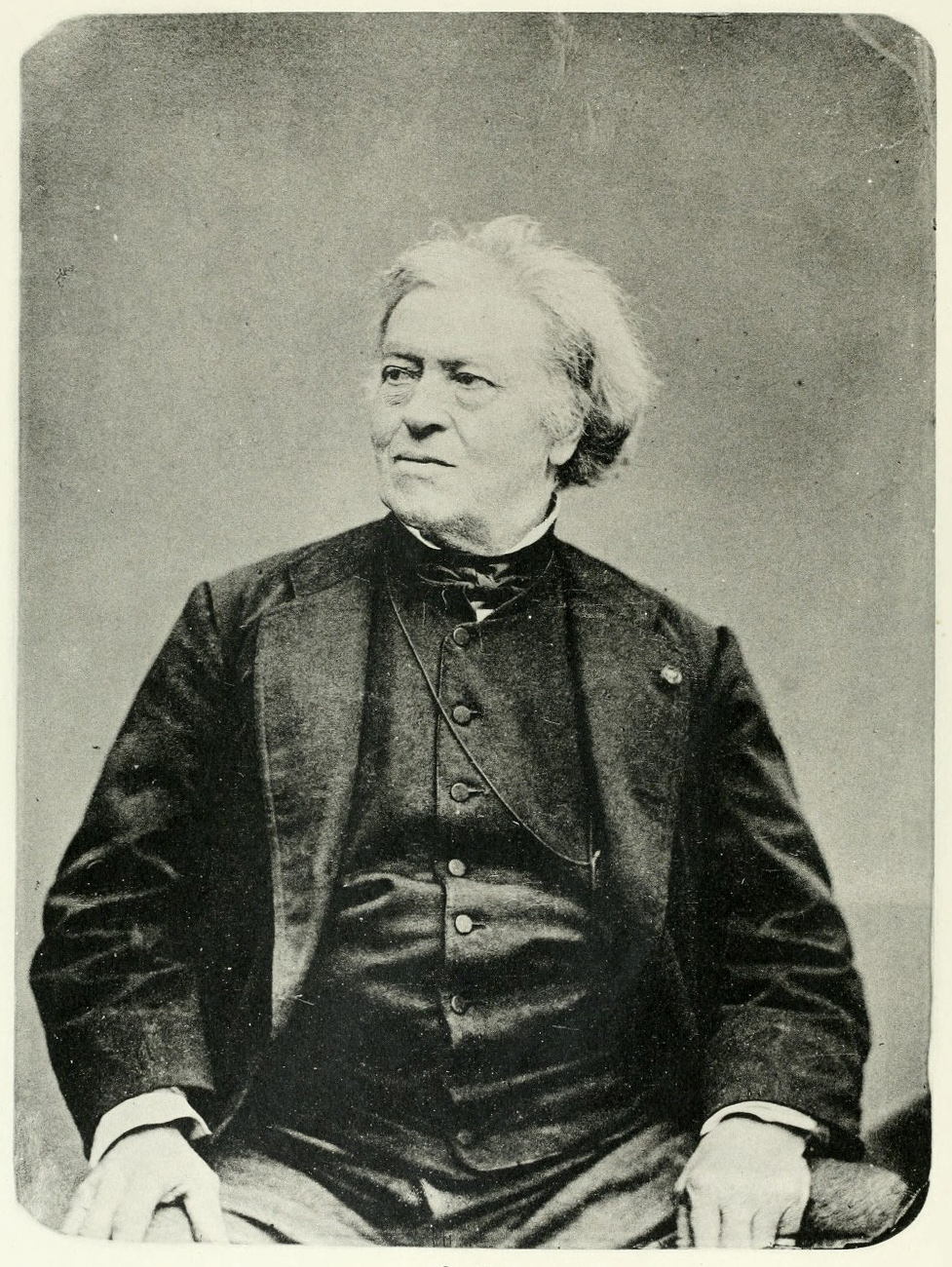
- Portrait by Étienne Carjat, 1870
- Born: Jean-Baptiste-Camille Corot; 16 July 1796; Paris, France
- Died: 22 February 1875 (aged 78); Paris, France
- Known for: Painting, printmaking
- Movement: Realism

Jean-Baptiste-Camille Corot (UK: /ˈkɒroʊ/ KORR-oh, US: /kəˈroʊ, kɔːˈroʊ/ kə-ROH, kor-OH; French: [ʒɑ̃ batist kamij kɔʁo]; 16 July 1796 – 22 February 1875), or simply Camille Corot, was a French landscape and portrait painter as well as a printmaker in etching. A pivotal figure in landscape painting, his vast output simultaneously referenced the neoclassical tradition and anticipated the plein-air innovations of Impressionism.

== Biography ==
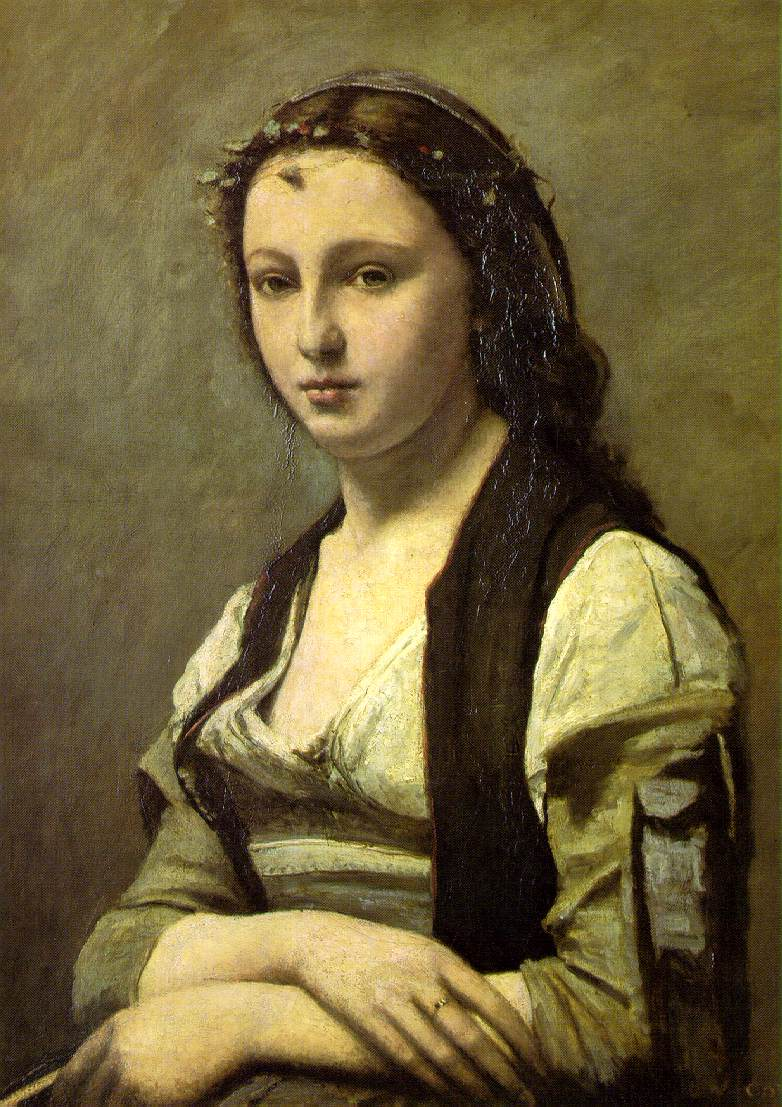
Woman with a Pearl, 1868–1870, Paris: Musée du Louvre

=== Early life and training ===
Jean-Baptiste-Camille Corot was born in Paris on 16 July 1796 in a house at 125 Rue du Bac, now demolished. His family were bourgeois people—his father was a wig maker and his mother, Marie-Françoise Corot, a milliner—and unlike the experience of some of his artistic colleagues, throughout his life he never felt the want of money, as his parents made good investments and ran their businesses well. After his parents married, they bought the millinery shop where his mother had worked and his father gave up his career as a wigmaker to run the business side of the shop. The store was a famous destination for fashionable Parisians and earned the family an excellent income. Corot was the second of three children born to the family, who lived above their shop during those years.

Corot received a scholarship to study at the Lycée Pierre-Corneille in Rouen, but left after having scholastic difficulties and entered a boarding school. He "was not a brilliant student, and throughout his entire school career he did not get a single nomination for a prize, not even for the drawing classes." Unlike many masters who demonstrated early talent and inclinations toward art, before 1815 Corot showed no such interest. During those years he lived with the Sennegon family, whose patriarch was a friend of Corot's father and who spent much time with young Corot on nature walks. It was in this region that Corot made his first paintings after nature. At nineteen, Corot was a "big child, shy and awkward. He blushed when spoken to. Before the beautiful ladies who frequented his mother's salon, he was embarrassed and fled like a wild thing... Emotionally, he was an affectionate and well-behaved son, who adored his mother and trembled when his father spoke." When Corot's parents moved into a new residence in 1817, the 21-year-old Corot moved into the dormer-windowed room on the third floor, which became his first studio as well.

With his father's help Corot apprenticed to a draper, but he hated commercial life and despised what he called "business tricks", yet he faithfully remained in the trade until he was 26, when his father consented to him adopting the profession of art. Later Corot stated, "I told my father that business and I were simply incompatible, and that I was getting a divorce." The business experience proved beneficial, however, by helping him develop an aesthetic sense through his exposure to the colors and textures of the fabrics. Perhaps out of boredom, he turned to oil painting around 1821 and began immediately with landscapes. Starting in 1822 after the death of his sister, Corot began receiving a yearly allowance of 1500 francs which adequately financed his new career, studio, materials, and travel for the rest of his life. He immediately rented a studio on quai Voltaire.

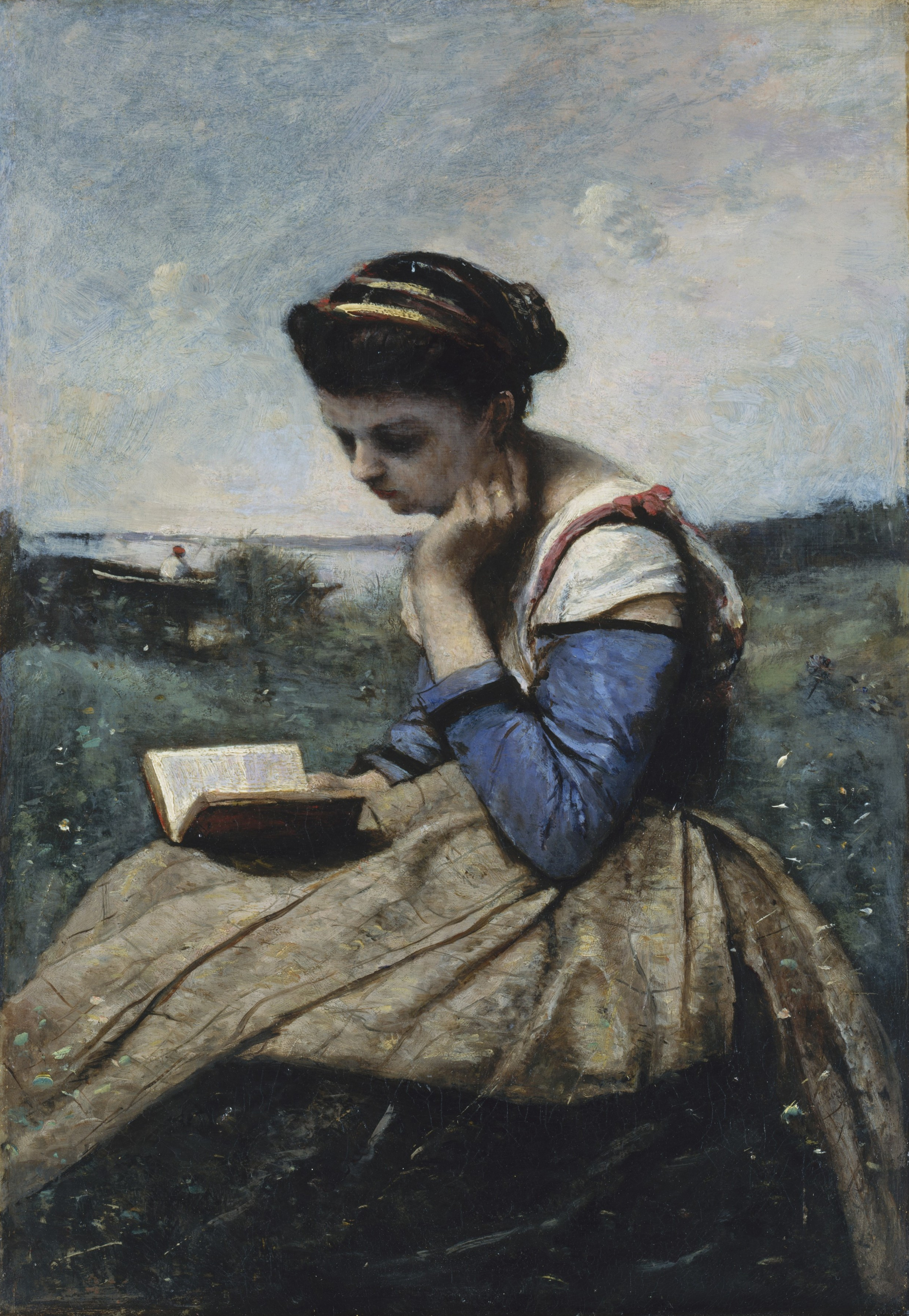
A Woman Reading, 1869/1870, Metropolitan Museum of Art

During the period when Corot acquired the means to devote himself to art, landscape painting was on the upswing and generally divided into two camps: one―historical landscape by Neoclassicists in Southern Europe representing idealized views of real and fancied sites peopled with ancient, mythological, and biblical figures; and two―realistic landscape, more common in Northern Europe, which was largely faithful to actual topography, architecture, and flora, and which often showed figures of peasants. In both approaches, landscape artists would typically begin with outdoor sketching and preliminary painting, with finishing work done indoors. Highly influential upon French landscape artists in the early 19th century was the work of Englishmen John Constable and J. M. W. Turner, who reinforced the trend in favor of Realism and away from Neoclassicism.

For a short period between 1821 and 1822, Corot studied with Achille Etna Michallon, a landscape painter of Corot's age who was a protégé of the painter Jacques-Louis David and who was already a well-respected teacher. Michallon had a great influence on Corot's career. Corot's drawing lessons included tracing lithographs, copying three-dimensional forms, and making landscape sketches and paintings outdoors, especially in the forests of Fontainebleau, the seaports along Normandy, and the villages west of Paris such as Ville-d'Avray (where his parents had a country house). Michallon also exposed him to the principles of the French Neoclassic tradition, as espoused in the famous treatise of theorist Pierre-Henri de Valenciennes, and exemplified in the works of French Neoclassicists Claude Lorrain and Nicolas Poussin, whose major aim was the representation of ideal Beauty in nature, linked with events in ancient times.

Though this school was on the decline, it still held sway in the Salon, the foremost art exhibition in France attended by thousands at each event. Corot later stated, "I made my first landscape from nature...under the eye of this painter, whose only advice was to render with the greatest scrupulousness everything I saw before me. The lesson worked; since then I have always treasured precision." After Michallon's early death in 1822, Corot studied with Michallon's teacher, Jean-Victor Bertin, among the best known Neoclassic landscape painters in France, who had Corot draw copies of lithographs of botanical subjects to learn precise organic forms. Though holding Neoclassicists in the highest regard, Corot did not limit his training to their tradition of allegory set in imagined nature. His notebooks reveal precise renderings of tree trunks, rocks, and plants which show the influence of Northern realism. Throughout his career, Corot demonstrated an inclination to apply both traditions in his work, sometimes combining the two.

=== First trip to Italy ===
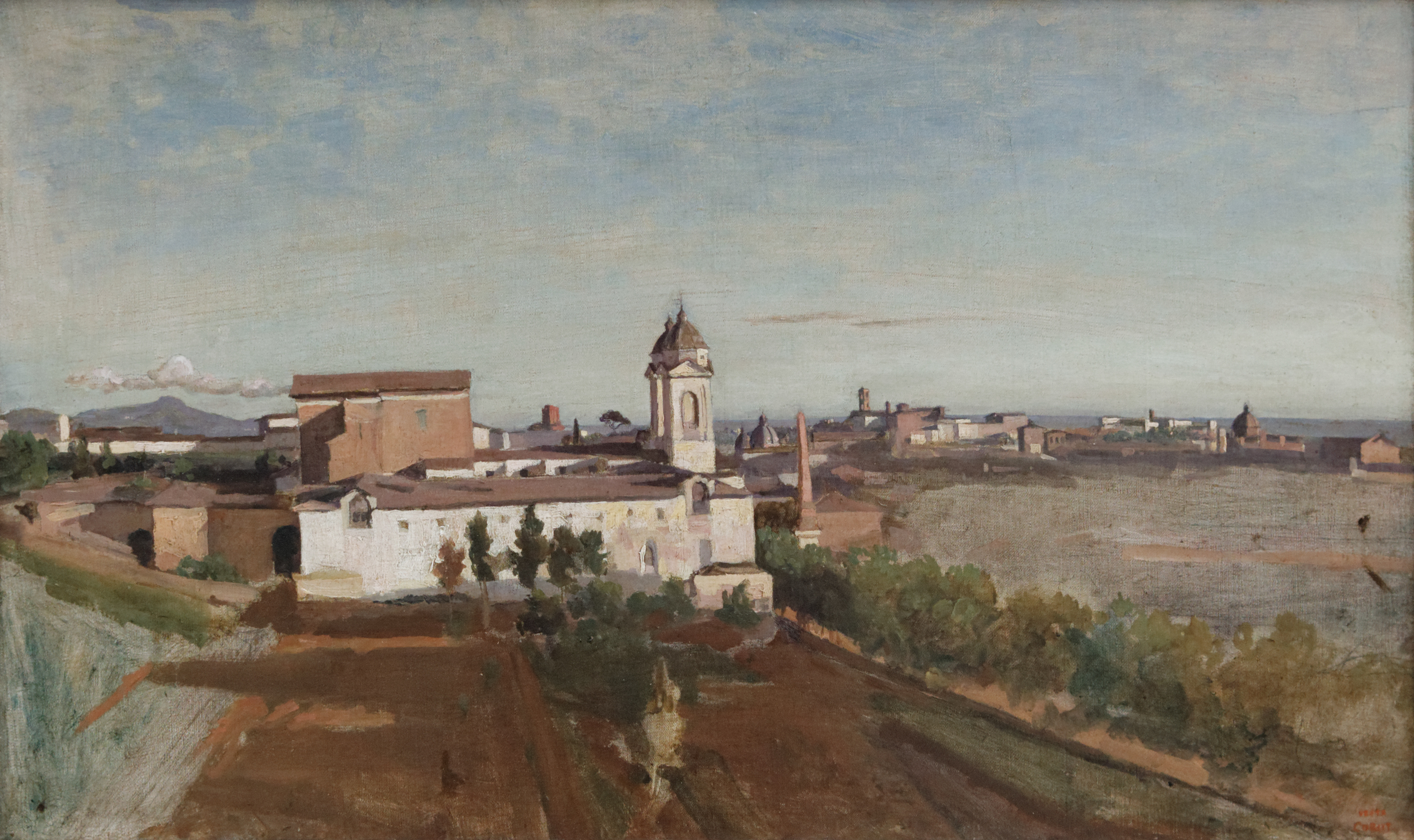
La Trinité-des-Monts, seen from the Villa Medici, 1825–1828, oil on canvas. Paris: Musée du Louvre.

With his parents' support, Corot followed the well-established pattern of French painters who went to Italy to study the masters of the Italian Renaissance and to draw the crumbling monuments of Roman antiquity. A condition by his parents before leaving was that he paint a self-portrait for them, his first. Corot's stay in Italy from 1825 to 1828 was a highly formative and productive one, during which he completed over 200 drawings and 150 paintings. He worked and traveled with several young French painters also studying abroad who painted together and socialized at night in the cafes, critiquing each other and gossiping. Corot learned little from the Renaissance masters (though later he cited Leonardo da Vinci as his favorite painter) and spent most of his time around Rome and in the Italian countryside. The Farnese Gardens with its splendid views of the ancient ruins was a frequent destination, and he painted it at three different times of the day. The training was particularly valuable in gaining an understanding of the challenges of both the mid-range and panoramic perspective, and in effectively placing man-made structures in a natural setting. He also learned how to give buildings and rocks the effect of volume and solidity with proper light and shadow, while using a smooth and thin technique. Furthermore, placing suitable figures in a secular setting was a necessity of good landscape painting, to add human context and scale, and it was even more important in allegorical landscapes. To that end Corot worked on figure studies in native garb as well as nude. During winter, he spent time in a studio but returned to work outside as quickly as weather permitted. The intense light of Italy posed considerable challenges, "This sun gives off a light that makes me despair. It makes me feel the utter powerlessness of my palette." He learned to master the light and to paint the stones and sky in subtle and dramatic variation.

It was not only Italian architecture and light which captured Corot's attention. The late-blooming Corot was entranced with Italian females as well: "They still have the most beautiful women in the world that I have met....their eyes, their shoulders, their hands are spectacular. In that, they surpass our women, but on the other hand, they are not their equals in grace and kindness...Myself, as a painter I prefer the Italian woman, but I lean toward the French woman when it comes to emotion." In spite of his strong attraction to women, he wrote of his commitment to painting: "I have only one goal in life that I want to pursue faithfully: to make landscapes. This firm resolution keeps me from a serious attachment. That is to say, in marriage...but my independent nature and my great need for serious study make me take the matter lightly."

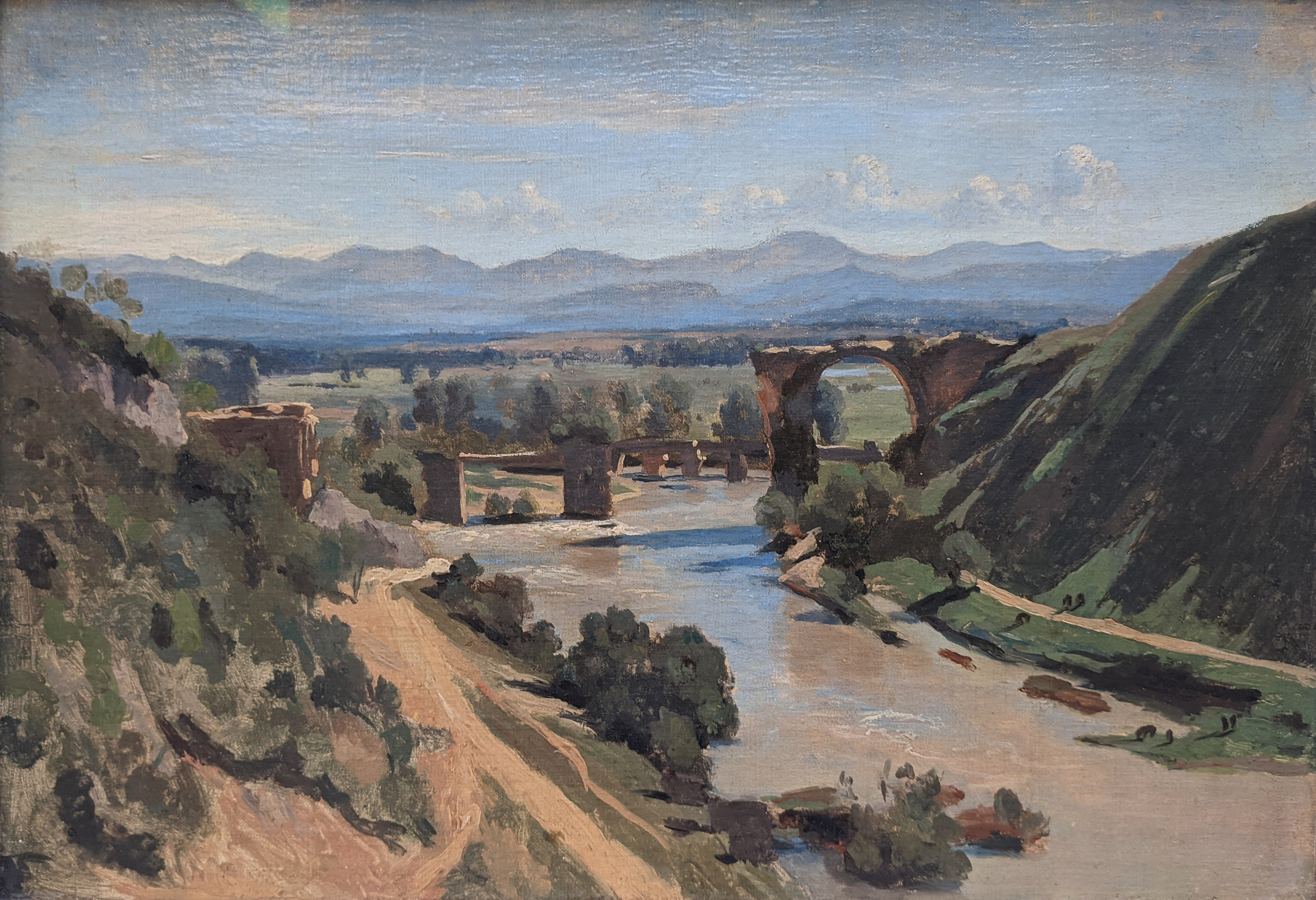
The Bridge at Narni, 1826, oil on paper. Paris: Musée du Louvre. A product of one of the artist's youthful sojourns to Italy, and in Kenneth Clark's words "as free as the most vigorous Constable".

=== Striving for the Salon ===
During the six-year period following his first Italian visit and his second, Corot focused on preparing large landscapes for presentation at the Salon. Several of his salon paintings were adaptations of his Italian oil sketches reworked in the studio by adding imagined, formal elements consistent with Neoclassical principles. An example of this was his first Salon entry, View at Narni (1827), where he took his quick, natural study of a ruin of a Roman aqueduct in dusty bright sun and transformed it into a falsely idyllic pastoral setting with giant shade trees and green lawns, a conversion meant to appeal to the Neoclassical jurors. Many critics have valued highly his plein-air Italian paintings for their "germ of Impressionism", their faithfulness to natural light, and their avoidance of academic values, even though they were intended as studies. Several decades later, Impressionism revolutionized art by a taking a similar approach—quick, spontaneous painting done in the out-of-doors; however, where the Impressionists used rapidly applied, un-mixed colors to capture light and mood, Corot usually mixed and blended his colors to get his dreamy effects.

When out of the studio, Corot traveled throughout France, mirroring his Italian methods, and concentrated on rustic landscapes. He returned to the Normandy coast and to Rouen, the city he lived in as a youth. Corot also did some portraits of friends and relatives, and received his first commissions. His sensitive portrait of his niece, Laure Sennegon, dressed in powder blue, was one of his most successful and was later donated to the Louvre. He typically painted two copies of each family portrait, one for the subject and one for the family, and often made copies of his landscapes as well.

View of the Forest of Fontainebleau (1830)

In the spring of 1829, Corot came to Barbizon to paint in the Forest of Fontainebleau; he had first painted in the forest at Chailly in 1822. He returned to Barbizon in the autumn of 1830 and in the summer of 1831, where he made drawings and oil studies, from which he made a painting intended for the Salon of 1830; his View of the Forest of Fontainebleau (now in the National Gallery in Washington) and, for the Salon of 1831, another View of the Forest of Fontainebleau. While there he met the members of the Barbizon school; Théodore Rousseau, Paul Huet, Constant Troyon, Jean-François Millet, and the young Charles-François Daubigny. Corot exhibited one portrait and several landscapes at the Salon in 1831 and 1833. His reception by the critics at the Salon was cool and Corot decided to return to Italy, having failed to satisfy them with his Neoclassical themes.

=== Mid-career ===
During his two return trips to Italy, he visited Northern Italy, Venice, and again the Roman countryside. In 1835, Corot created a sensation at the Salon with his biblical painting Agar dans le desert (Hagar in the Wilderness), which depicted Hagar, Sarah's handmaiden, and the child Ishmael, dying of thirst in the desert until saved by an angel. The background was likely derived from an Italian study. This time, Corot's unanticipated bold, fresh statement of the Neoclassical ideal succeeded with the critics by demonstrating "the harmony between the setting and the passion or suffering that the painter chooses to depict in it." He followed that up with other biblical and mythological subjects, but those paintings did not succeed as well, as the Salon critics found him wanting in comparisons with Poussin. In 1837, he painted his earliest surviving nude, The Nymph of the Seine. Later, he advised his students "The study of the nude, you see, is the best lesson that a landscape painter can have. If someone knows how, without any tricks, to get down a figure, he is able to make a landscape; otherwise he can never do it."

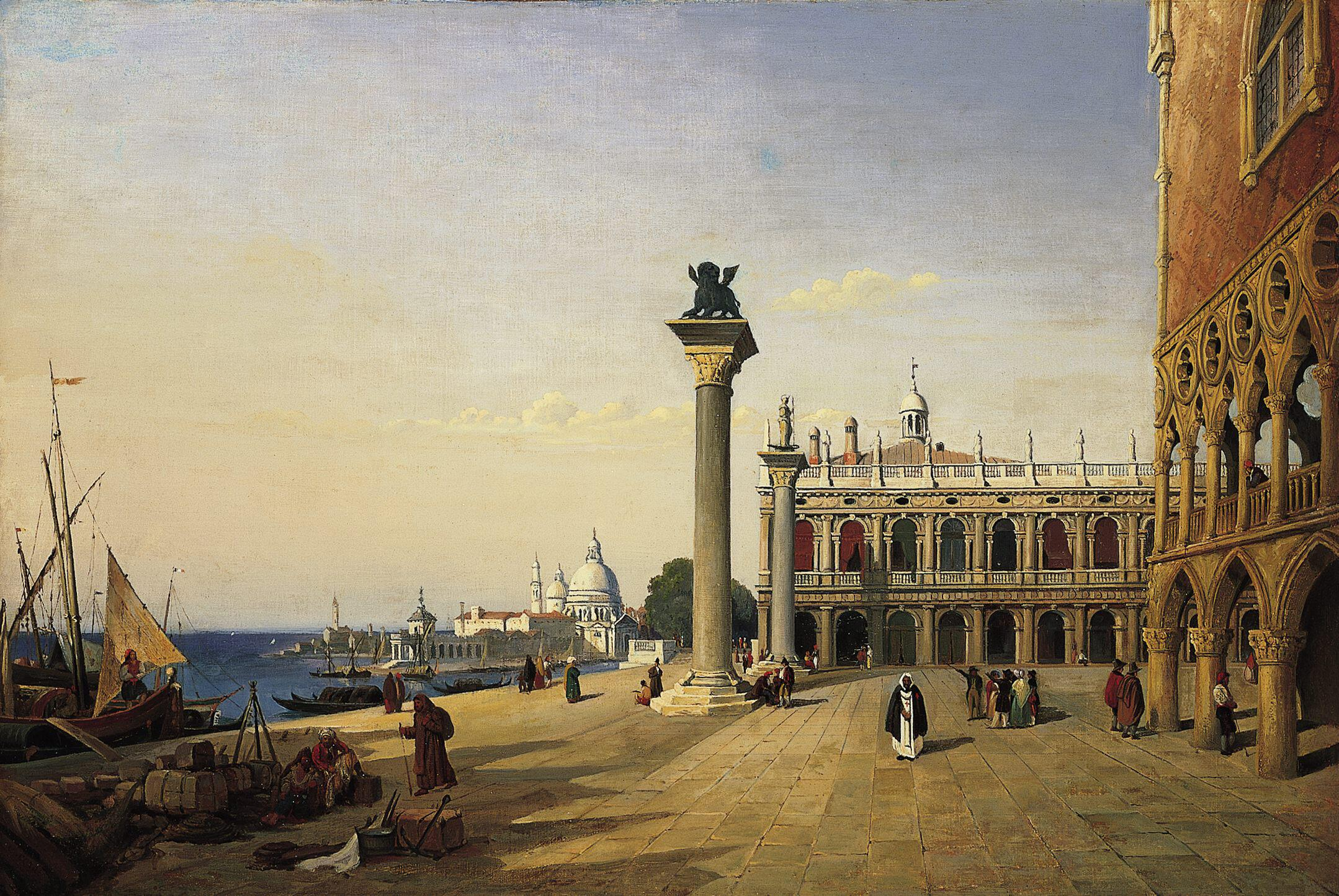
Venise, La Piazzetta, 1835

Through the 1840s, Corot continued to have his troubles with the critics (many of his works were flatly rejected for Salon exhibition), nor were many works purchased by the public. While recognition and acceptance by the establishment came slowly, by 1845 Baudelaire led a charge pronouncing Corot the leader in the "modern school of landscape painting". While some critics found Corot's colors "pale" and his work having "naive awkwardness", Baudelaire astutely responded, "M. Corot is more a harmonist than a colorist, and his compositions, which are always entirely free of pedantry, are seductive just because of their simplicity of color." In 1846, the French government decorated him with the cross of the Légion d'honneur and in 1848 he was awarded a second-class medal at the Salon, but he received little state patronage as a result. His only commissioned work was a religious painting for a baptismal chapel painted in 1847, in the manner of the Renaissance masters. Though the establishment kept holding back, other painters acknowledged Corot's growing stature. In 1847, Delacroix noted in his journal, "Corot is a true artist. One has to see a painter in his own place to get an idea of his worth...Corot delves deeply into a subject: ideas come to him and he adds while working; it's the right approach." Upon Delacroix's recommendation, the painter Constant Dutilleux bought a Corot painting and began a long and rewarding relationship with the artist, bringing him friendship and patrons. Corot's public treatment dramatically improved after the Revolution of 1848, when he was admitted as a member of the Salon jury. He was promoted to an officer of the Salon of 1867.

Having forsaken any long-term relationships with women, Corot remained very close to his parents even in his fifties. A contemporary said of him, "Corot is a man of principle, unconsciously Christian; he surrenders all his freedom to his mother...he has to beg her repeatedly to get permission to go out...for dinner every other Friday." Apart from his frequent travels, Corot remained closely tethered to his family until his parents died, then at last he gained the freedom to go as he pleased. That freedom allowed him to take on students for informal sessions, including the Jewish artists Édouard Brandon and future Impressionist Camille Pissarro, who was briefly among them. Corot's vigor and perceptive advice impressed his students. Charles Daubigny stated, "He's a perfect Old Man Joy, this Father Corot. He is altogether a wonderful man, who mixes jokes in with his very good advice." Another student said of Corot, "the newspapers had so distorted Corot, putting Theocritus and Virgil in his hands, that I was quite surprised to find him knowing neither Greek nor Latin...His welcome is very open, very free, very amusing: he speaks or listens to you while hopping on one foot or on two; he sings snatches of opera in a very true voice", but he has a "shrewd, biting side carefully hidden behind his good nature."

By the mid-1850s, Corot's increasingly impressionistic style began to get the recognition that fixed his place in French art. "M. Corot excels...in reproducing vegetation in its fresh beginnings; he marvelously renders the firstlings of the new world." From the 1850s on, Corot painted many landscape souvenirs and paysages, dreamy imagined paintings of remembered locations from earlier visits painted with lightly and loosely dabbed strokes.

=== Later years ===
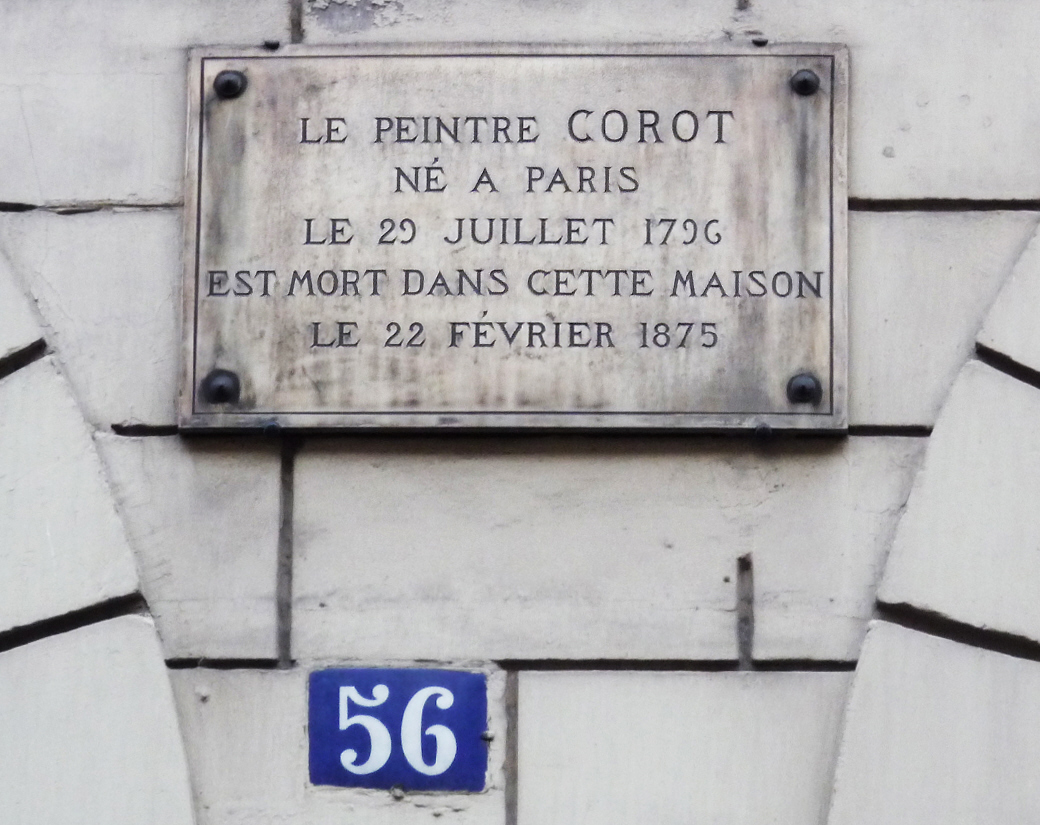
Plaque on the home of Camille Corot where he died 22 February 1875 at: 56, rue du Faubourg-Poissionnière, Paris, 10th arr.

In the 1860s, Corot was still mixing peasant figures with mythological ones, mixing Neoclassicism with Realism, causing one critic to lament, "If M. Corot would kill, once and for all, the nymphs of his woods and replace them with peasants, I should like him beyond measure." In reality, in later life his human figures did increase and the nymphs did decrease, but even the human figures were often set in idyllic reveries.

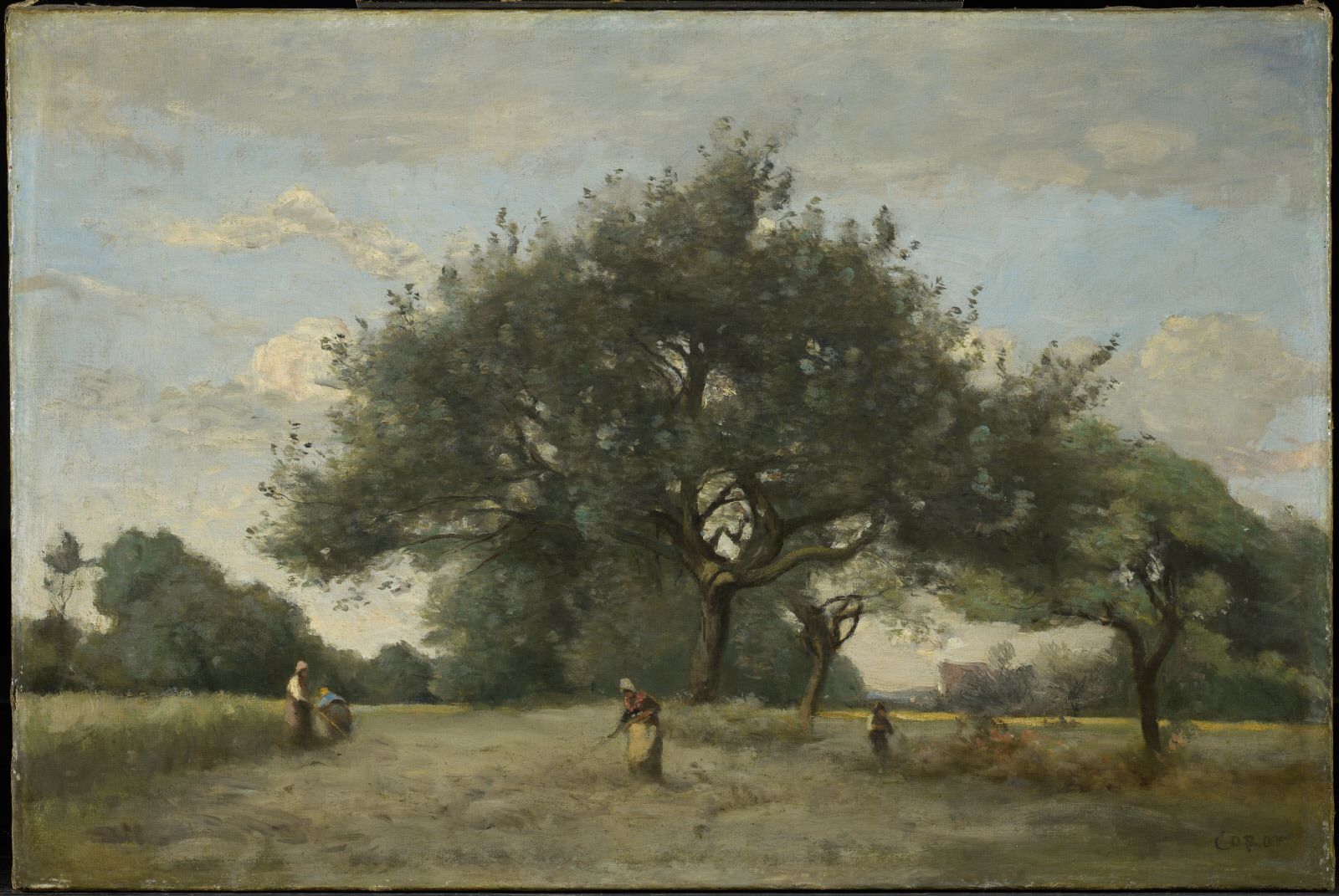
Apple Trees in a Field, c. 1865–70, oil on canvas. Clark Art Institute

In later life, Corot's studio was filled with students, models, friends, collectors, and dealers who came and went under the tolerant eye of the master, causing him to quip, "Why is it that there are ten of you around me, and not one of you thinks to relight my pipe." Dealers snapped up his works and his prices were often above 4,000 francs per painting. With his success secured, Corot gave generously of his money and time. He became an elder of the artists' community and would use his influence to gain commissions for other artists. In 1871 he gave £2000 for the poor of Paris, under siege by the Prussians. (see: Franco-Prussian War) During the actual Paris Commune, he was at Arras with Alfred Robaut. In 1872 he bought a house in Auvers as a gift for Honoré Daumier, who by then was blind, without resources, and homeless. In 1875, he donated 10,000 francs to the widow of Millet in support of her children. His charity was near proverbial. He also financially supported the upkeep of a day center for children on rue Vandrezanne in Paris. In later life, he remained a humble and modest man, apolitical and happy with his luck in life, and held close the belief that "men should not puff themselves up with pride, whether they are emperors adding this or that province to their empires or painter who gain a reputation."

Despite great success and appreciation among artists, collectors, and the more generous critics, his many friends considered, nevertheless, that he was officially neglected, and in 1874, a short time before his death, they presented him with a gold medal. He died in Paris of a stomach disorder aged 78 and was buried at Père Lachaise Cemetery.

A number of followers called themselves Corot's pupils. The best known are Camille Pissarro, Eugène Boudin, Berthe Morisot, Stanislas Lépine, Antoine Chintreuil, François-Louis Français, Charles Le Roux, and Alexandre Defaux.

== Art and technique ==
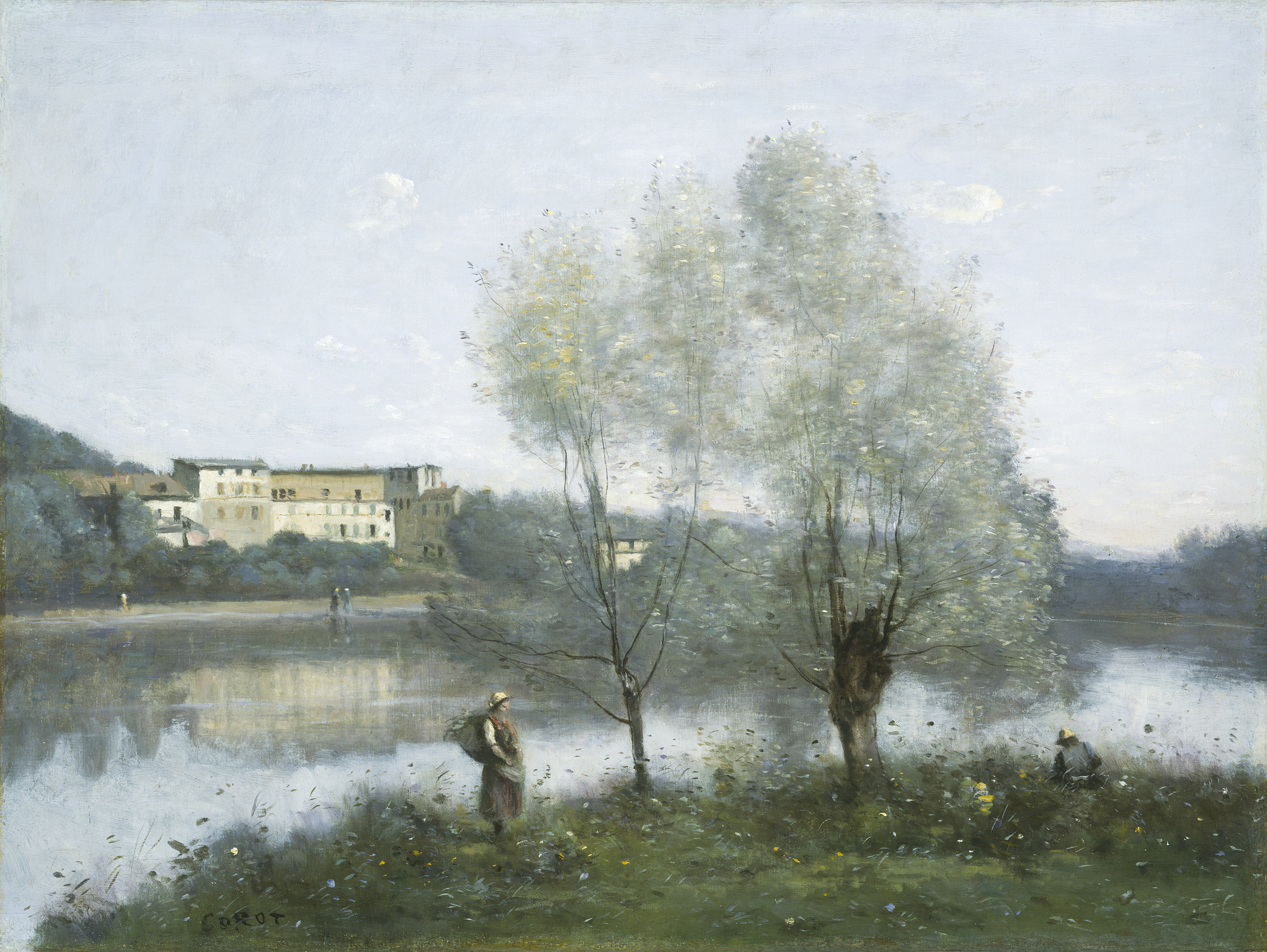
Ville d'Avray, ca. 1867, oil on canvas. Washington, D.C.: National Gallery of Art.

Corot is a pivotal figure in landscape painting. His work simultaneously references the Neo-Classical tradition and anticipates the plein-air innovations of Impressionism. Of him Claude Monet exclaimed in 1897, "There is only one master here—Corot. We are nothing compared to him, nothing." His contributions to figure painting are hardly less important; Degas preferred his figures to his landscapes, and the classical figures of Picasso pay overt homage to Corot's influence.

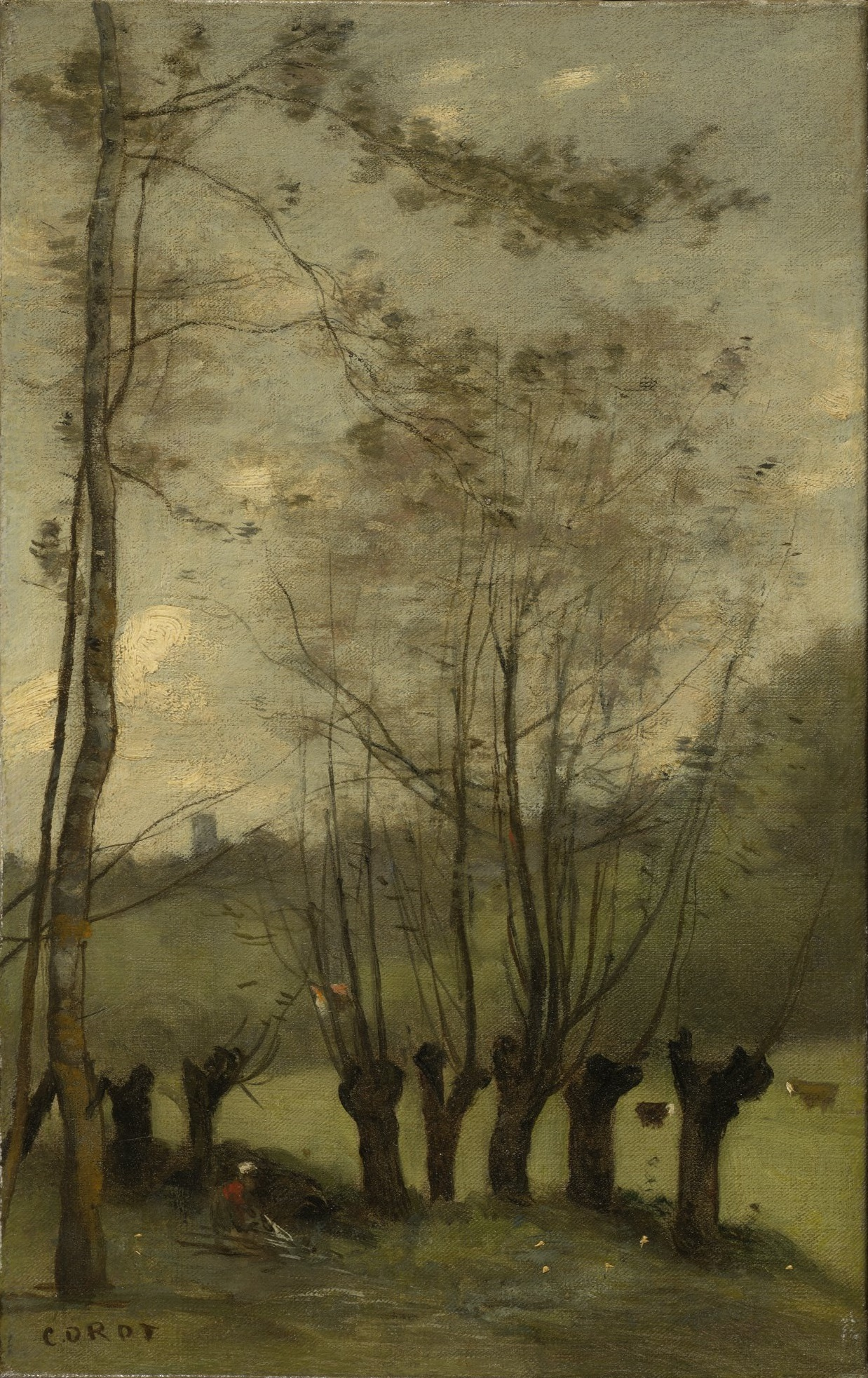
Meadow with Willows, Monthléry (1860s), Clark Art Institute, is an example of Corot's more impressionistic work

Historians have divided his work into periods, but the points of division are often vague, as he often completed a picture years after he began it. In his early period, he painted traditionally and "tight"—with minute exactness, clear outlines, thin brushwork, and with absolute definition of objects throughout, with a monochromatic underpainting or ébauche. After he reached his 50th year, his methods changed to focus on breadth of tone and an approach to poetic power conveyed with thicker application of paint; and about 20 years later, from about 1865 onwards, his manner of painting became more lyrical, affected with a more impressionistic touch, with brushstrokes becoming more apparent alongside an increased focus on tone. In part, this evolution in expression can be seen as marking the transition from the plein-air paintings of his youth, shot through with warm natural light, to the studio-created landscapes of his late maturity, enveloped in uniform tones of silver. In his final 10 years he became the "Père (Father) Corot" of Parisian artistic circles, where he was regarded with personal affection, and acknowledged as one of the five or six greatest landscape painters the world had seen, along with Meindert Hobbema, Claude Lorrain, J. M. W. Turner and John Constable. In his long and productive life, he painted over 3,000 paintings.

Though often credited as a precursor of Impressionist practice, Corot approached his landscapes more traditionally than is usually believed. Compared to the Impressionists who came later, Corot's palette is restrained, dominated with browns and blacks ("forbidden colors" among the Impressionists), along with dark and silvery green. Though appearing at times to be rapid and spontaneous, usually his strokes were controlled and careful, and his compositions well-thought out and generally rendered as simply and concisely as possible, heightening the poetic effect of the imagery. As he stated, "I noticed that everything that was done correctly on the first attempt was more true, and the forms more beautiful."

Corot's approach to his subjects was similarly traditional. Although he was a major proponent of plein-air studies, he was essentially a studio painter and few of his finished landscapes were completed before the motif. For most of his life, Corot would spend his summers travelling and collecting studies and sketches, and his winters finishing more polished, market-ready works. For example, the title of his Bathers of the Borromean Isles (1865–1870) refers to Lake Maggiore in Italy, despite the fact that Corot had not been to Italy in 20 years. His emphasis on drawing images from the imagination and memory rather than direct observation was in line with the tastes of the Salon jurors, of which he was a member.

In the 1860s, Corot became interested in photography, taking photos himself and becoming acquainted with many early photographers, which had the effect of suppressing his painting palette even more in sympathy with the monochromic tones of photographs. This had the result of making his paintings even less dramatic but somewhat more poetic, a result which caused some critics to cite a monotony in his later work. Théophile Thoré wrote that Corot "has only a single octave, extremely limited and in a minor key; a musician would say. He knows scarcely more than a single time of day, the morning, and a single color, pale grey." Corot responded:

What there is to see in painting, or rather what I am looking for, is the form, the whole, the value of the tones...That is why for me the color comes after, because I love more than anything else the overall effect, the harmony of the tones, while color gives you a kind of shock that I don't like. Perhaps it is the excess of this principal that makes people say I have leaden tones.

In his aversion to shocking color, Corot sharply diverged from the up-and-coming Impressionists, who embraced experimentation with vivid hues.

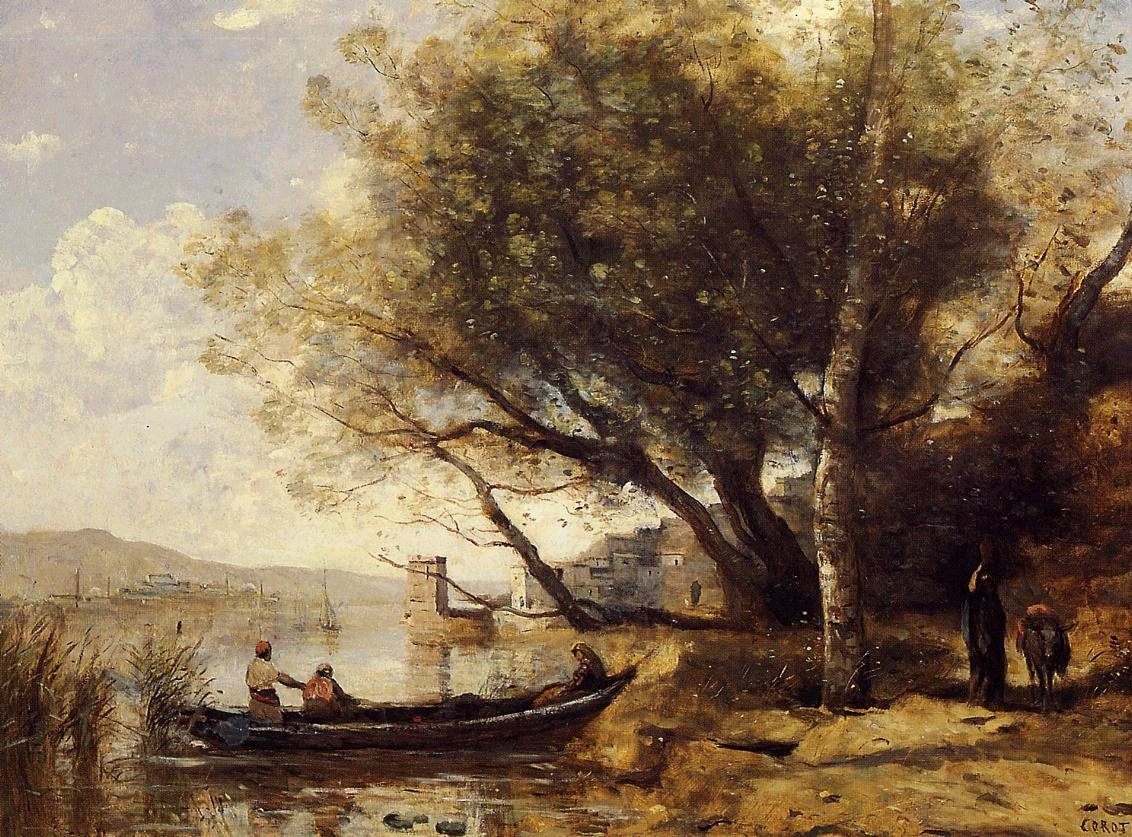
Bornova, İzmir, 1873

In addition to his landscapes (so popular was the late style that there exist numerous forgeries), Corot produced a number of prized figure pictures. While the subjects were sometimes placed in pastoral settings, these were mostly studio pieces, drawn from the live model with both specificity and subtlety. Like his landscapes, they are characterized by a contemplative lyricism, with his late paintings L'Algérienne (Algerian Woman) and La Jeune Grecque (The Greek Girl) being fine examples. Corot painted about fifty portraits, mostly of family and friends. He also painted thirteen reclining nudes, with his Les Repos (1860) strikingly similar in pose to Ingres famous Le Grande Odalisque (1814), but Corot's female is instead a rustic bacchante. In perhaps his last figure painting, Lady in Blue (1874), Corot achieves an effect reminiscent of Degas, soft yet expressive. In all cases of his figure painting, the color is restrained and is remarkable for its strength and purity. Corot also executed many etchings and pencil sketches. Some of the sketches used a system of visual symbols—circles representing areas of light and squares representing shadow. He also experimented with the cliché verre process—a hybrid of photography and engraving. Starting in the 1830s, Corot also painted decorative panels and walls in the homes of friends, aided by his students.

Corot summed up his approach to art around 1860: "I interpret with my art as much as with my eye."

The works of Corot are housed in museums in France and the Netherlands, Britain, North America and Russia.

== Forgeries ==
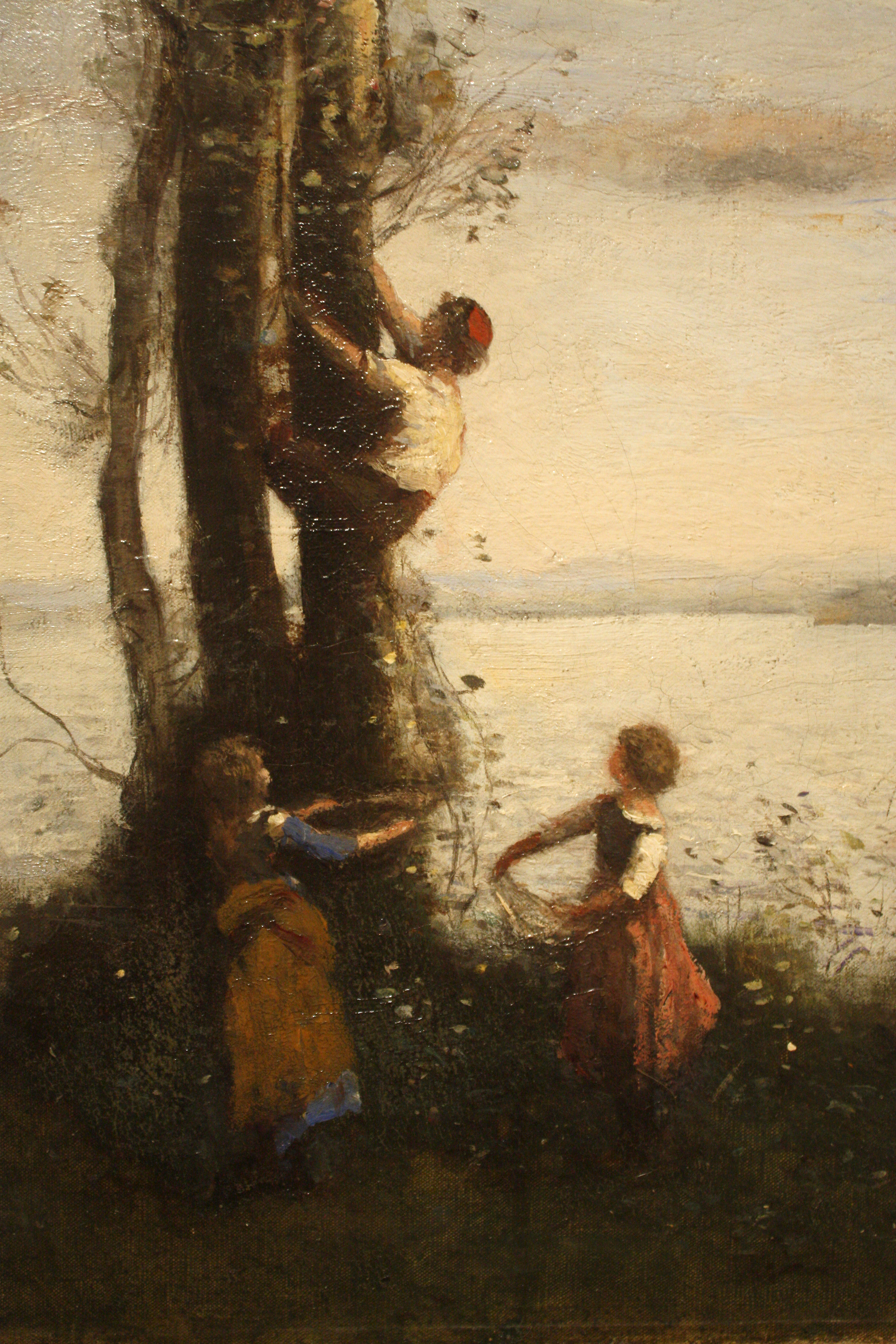
The Little Bird Nesters (1873–1874) detail

The strong market for Corot's works and his relatively easy-to-imitate late painting style resulted in a huge production of Corot forgeries between 1870 and 1939. René Huyghe famously quipped that "Corot painted three thousand canvases, ten thousand of which have been sold in America". Although this is a humorous exaggeration, thousands of forgeries have been amassed, with the Jousseaume collection alone containing 2,414 such works. Adding to the problem was Corot's lax attitude which encouraged copying and forgery. He allowed his students to copy his works and to even borrow the works for later return, he would touch up and sign student and collector copies, and he would loan works to professional copiers and to rental agencies. According to Corot cataloguist Etienne Moreau-Nélaton, at one copying studio "The master's complacent brush authenticated these replicas with a few personal and decisive retouchings. When he was no longer there to finish his "doubles", they went on producing them without him." The cataloging of Corot's works in an attempt to separate the copies from the originals backfired when forgers used the publications as guides to expand and refine their bogus paintings.

== In popular culture ==
Two of Corot's works are featured and play an important role in the plot of the 2008 French film L'Heure d'été (English title Summer Hour). The film was produced by the Musée d'Orsay, and the two works were lent by the museum for the making of the film.

Rue Corot on Île des Sœurs, Quebec is named after the artist.

In Arthur Conan Doyle's 1890 novel The Sign of the Four Thaddeus Sholto has an unknown work of Corot on display.

== Selected works ==
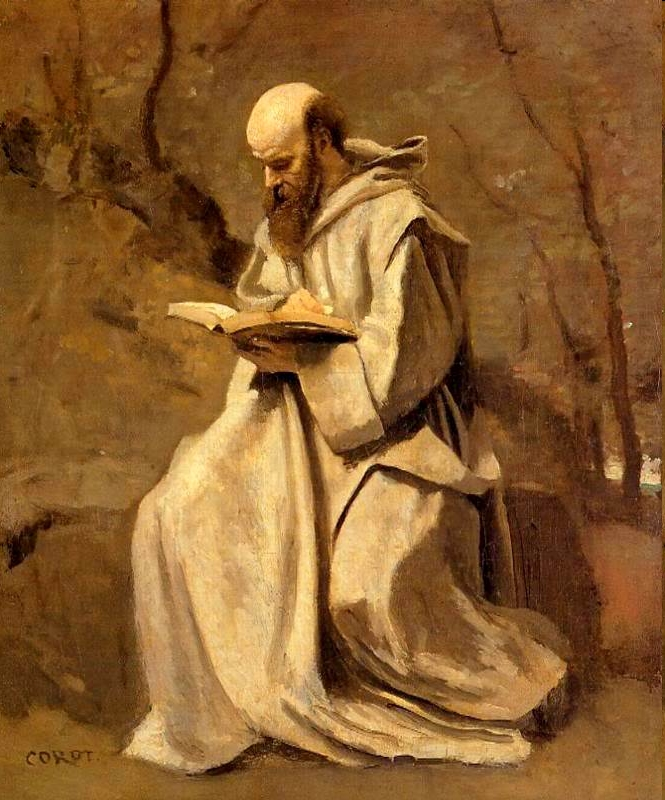
Monk Reading Book, 1850–1855

- The Bridge at Narni (1826), Musée du Louvre, Paris
- Venise, La Piazetta (1835), Musée du Louvre, Paris
- Le Baptême du Christ (1845–1847), Paris, Eglise Saint-Nicolas-du-Chardonnet
- The Dance of the Nymphs (1850), Musée d'Orsay, Paris
- Le concert champêtre (1857), Musée Condé, Chantilly
- Macbeth and the Witches (1859), Wallace Collection, London
- Baigneuses au Bord d'un Lac (1861), private collection
- Orpheus Leading Eurydice from the Underworld (1861), The Museum of Fine Arts, Houston
- Gitane au tambourin (1862), Botero Museum, Bogotá
- Meadow by the Swamp, National Museum of Serbia, Belgrade
- Vist of Castel Sant'Angelo, National Museum of Decorative Arts, Buenos Aires
- Souvenir de Mortefontaine (1864), Musée du Louvre, Paris
- L'Arbre brisé (1865)
- Ville d'Avray (1867), National Gallery of Art, Washington D.C.
- A Woman Reading (1869), Metropolitan Museum of Art, New York
- Diana Bathing (c. 1869–1870), Thyssen-Bornemisza Museum, Madrid
- Nymphes et Faunes (before 1870), Birmingham Museum of Art, Alabama
- The Parc des Lions at Port-Marly (1872), Thyssen-Bornemisza Museum, Madrid
- The Young Woman of Albano (L'Albanaise) (1872), Brooklyn Museum, New York
- Pastorale—Souvenir d'Italie (1873), Glasgow Art Gallery
- Biblis (1875)
- Canal in Picardy (c. 1861–1875), Toledo Museum of Art
- Landscape (unknown), Bass-Dwyer Collection

== Gallery ==
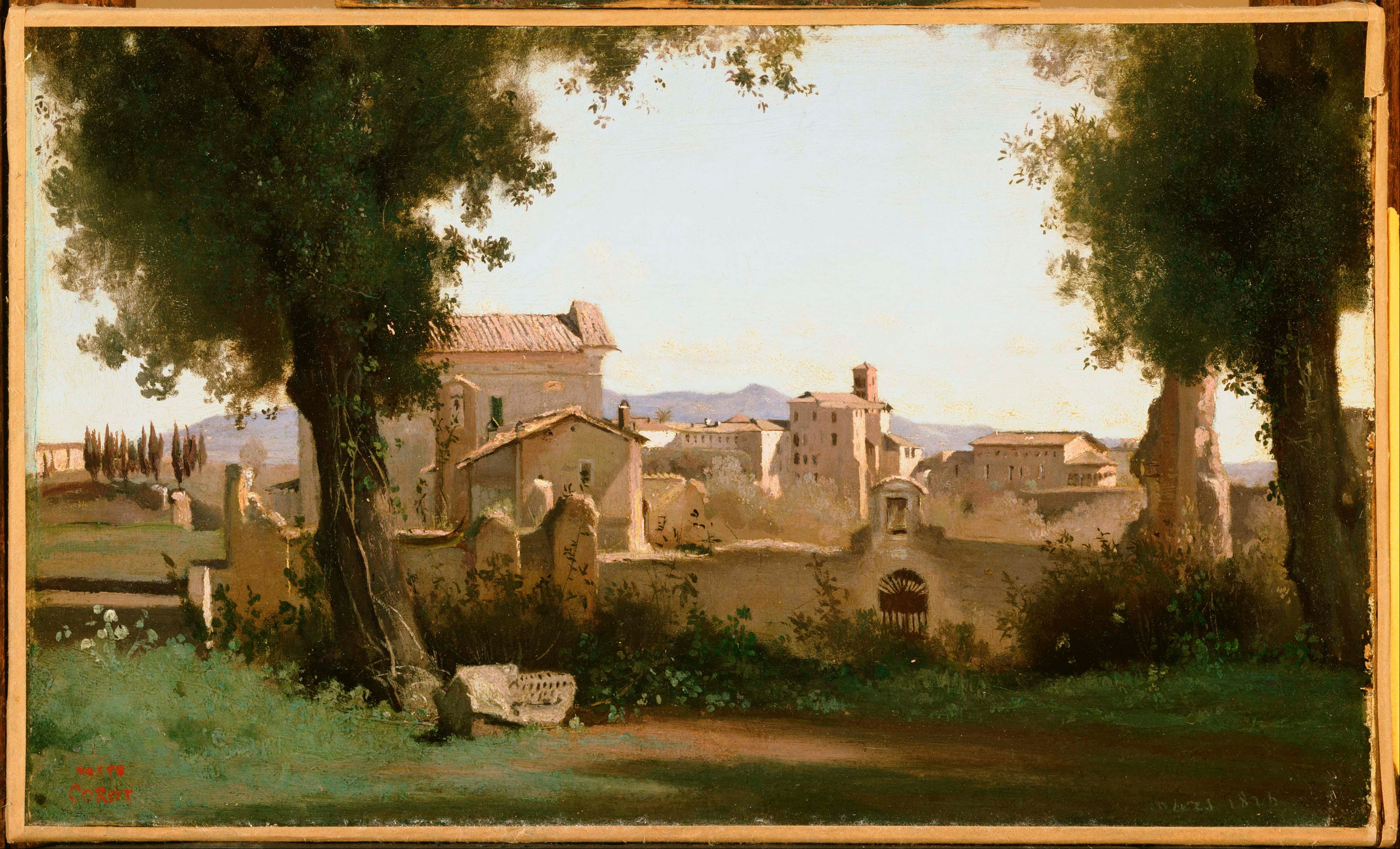
View from the Farnese Gardens (1826), The Phillips Collection, Washington D.C.

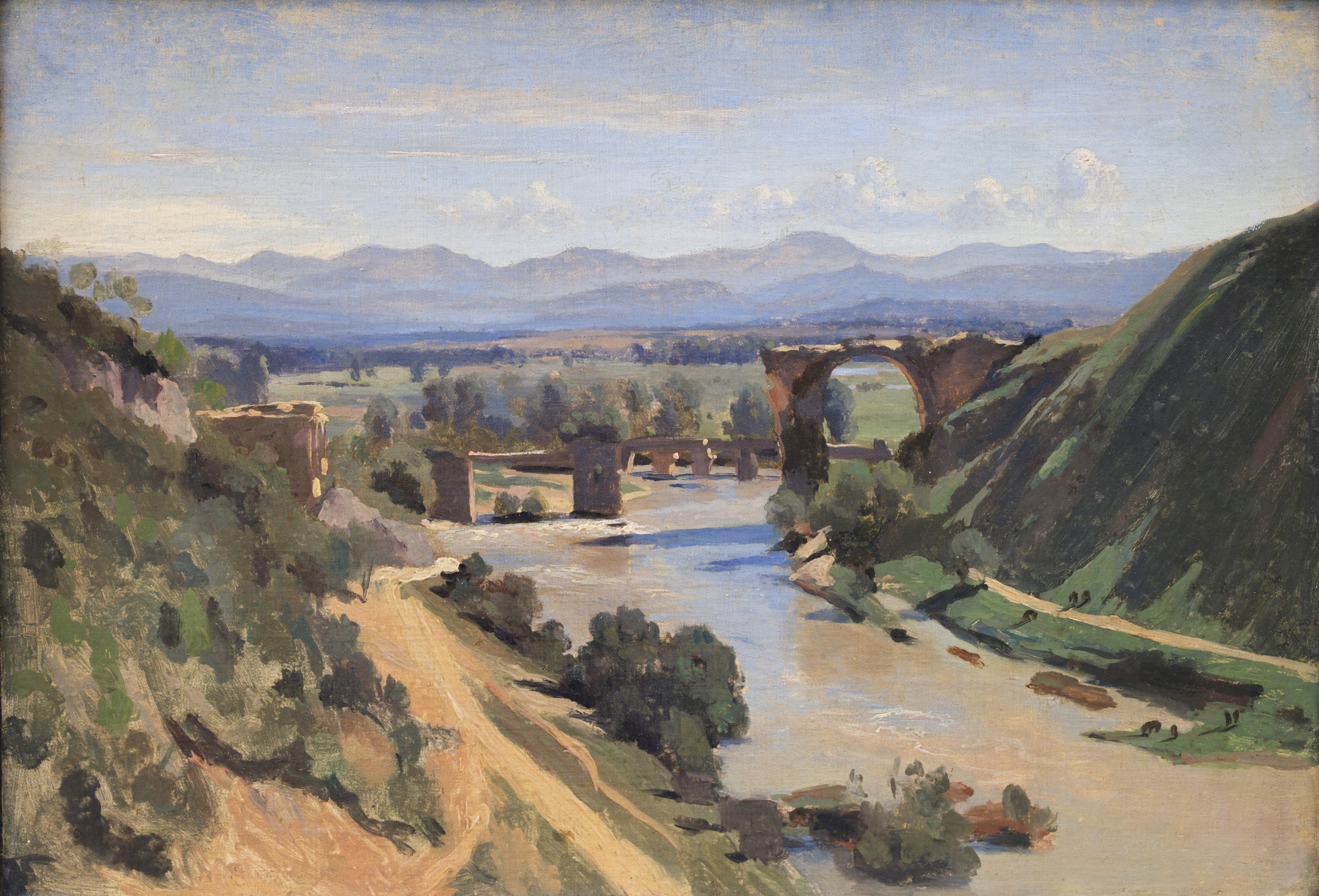
The Bridge at Narni (1826), Musée du Louvre, Paris

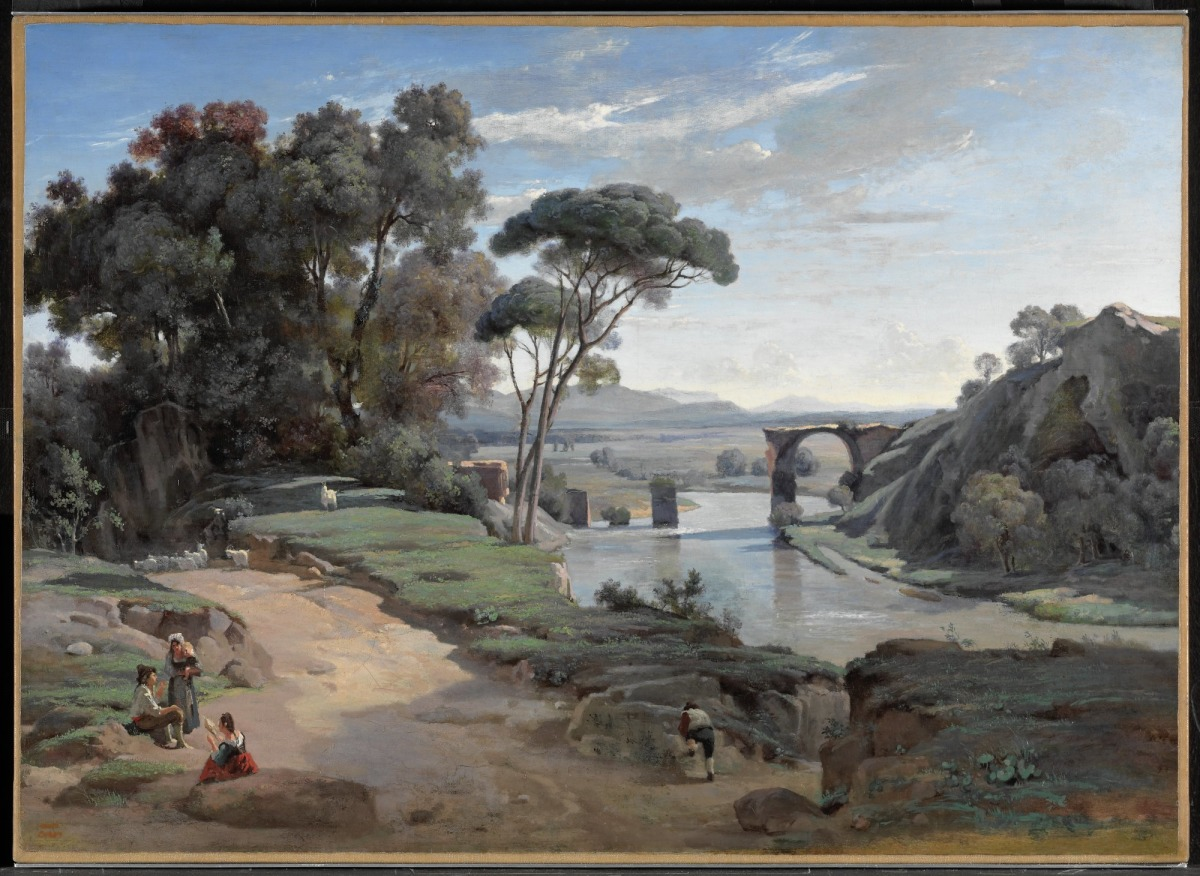
The View at Narni (1827), National Gallery of Canada, Ottawa

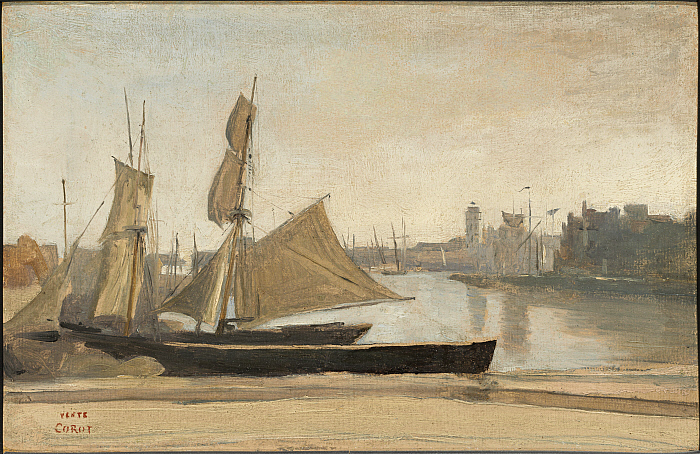
Dunkerque, Fishing Boats tied to the Wharf (1830), Clark Art Institute, Williamstown, Massachusetts

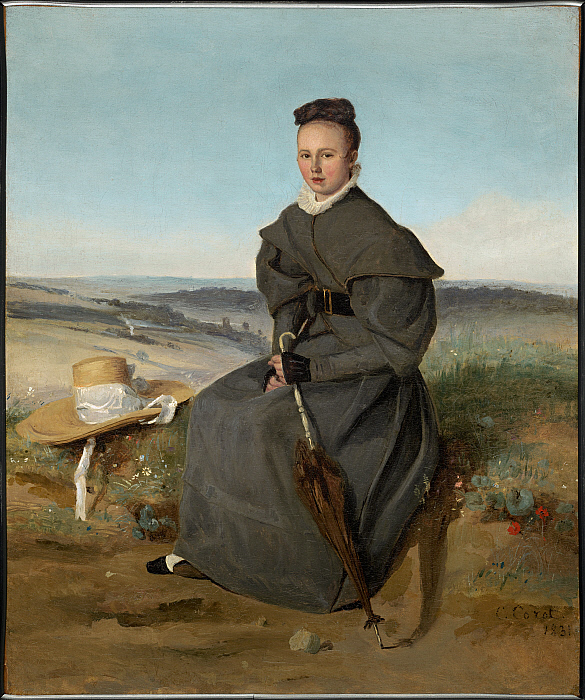
Louise Harduin (1831), Clark Art Institute, Williamstown, Massachusetts

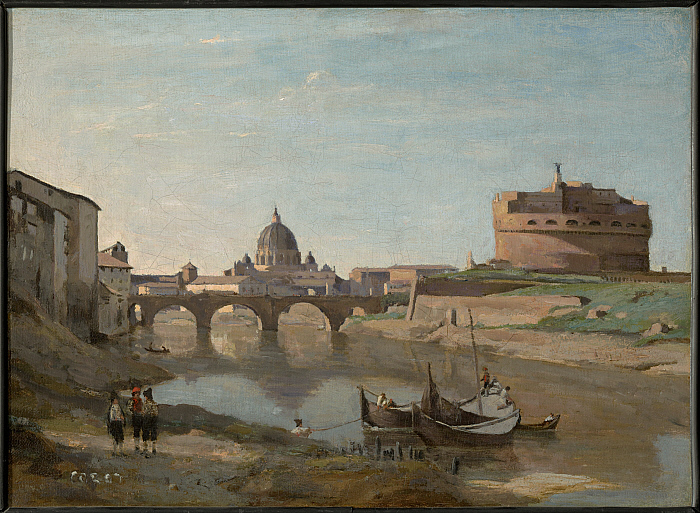
Castel Sant'Angelo, Rome (1830–32), Clark Art Institute, Williamstown, Massachusetts

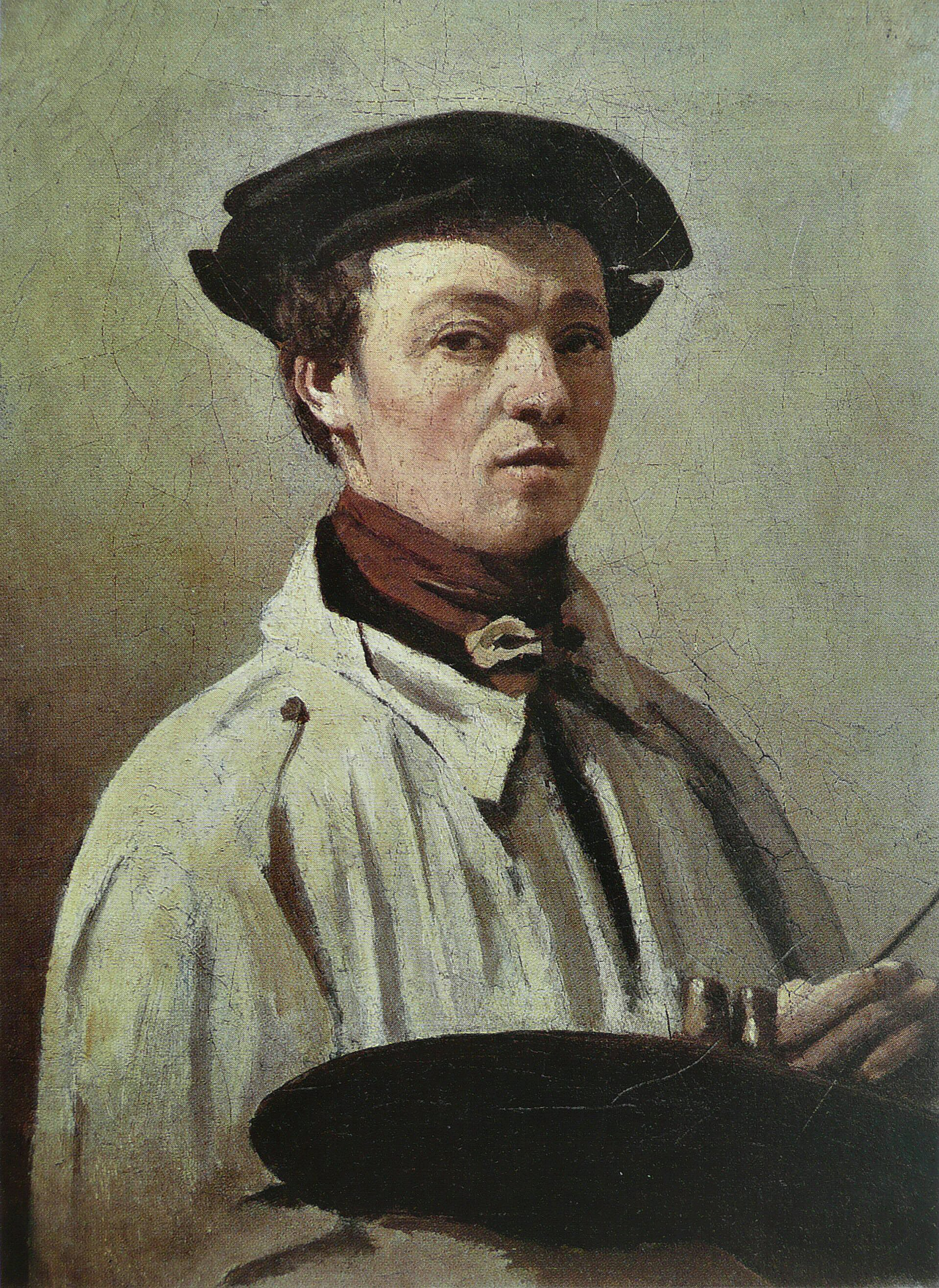
Self-portrait, (c. 1835), Uffizi Gallery, Firenze

Forest of Fontainebleau (1834), National Gallery of Art, Washington D.C.

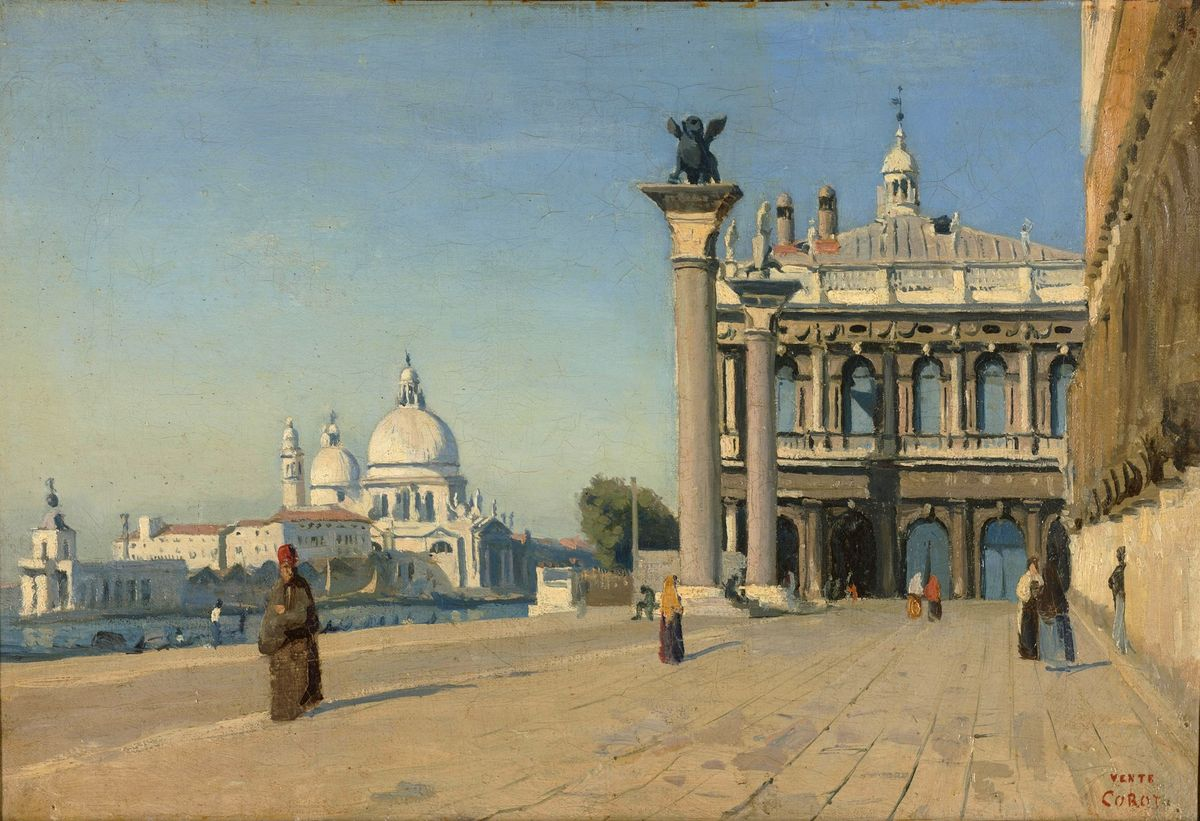
View of Venice: The Piazzetta Seen from the Riva degli Schiavoni (1834), Pushkin Museum, Moscow

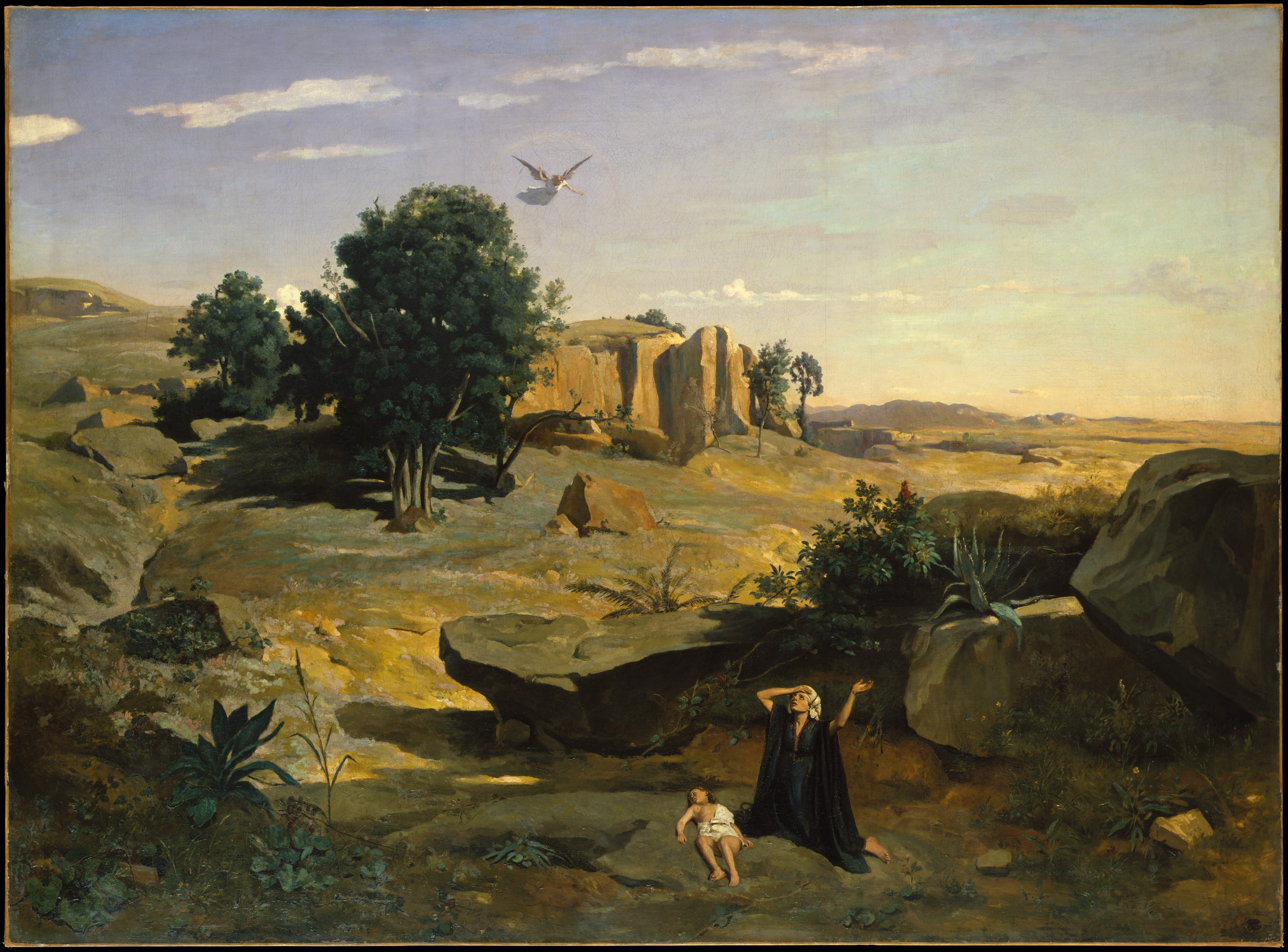
Hagar in the Wilderness (1835), Metropolitan Museum of Art, New York

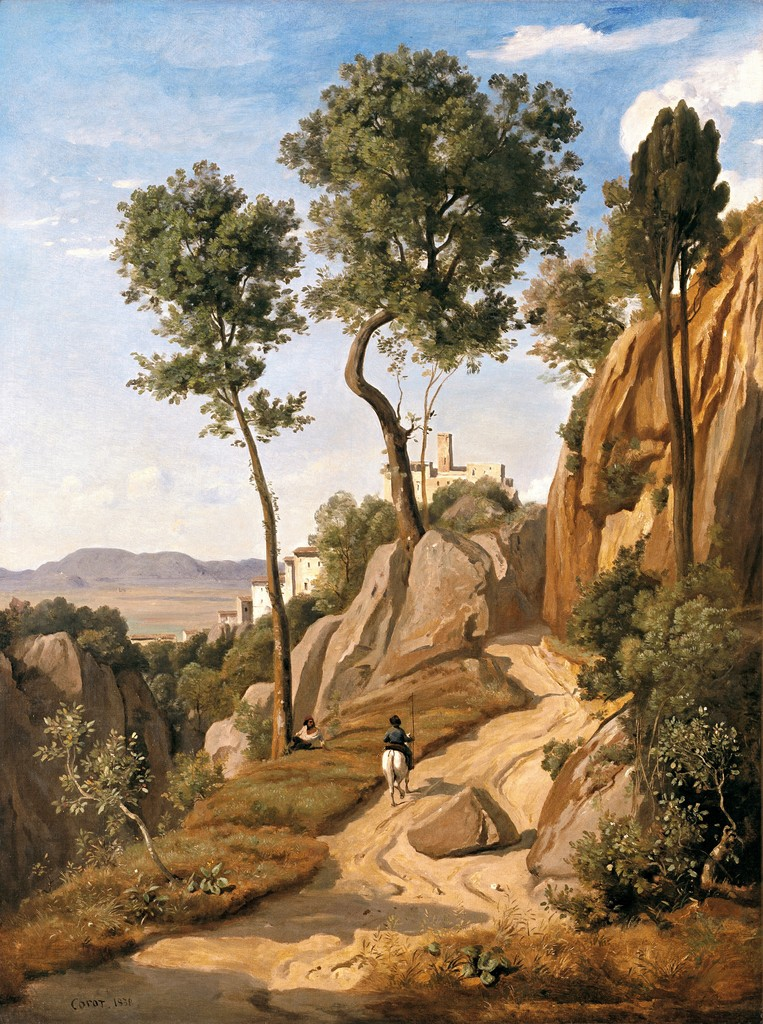
View of Volterra (1838), Timken Museum of Art, San Diego

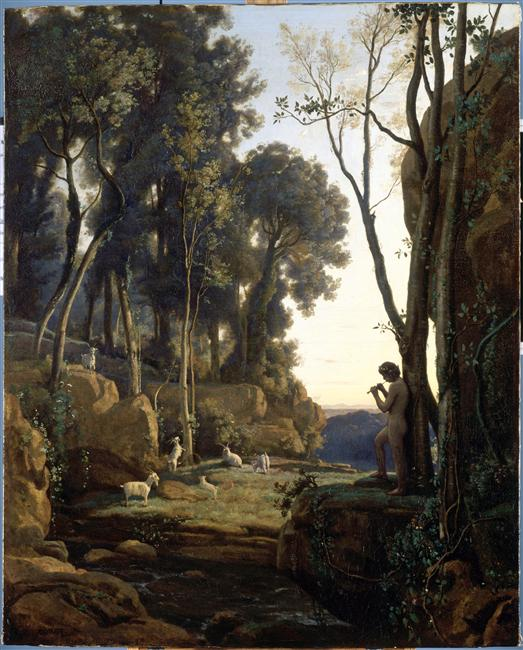
Le petit berger (1840), Musée de la Cour d'Or, Metz

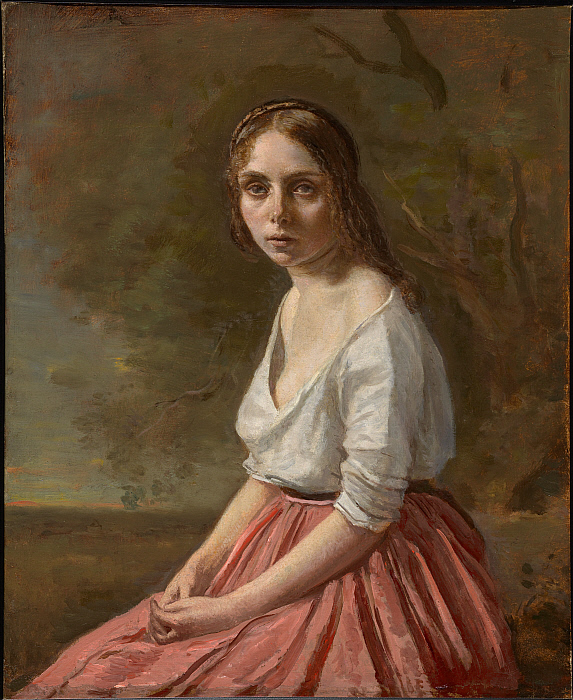
Young Woman in a Pink Skirt (1845–50), Clark Art Institute, Williamstown, Massachusetts

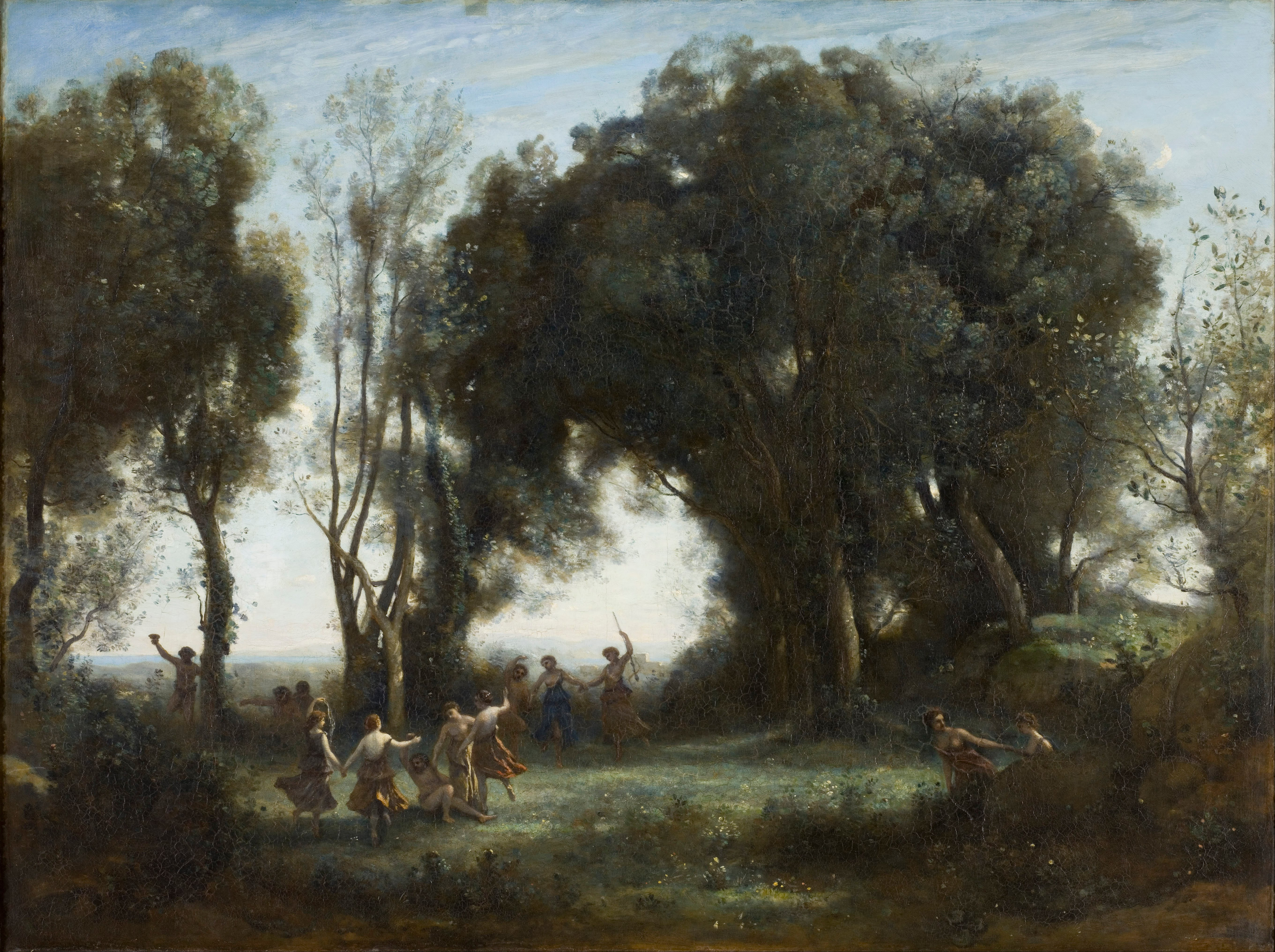
The Dance of the Nymphs (1850), Musée d'Orsay

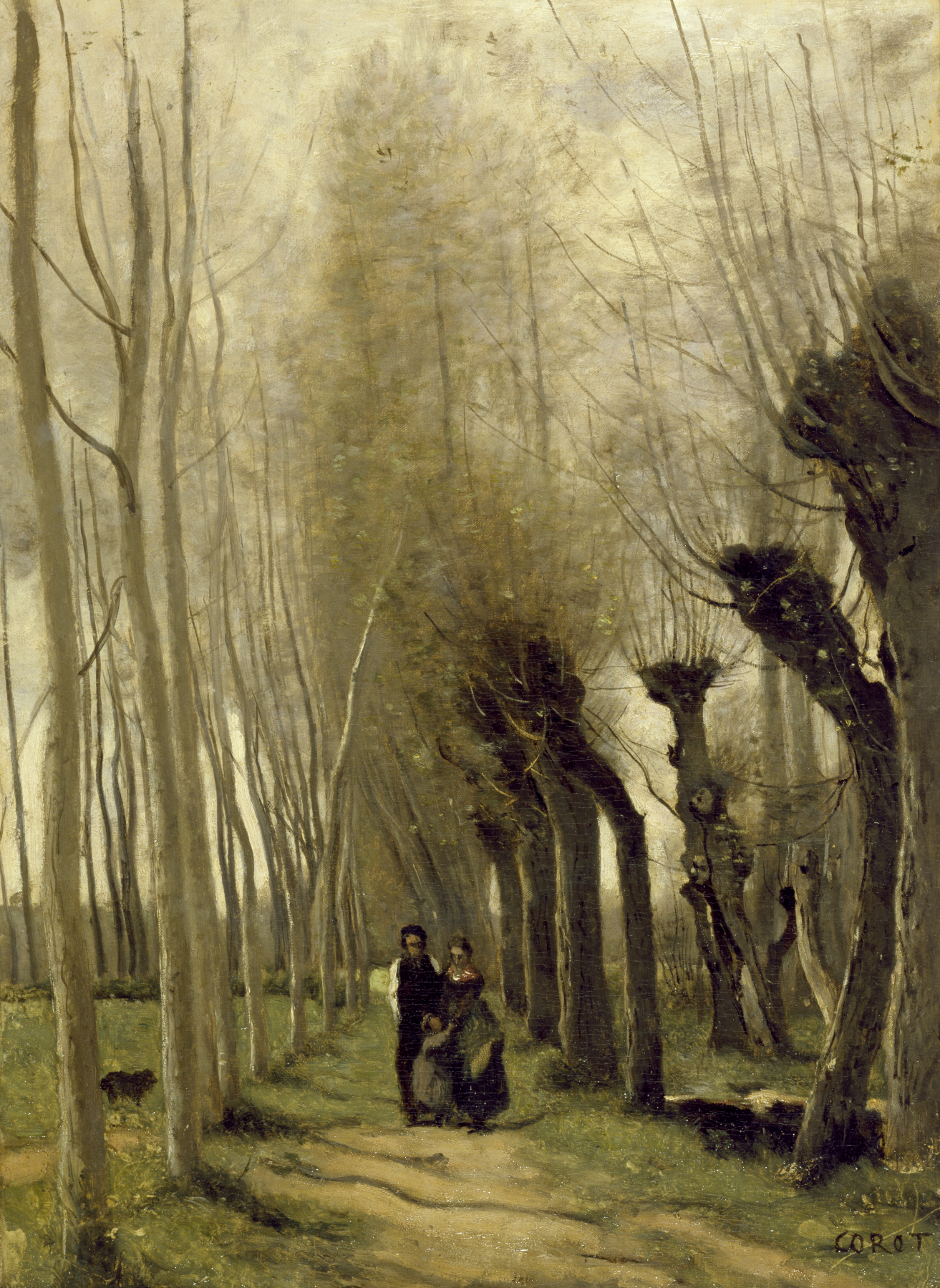
The Willows of Marissel (1857), Walters Art Gallery

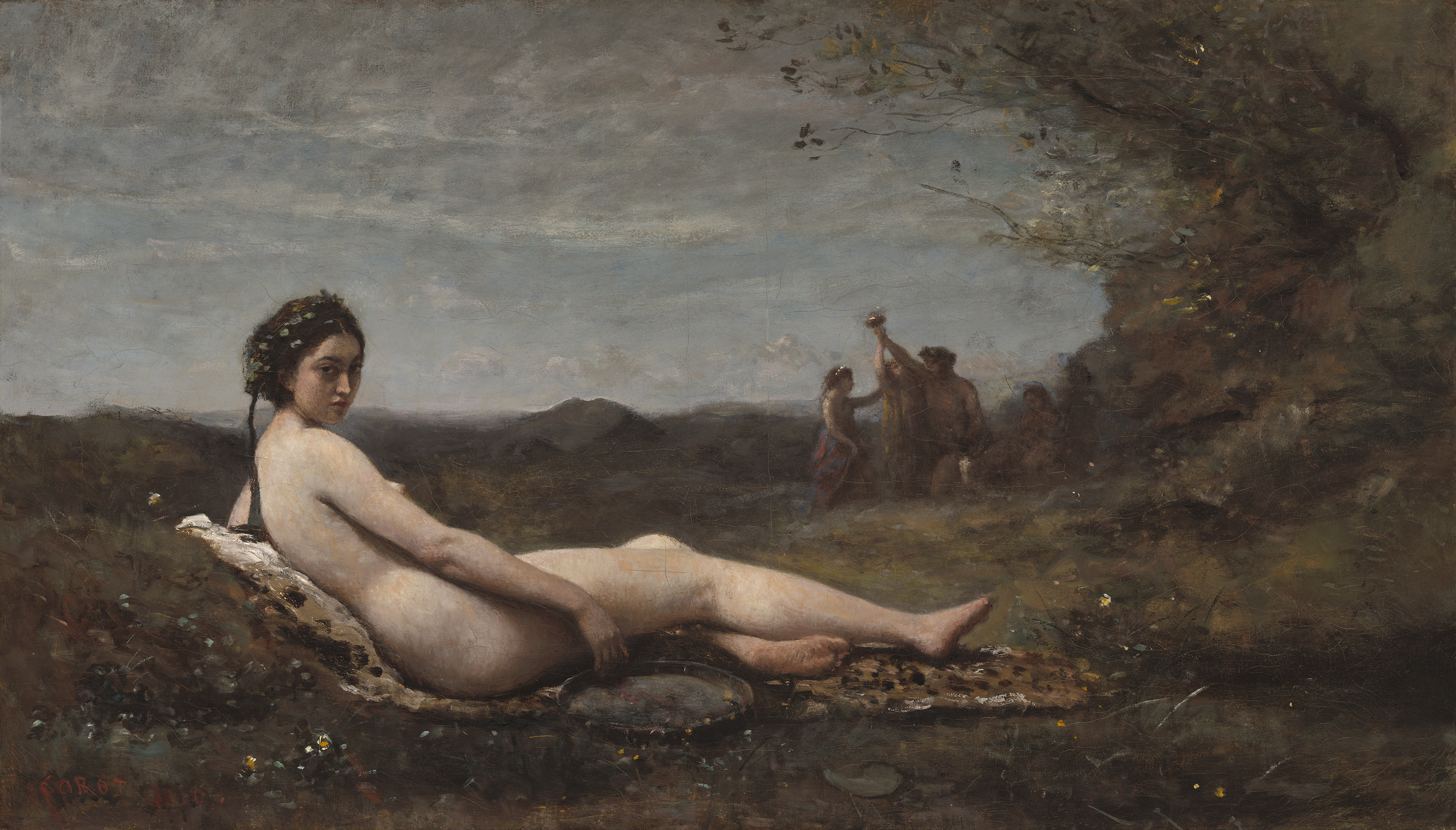
The Repose (1860), National Gallery of Art, Washington D.C.

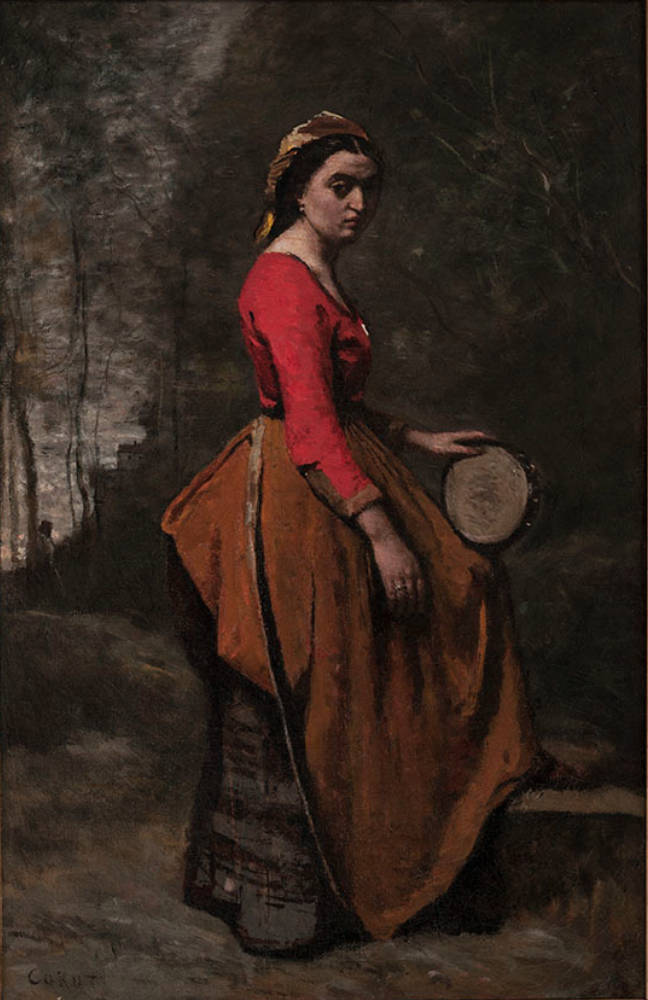
Gitane au tambourin (c. 1862), Museo Botero, Bogotá

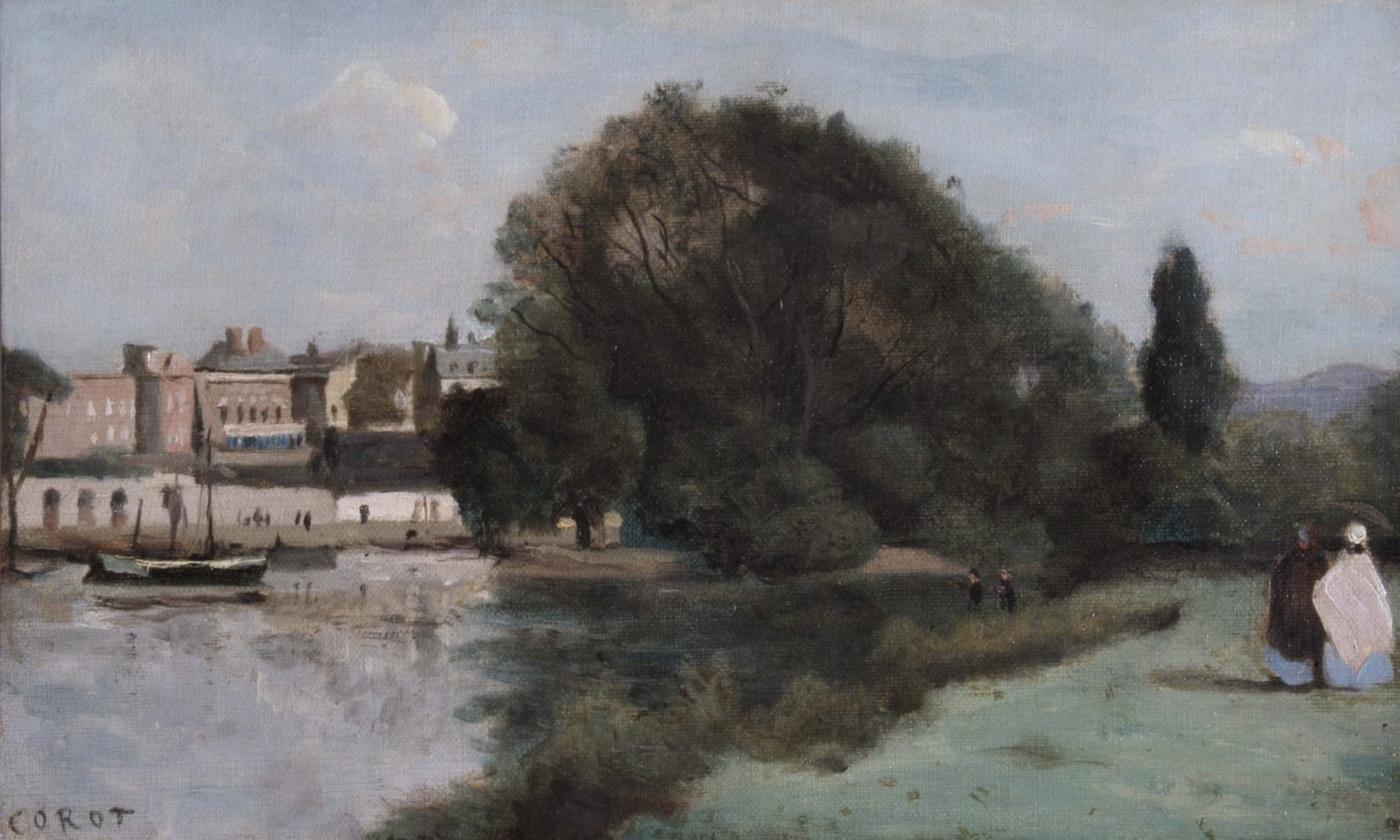
Richmond Near London (1862), Orleans House

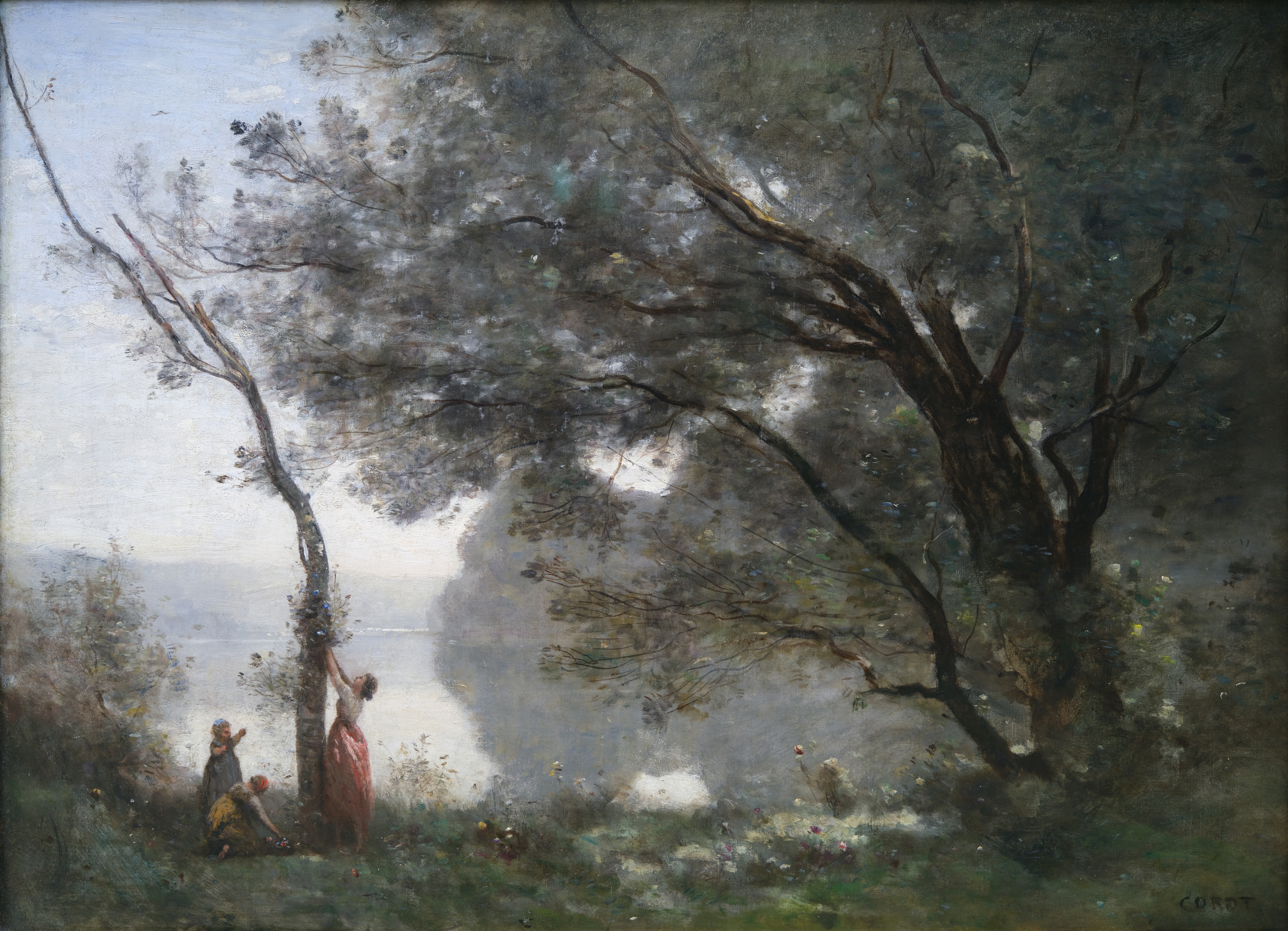
Souvenir de Mortefontaine (1864), Louvre Museum, Paris

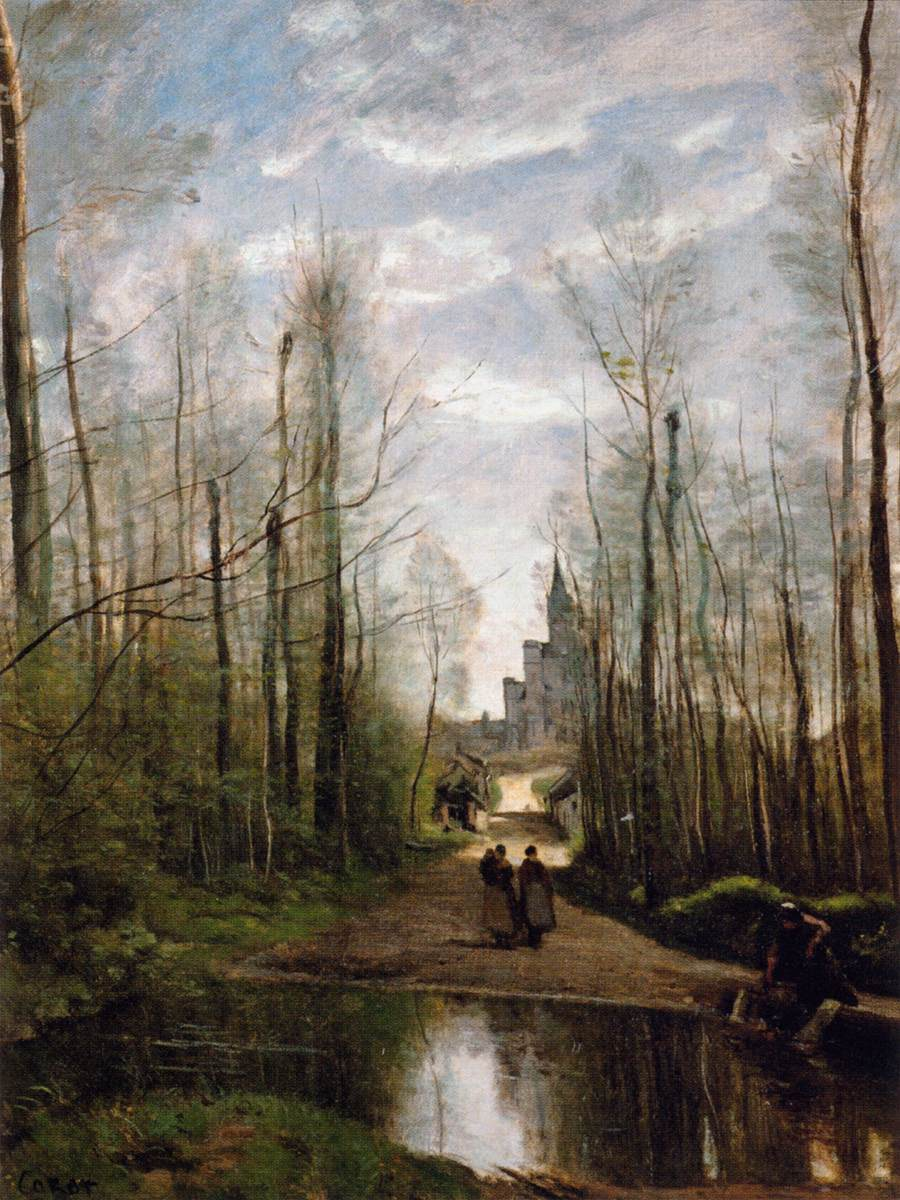
The Church of Marissel (1866), Louvre Museum, Paris

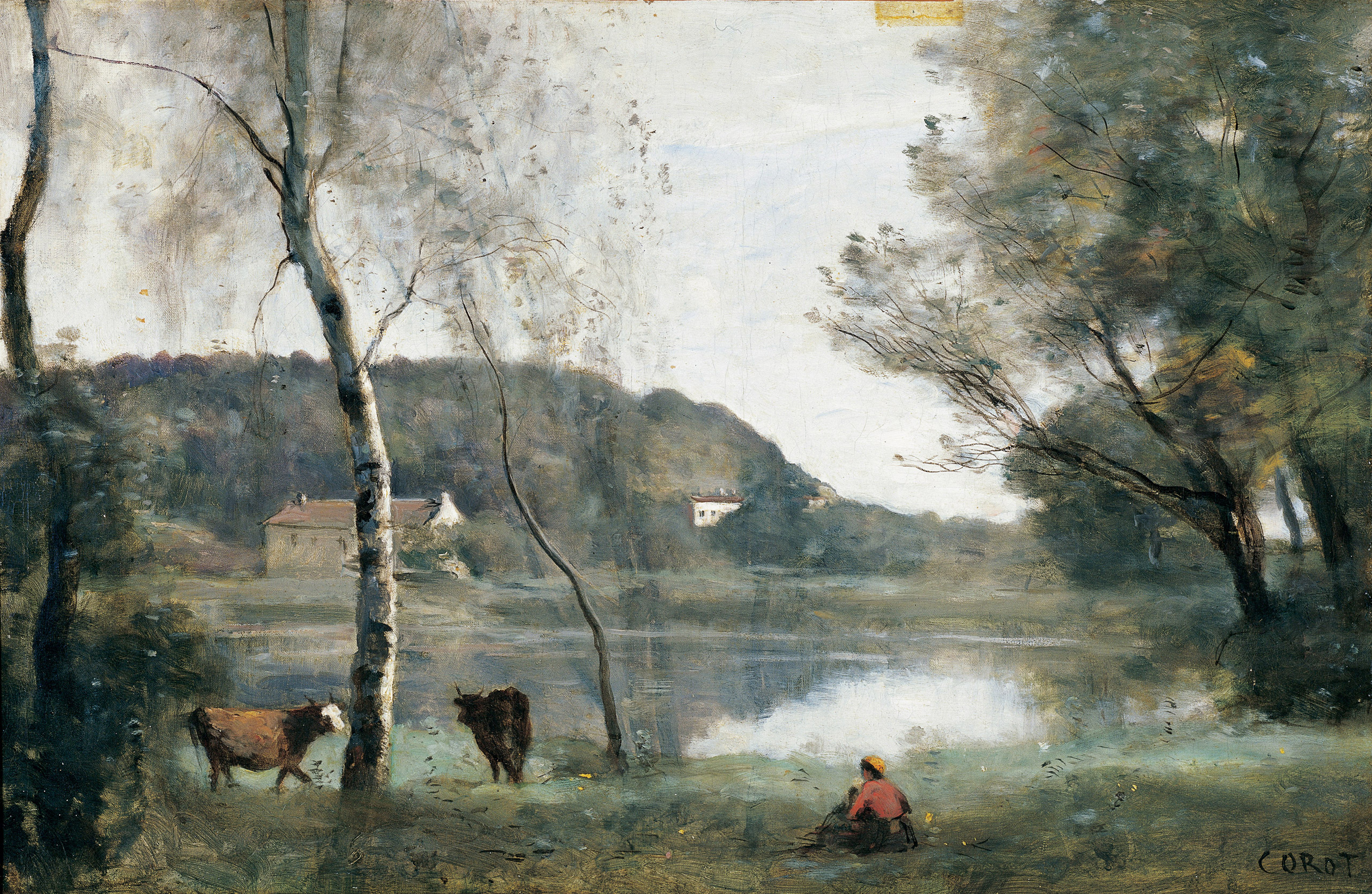
L'étang de Ville-d'Avray (c. 1865–70), National Museum of Fine Arts, Buenos Aires

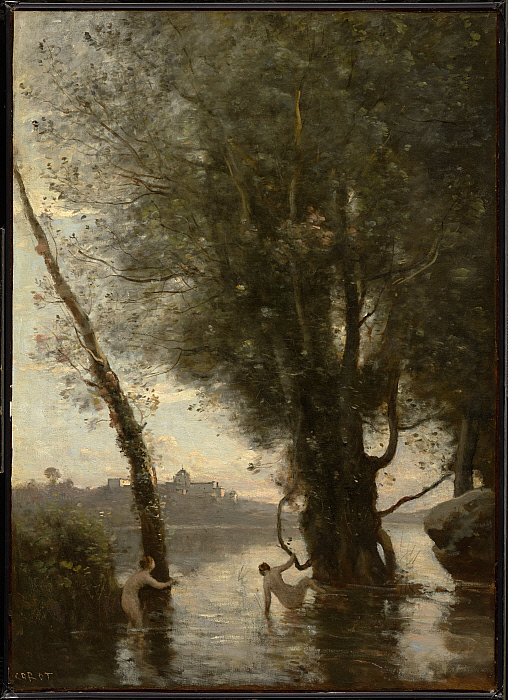
Bathers of the Borromean Isles (c. 1865–70),Clark Art Institute, Williamstown, Massachusetts

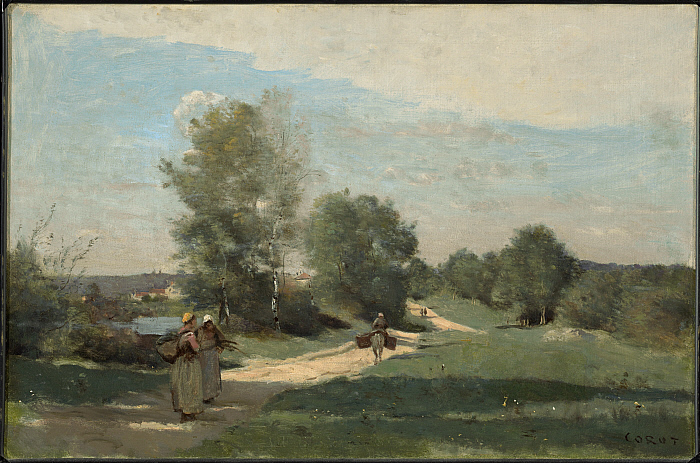
Road by the Water (c. 1865–70), Clark Art Institute, Williamstown, Massachusetts

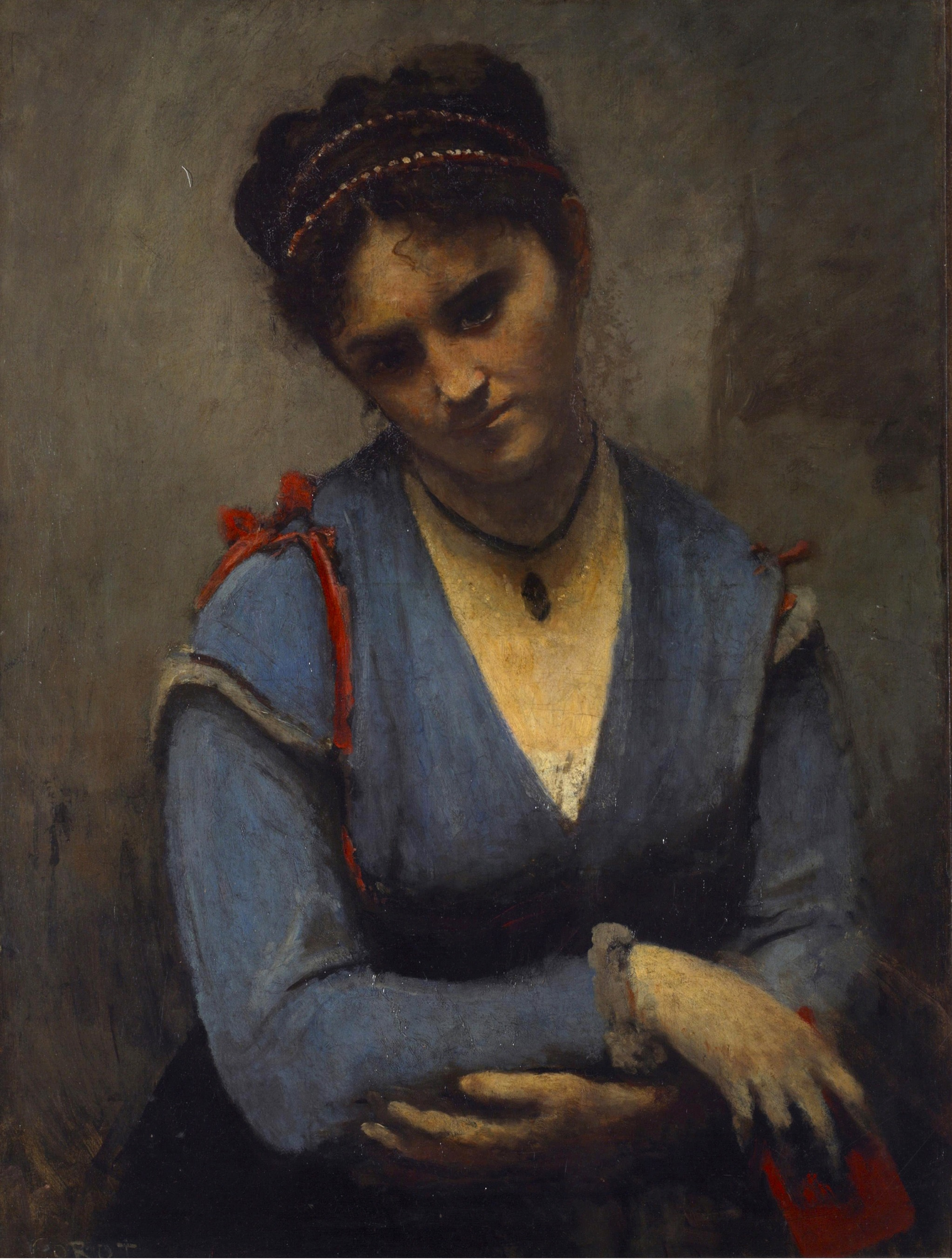
La Songerie de Mariette Gambay (1869–1870), Pushkin Museum, Moscow

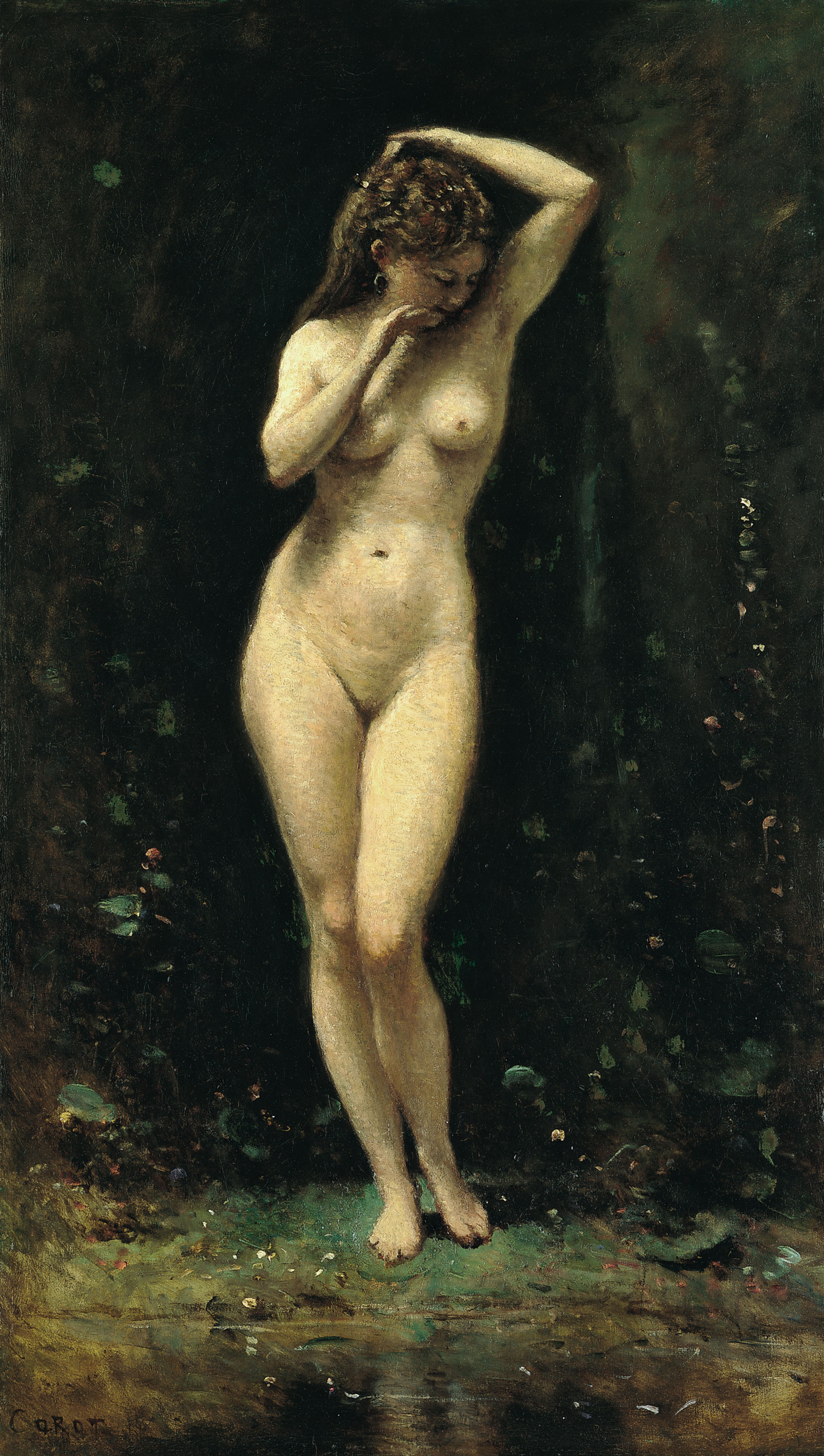
Diana Bathing (c. 1869–1870), Thyssen-Bornemisza Museum, Madrid

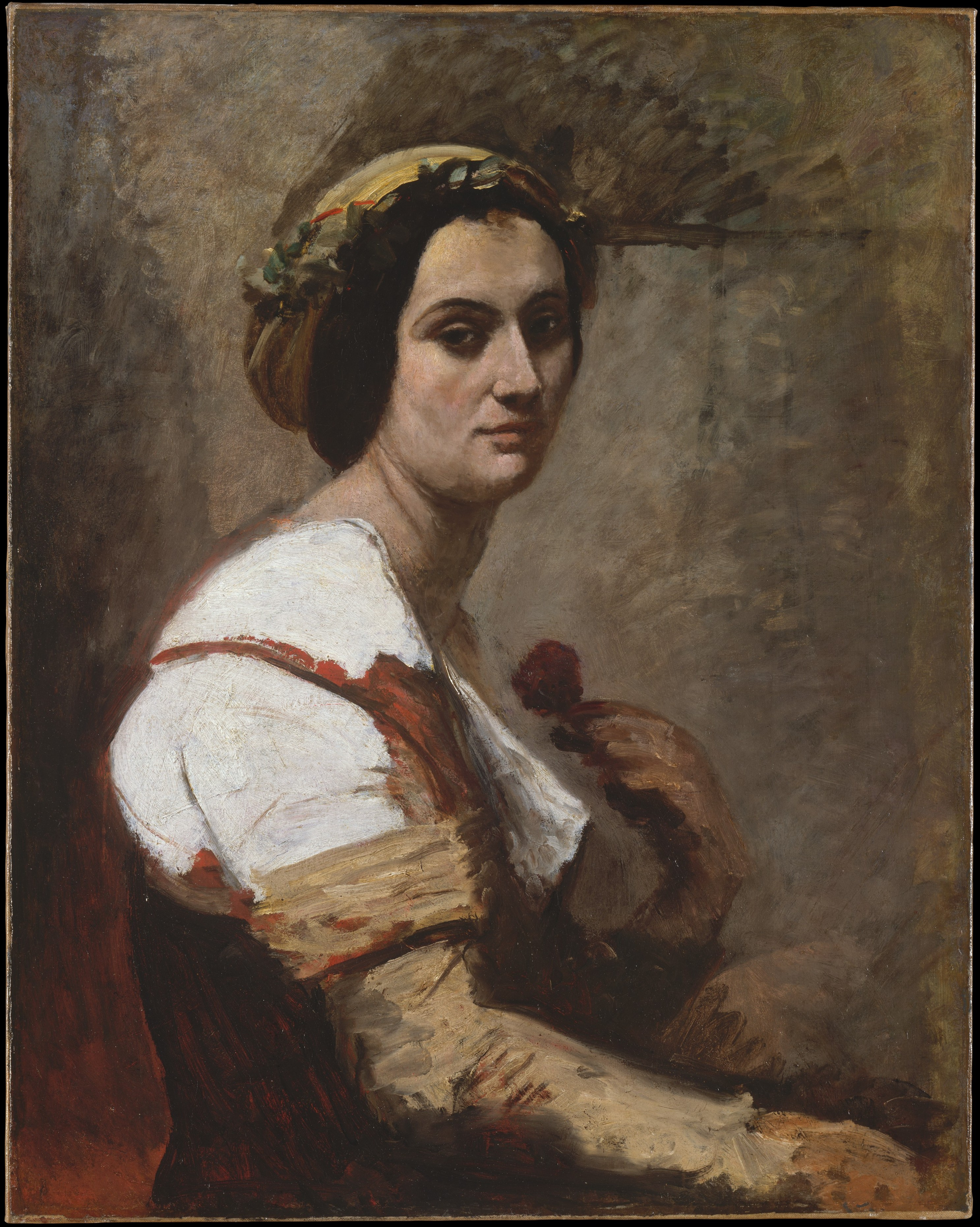
Sibylle (c. 1870), Metropolitan Museum of Art, New York

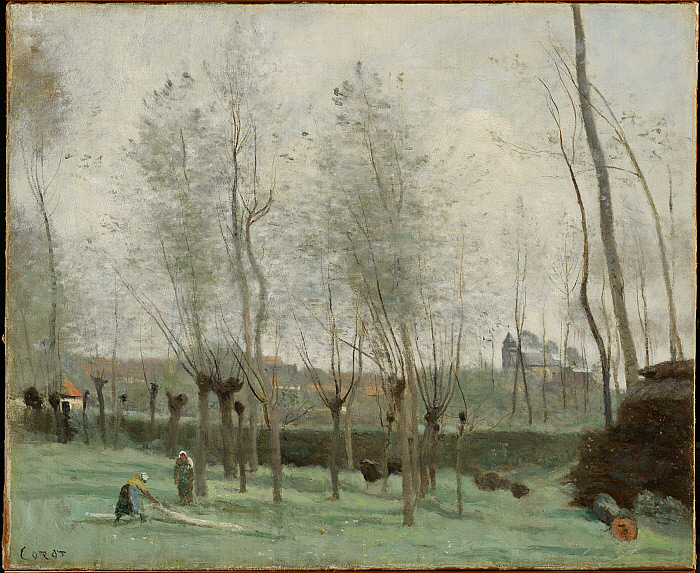
Washerwomen in a Willow Grove (1871), Clark Art Institute, Williamstown, Massachusetts

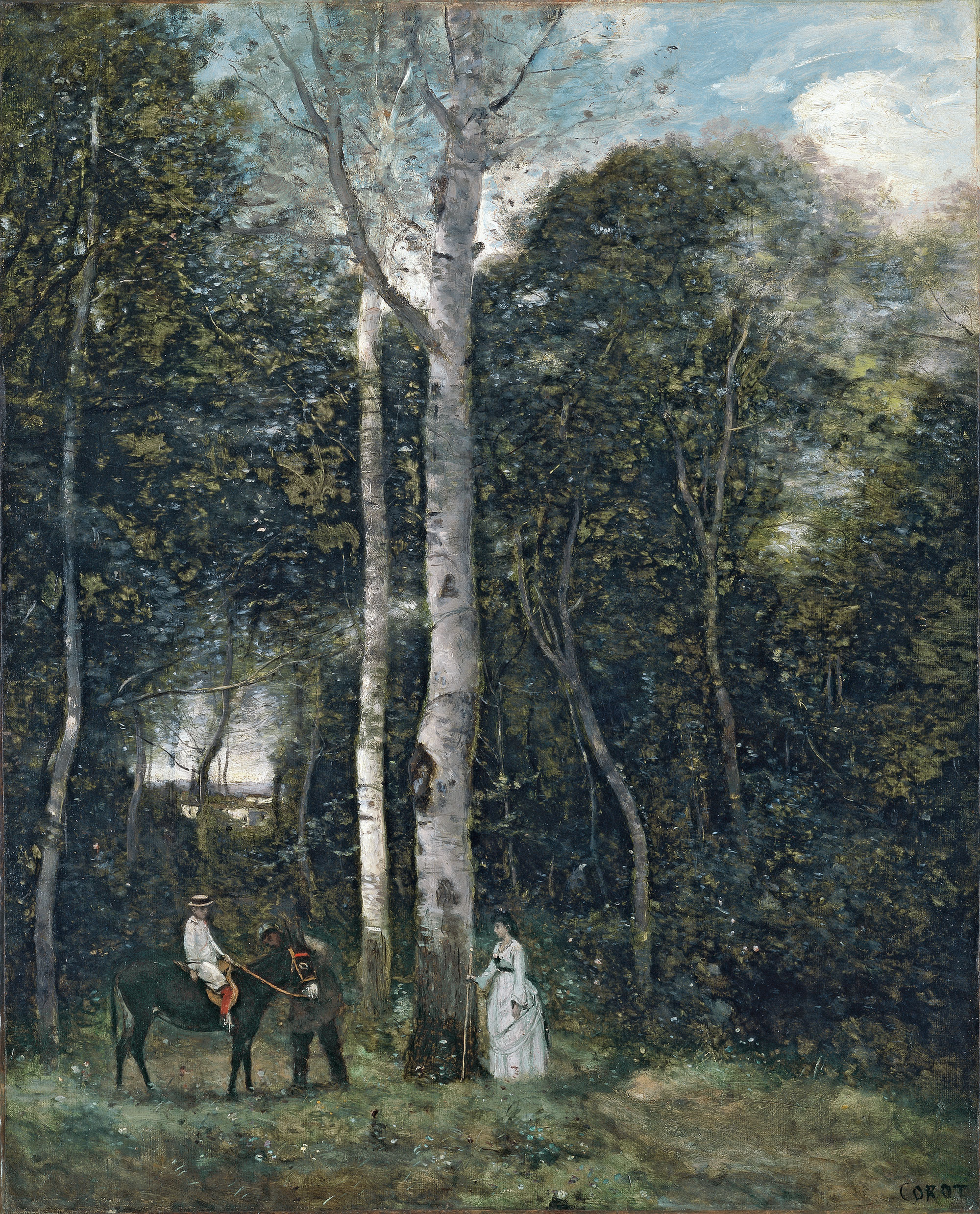
Le Parc des Lions à Port-Marly (1872), Thyssen-Bornemisza Museum, Madrid

== See also ==
- Effets de soir
- History of painting
- List of Orientalist artists
- Orientalism
- Western painting
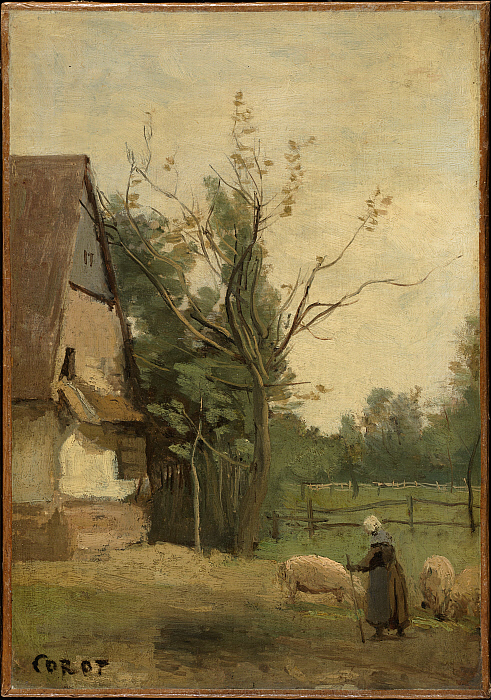
Barnyard Scene (19th Century), oil on canvas, 13 7/16 x 9 7/16 in. (34.2 x 24 cm), Imitator of Jean-Baptiste-Camille Corot, Clark Art Institute

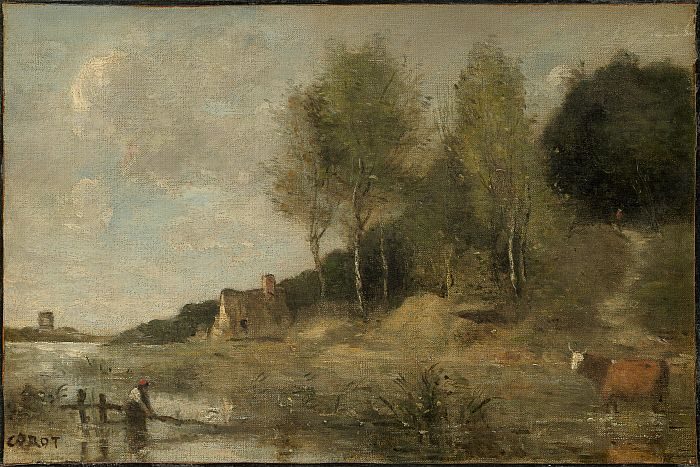
Marsh at Bove, near Amiens (19th century), oil on canvas, 9 7/16 x 13 7/8 in. (24 x 35.3 cm), Imitator of Jean-Baptiste-Camille Corot, Clark Art Institute

== Notes and references ==
=== References ===
- Clark, Kenneth (1991). Landscape into Art. New York: HarperCollins. ISBN 0-06-010781-2.
- Leymarie, J (1979). Corot. Discovering the nineteenth century. Geneva: Skira. ISBN 0-8478-0238-8.
- Tinterow, Gary; Pantazzi, Michael; Pomarède, Vincent (1996). Corot (catalogue exhibition). New York: Metropolitan Museum of Art. ISBN 0-87099-769-6.
- Dumas, Bertrand (2005). Trésors des églises parisiennes (in French). Paris: éditions Parigramme. pp. 104–105. ISBN 2-84096-359-0.
