= A Woman Reading =

Painting by Jean-Baptiste-Camille Corot

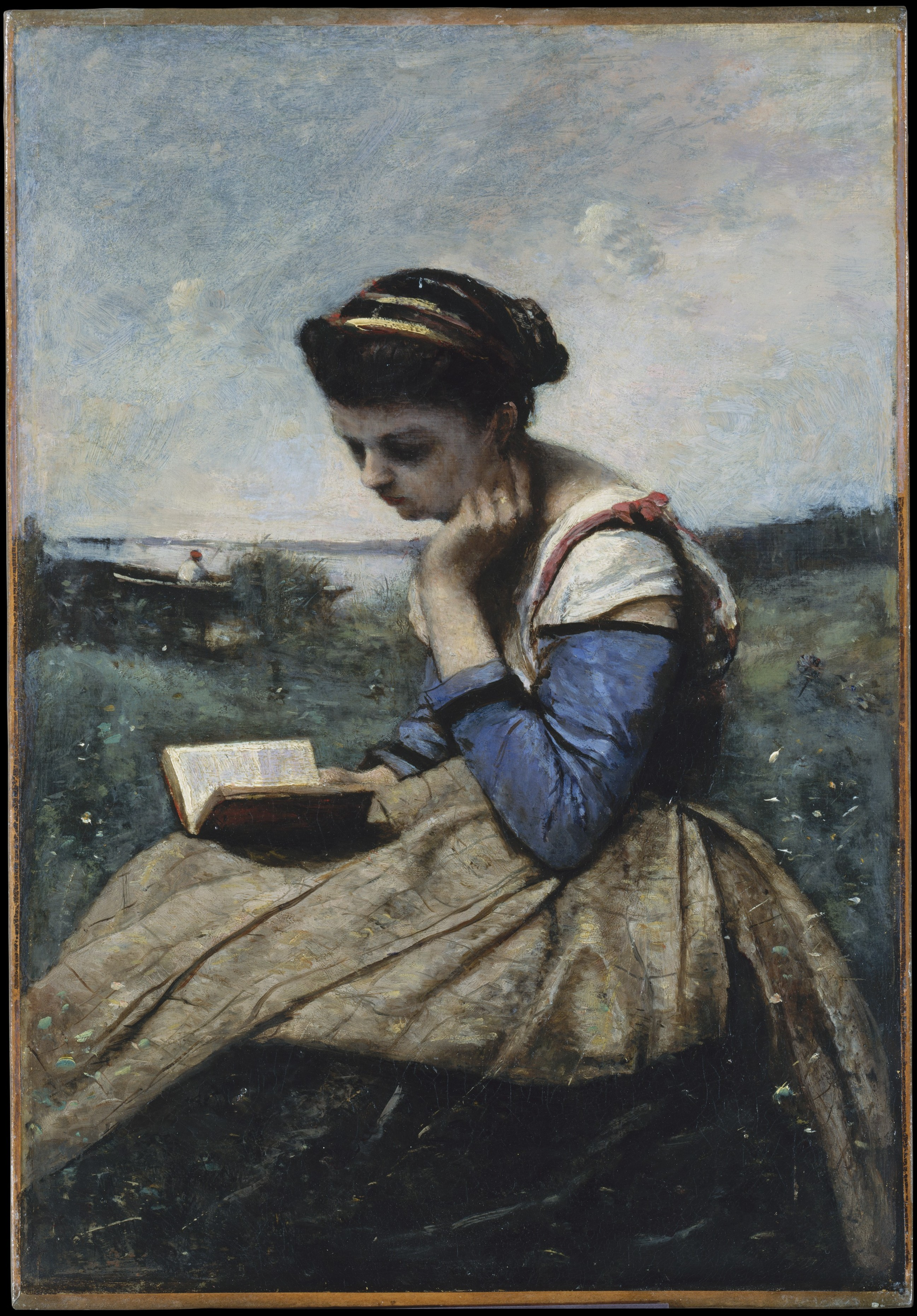
- Artist: Jean-Baptiste-Camille Corot
- Year: 1869
- Medium: oil on canvas
- Dimensions: 54.3 cm × 37.5 cm (21.4 in × 14.8 in)
- Location: Metropolitan Museum of Art; New York

A Woman Reading is an oil-on-canvas painting by French artist Jean-Baptiste-Camille Corot, created in 1869. The painting is in the Metropolitan Museum of Art, in New York.

== History and description ==
The painting depicts a woman seatead in the countryside, in open air, reading a book. She seems to be immersed in the reading of the book that she has on her lap. In the distance to her left there is a river, where can be seen a man in a boat. The green field and the blue cloudy sky, divide the painting's background almost at half size. Corot, whose reputation was made as a landscape painter, painted many images of solitary, pensive women in his later years. Femme Lisant, which was shown at the Salon of 1869, is the only one of them that he exhibited in his lifetime.

When the 72-year-old painter exhibited the canvas at the Salon in 1869, Théophile Gautier praised the sincere naivete and palette of the painting, but criticized the heroine's clumsy drawing, noting the few figures in the artists work. After the Salon, Corot returned to the canvas, remodeling the landscape, but, ignoring criticism, left the figure unchanged.

== Provenance ==
The painting was donated to the Metropolitan Museum of Art in 1928 by Louise Senff Cameron, in memory of her uncle Charles H. Senff.
