= Christopher Columbus Explaining His Intended Voyage =

Painting by David Wilkie

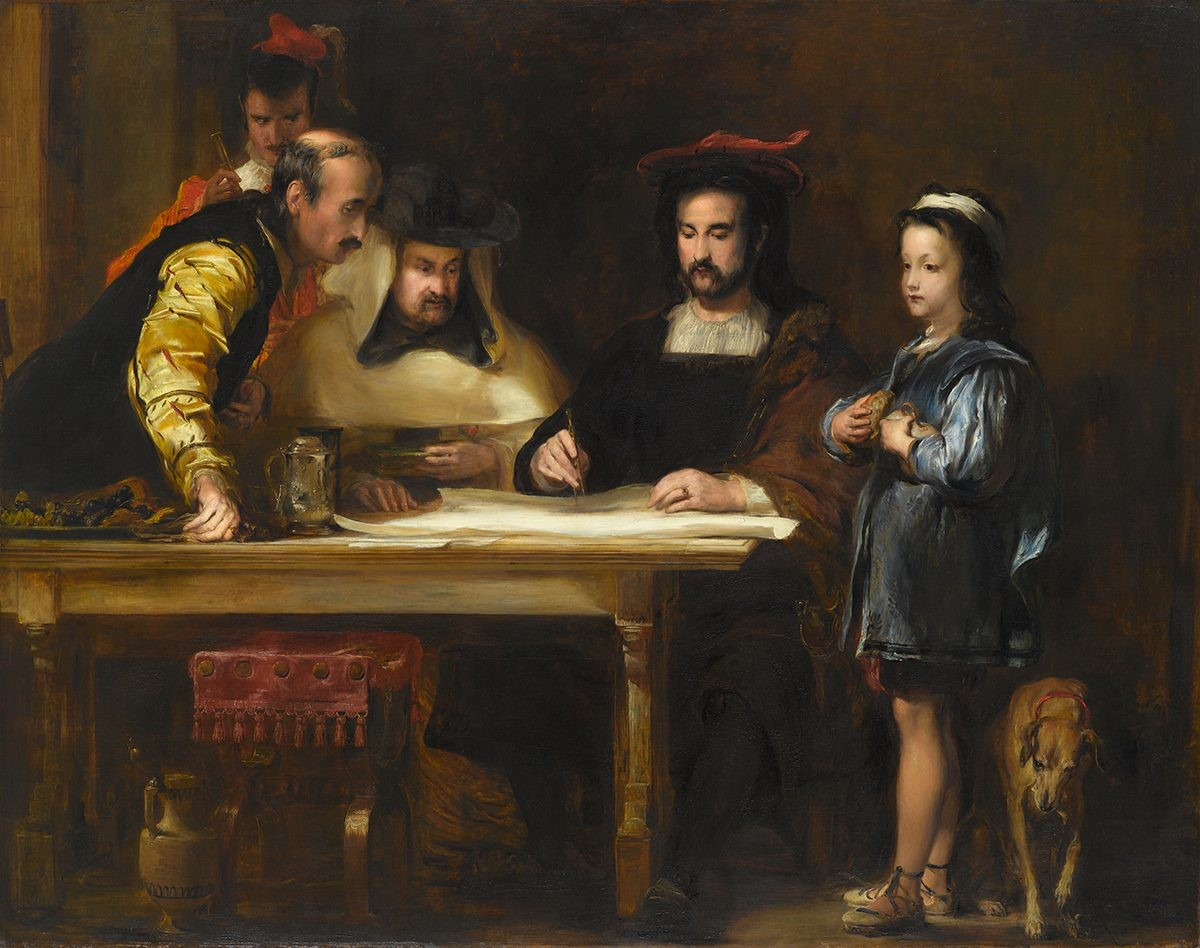
- Artist: David Wilkie
- Year: 1834
- Type: Oil on canvas, history painting
- Dimensions: 148.6 cm × 188.6 cm (58.5 in × 74.3 in)
- Location: North Carolina Museum of Art, Raleigh

Christopher Columbus Explaining His Intended Voyage is an 1834 history painting by the British artist David Wilkie. It is held in the collection of the North Carolina Museum of Art in Raleigh.

== History and description ==
It depicts a scene in 1485 at the La Rábida Friary in Huelva when the explorer Christopher Columbus sets out his plans to reach Asia by sailing westwards. Departing seven years later he was instead to land in the Americas, a major moment in the Age of Discovery. It is also known by the longer title Christopher Columbus in the Convent of La Rabida Explaining His Intended Voyage.

Wilkie had visited Spain in the late 1820s, where he had met and befriended the American author Washington Irving. The painting was inspired by a passage from Irving's biography of Christopher Columbus. Having failed in an attempt to gain backing in Portugal for his planned voyage, Columbus arrived in Spain with his young son Diego to seek patronage. The support and backing from the prior Juan Pérez proved a turning point in securing the eventual backing of Queen Isabella.

It contains a notable anachronism. In the background the navigator Martín Alonso Pinzón holds a telescope, an instrument that had not been invented in the fifteenth century. The composition of the painting was inspired by Supper at Emmaus by Titian. It was displayed at the Royal Academy's Summer Exhibition of 1835 at Somerset House, and was the last in his phase of Spanish-themed subjects.

== Bibliography ==
- Bowron, Edgar Peters. The North Carolina Museum of Art: Introduction to the Collections. North Carolina Museum of Art, 1983.
- Bury, Stephen (ed.) Benezit Dictionary of British Graphic Artists and Illustrators, Volume 1. OUP, 2012.
- Tromans, Nicholas. David Wilkie: The People's Painter. Edinburgh University Press, 2007.
