= The Chivalric Vow of the Ladies of the Peacock =

Painting by Daniel Maclise

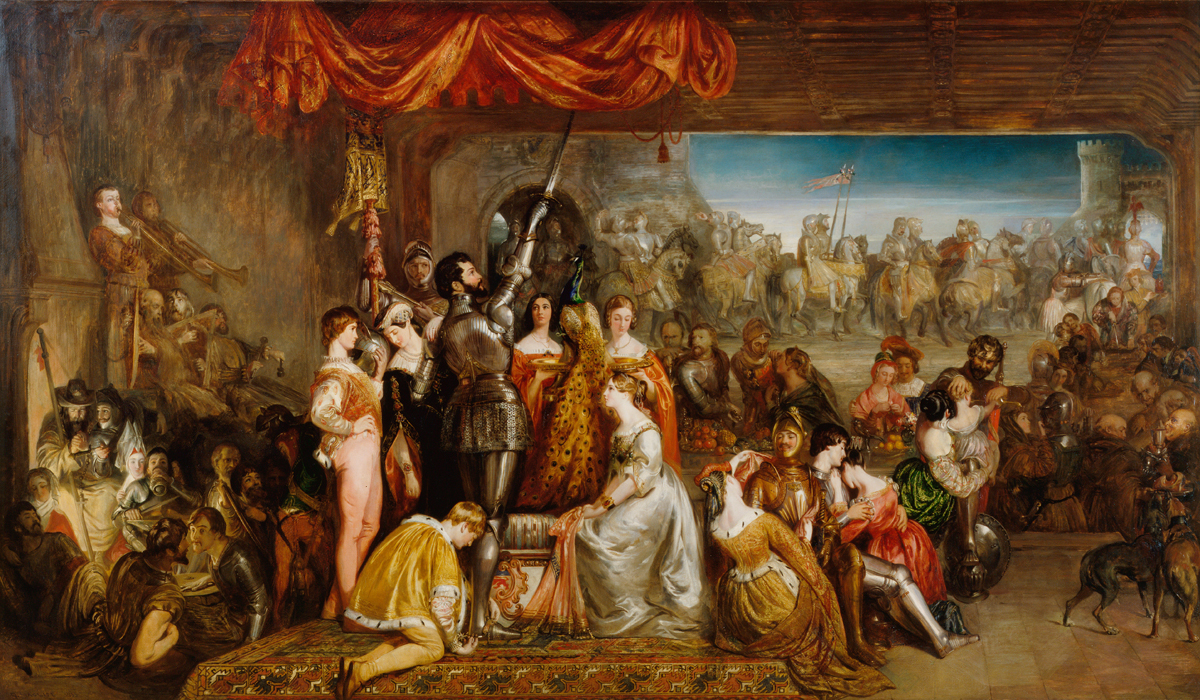
- Artist: Daniel Maclise
- Year: 1835
- Type: Oil on canvas, history painting
- Dimensions: 169 cm × 292 cm (67 in × 115 in)
- Location: Government Art Collection

The Chivalric Vow of the Ladies of the Peacock is an 1835 history painting by the Irish artist Daniel Maclise. Depicting a banquet scene, It draws inspiration by the Medieval epic poem Vows of the Peacockby Jacques de Longuyon and a passage from Sir Walter Scott's 1805 poem The Lay of the Last Minstrel.

The work was displayed at the Royal Academy Exhibition of 1835 at Somerset House in London. Maclise went on to become a noted artist of the Victorian era, celebrated for his The Death of Nelson. Today the painting is in the Government Art Collection, having been acquired in 1977.

== Bibliography ==
- Hilton, Boyd. A Mad, Bad, and Dangerous People? England 1783-1846. Oxford University Press, 2008.
- Murray, Peter. Daniel Maclise, 1806-1870: Romancing the Past. University of Michigan, 2008. .
- Weston, Nancy. Daniel Maclise: Irish Artist in Victorian London. Four Courts Press, 2001.
