= Line Fishing, Off Hastings =

Painting by J. M. W. Turner

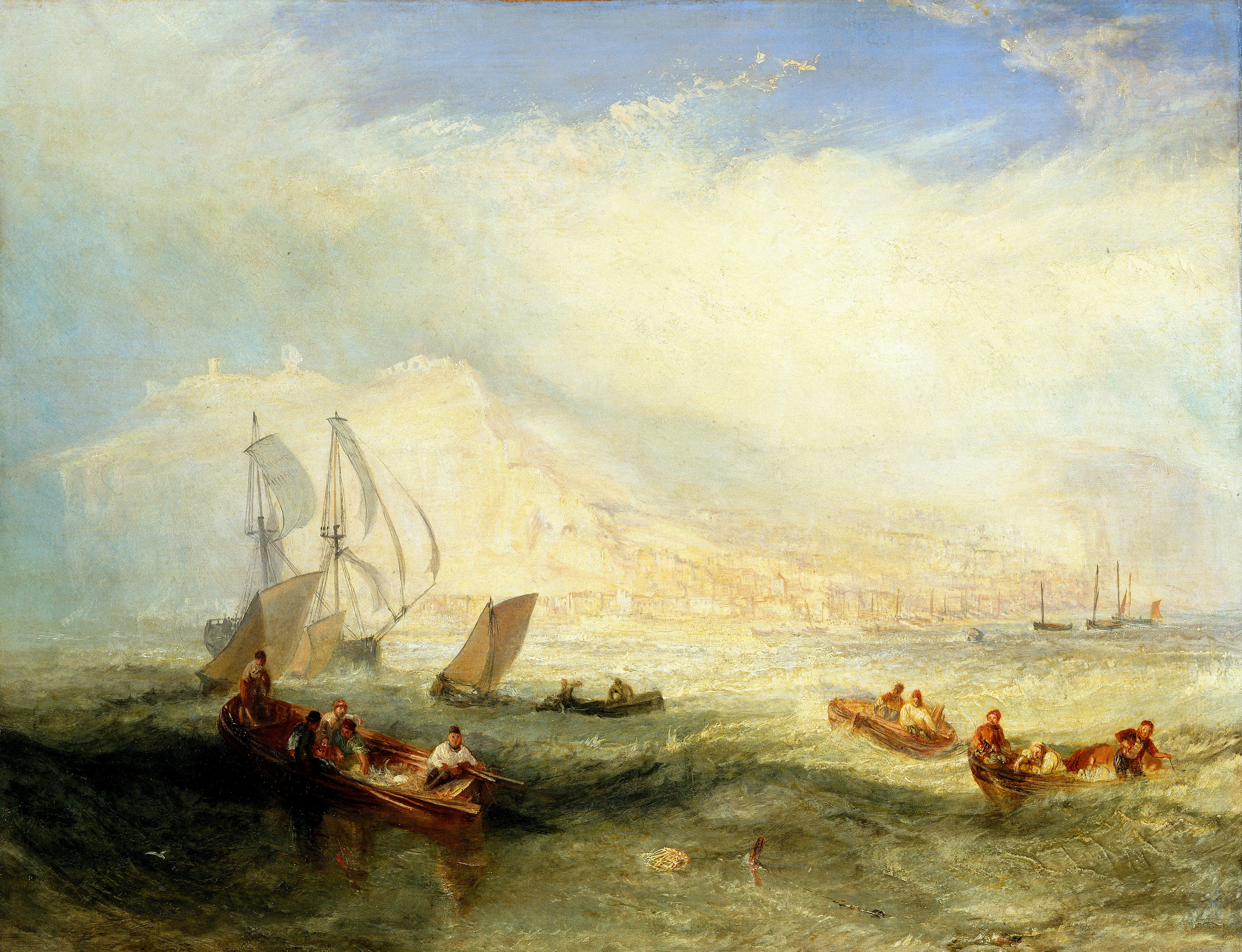
- Artist: J. M. W. Turner
- Year: c.1835
- Medium: Oil on canvas
- Dimensions: 58.4 cm × 76.2 cm (23.0 in × 30.0 in)
- Location: Victoria and Albert Museum, London
- Accession: FA.207[O]
- Website: collections.vam.ac.uk/item/O82565/line-fishing-off-hastings-oil-painting-turner-joseph-mallord/

Line Fishing, Off Hastings is an 1835 maritime painting by the British artist J.M.W. Turner. It depicts a scene off the port of Hastings in the English Channel. Fishing boats are engaged in handline fishing. West Cliff is prominent on the background. Turner has visited the area around 1816 and sketched the scene, producing a watercolour based on it a couple of years later.

It was displayed at the Royal Academy's Summer Exhibition of 1835 at Somerset House. Today the painting is in the collection of the Victoria and Albert Museum, having been donated by John Sheepshanks in 1857 as part of the Sheepshanks Gift. William Miller later produced an engraving based on the painting, a version of which is now in the collection of the Tate Gallery.

== See also ==
- List of paintings by J. M. W. Turner

== Bibliography ==
- Abse, John. The Art Galleries of Britain and Ireland: A Guide to Their Collections. Robson, 1985.
- Bailey, Anthony. J.M.W. Turner: Standing in the Sun. Tate Enterprises Ltd, 2013.
- Finberg, Alexander Joseph. In Venice with Turner. Cotswold Gallery, 1930.
