= Venice, from the Porch of Madonna della Salute =

Painting by J. M. W. Turner

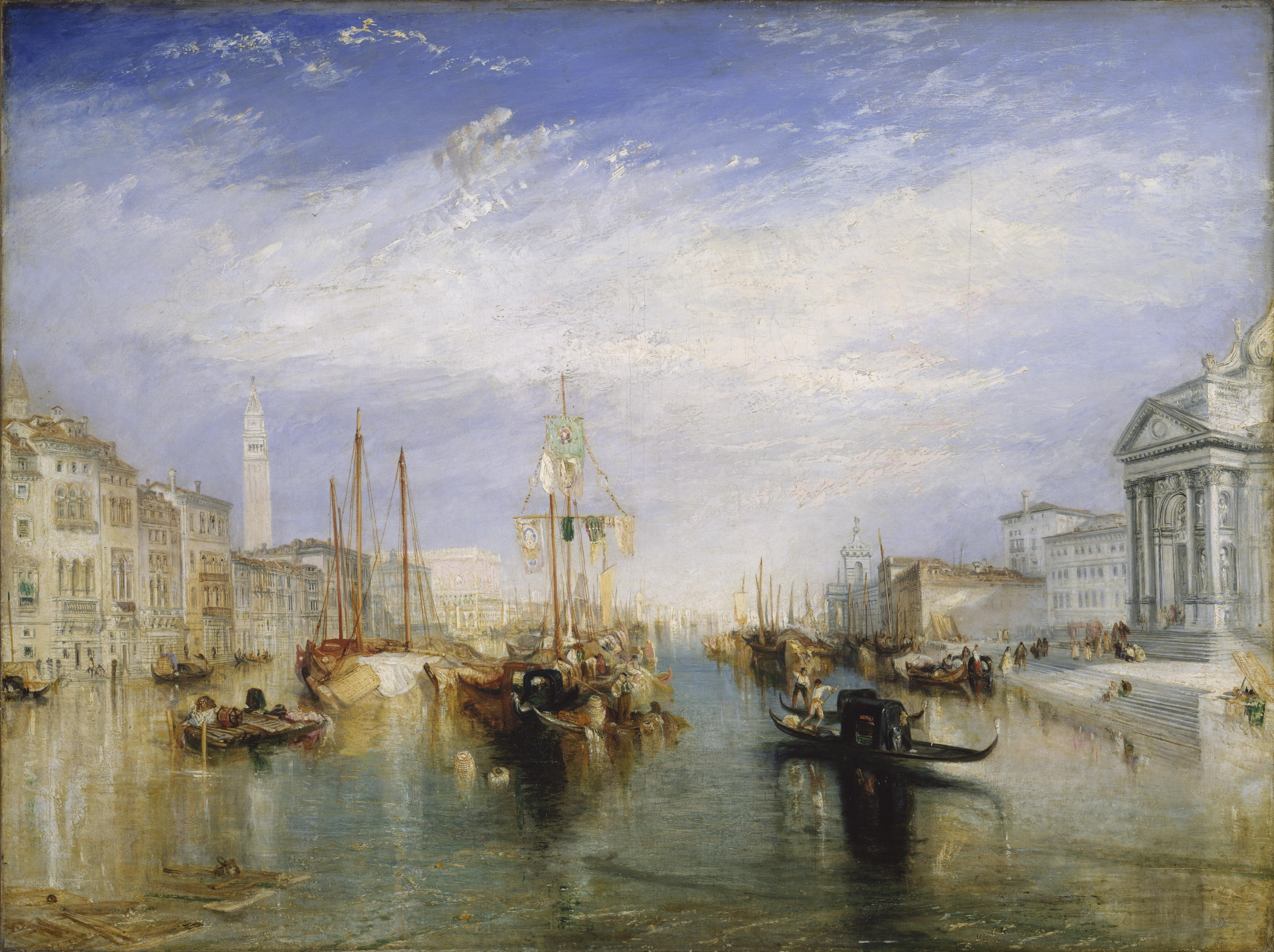
- Artist: J. M. W. Turner
- Year: c. 1835
- Medium: Oil on canvas
- Dimensions: 91.4 cm × 122.2 cm (36.0 in × 48.1 in)
- Location: Metropolitan Museum of Art, New York City
- Accession: 99.31
- Website: metmuseum.org/...437853

Venice, from the Porch of Madonna della Salute is an oil on canvas painting by J. M. W. Turner, of about 1835. It depicts an imagined image of Venice, as the view shown is not realistic. The painting was inspired by one of Turner's three visits to Venice, and shows Turner's skill as a maritime artist. The painting was displayed at the Royal Academy Exhibition of 1835 at Somerset House in London. The work is now in the collection of the Metropolitan Museum of Art in New York City.

This painting is part of the BBC's 100 Great Paintings.

== See also ==
- List of paintings by J. M. W. Turner
