= The Valley Farm =

Painting by John Constable

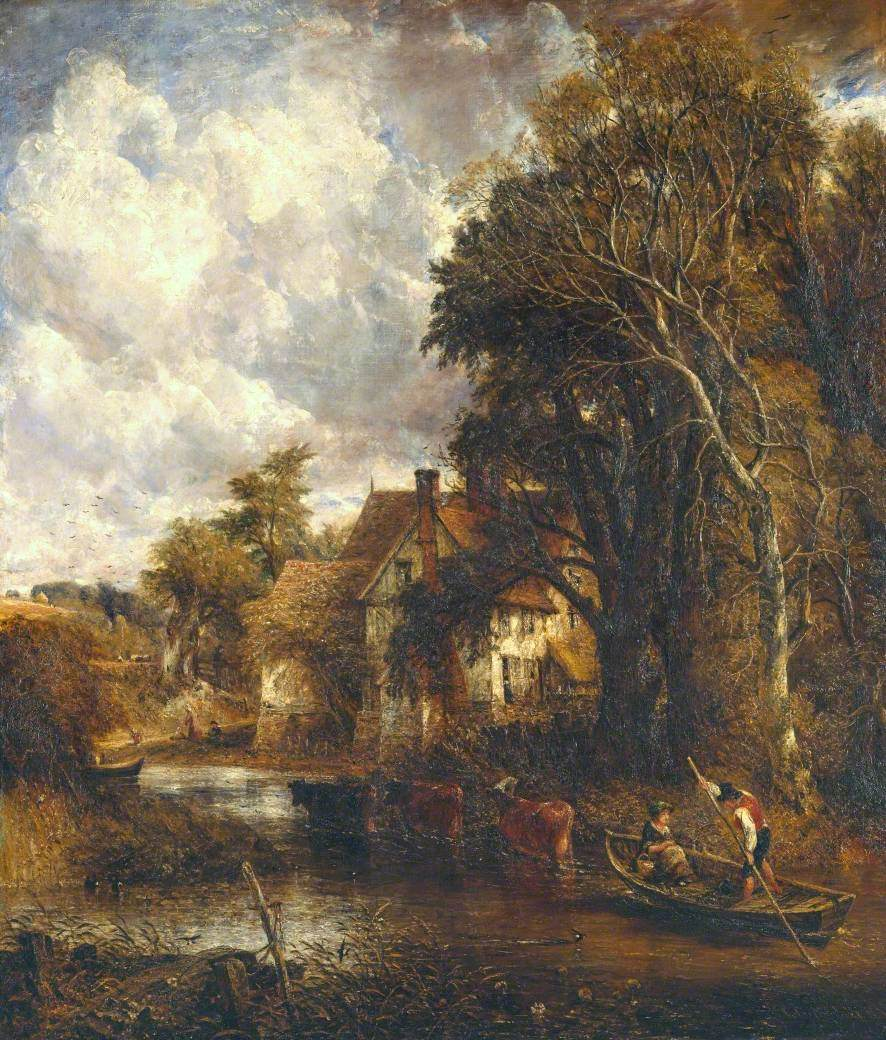
- Artist: John Constable
- Year: 1835
- Type: Oil on canvas, landscape painting
- Dimensions: 147.3 cm × 125.1 cm (58.0 in × 49.3 in)
- Location: Tate Britain, London

The Valley Farm is an 1835 landscape painting by the British artist John Constable. Produced towards the end of his career, it features a view of the River Stour on the border of Essex and Suffolk in Eastern England. Now known as Constable Country, it depicts Willy Lott's Cottage at Flatford, a landscape he had painted a number of times.

The painting was displayed at the Royal Academy Exhibition of 1835 in London, but critical reception was more muted than previous reviews of Constable's works. Today the painting is in the collection of the Tate Britain in Pimlico, having been gifted to the nation by the art collector Robert Vernon in 1847.

== See also ==
- List of paintings by John Constable

== Bibliography ==
- Bailey, Anthony. John Constable: A Kingdom of his Own. Random House, 2012.
- Charles, Victoria. Constable. Parkstone International, 2015.
- Hamilton, James. Constable: A Portrait. Hachette UK, 2022.
- Hamlyn, Robin. Robert Vernon's Gift: British Art for the Nation 1847. Tate Gallery, 1993.
- Venning, Barry. Constable. Parkstone International, 2015.
