= Barmouth Sands =

Painting by William Collins

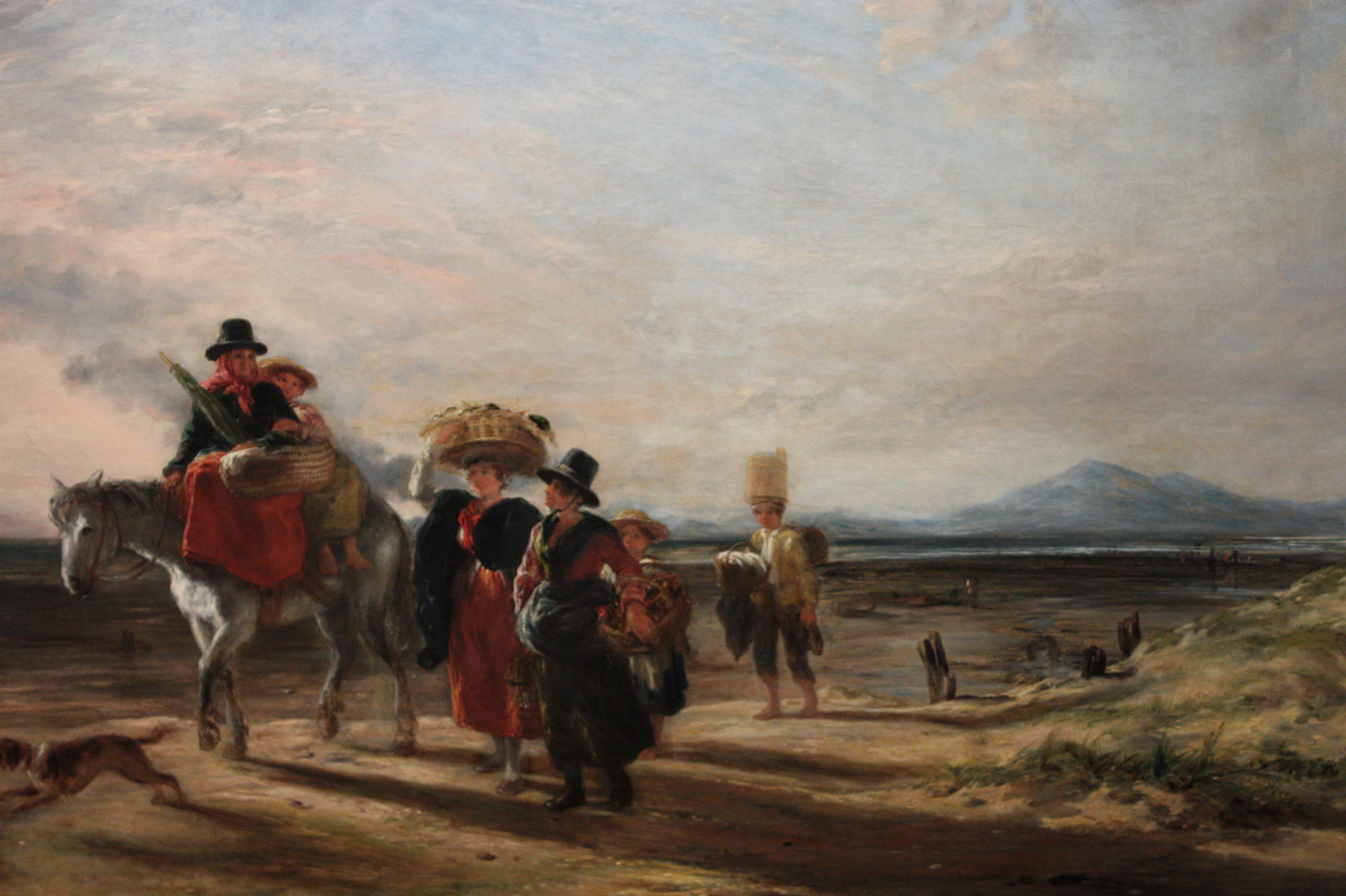
- Artist: William Collins
- Year: 1835
- Type: Oil on canvas, landscape painting
- Dimensions: 72 cm × 107 cm (28 in × 42 in)
- Location: Guildhall Art Gallery, London

Barmouth Sands is an 1835 landscape painting by the British artist William Collins. It portrays a view of the beach at Barmouth in North Wales, a historic port that was also developing as a seaside resort. Local inhabitants are shown taking their goods to market. Collins, a member of the Royal Academy and father of the author Wilkie Collins, was a noted painter of landscapes and genre scenes during the Regency era. The work was displayed at the Royal Academy's Summer Exhibition of 1835 at Somerset House. Today the painting is in the collection of the Guildhall Art Gallery in the City of London, having been acquired in 1902 through the gift of Charles Gassiot.

== Bibliography ==
- Bury, Stephen (ed.) Benezit Dictionary of British Graphic Artists and Illustrators, Volume 1. OUP, 2012.
- Roe, Sonia & Hardy, Pat. Oil Paintings in Public Ownership in the City of London. Public Catalogue Foundation, 2009.
- Wright, Christopher, Gordon, Catherine May & Smith, Mary Peskett. British and Irish Paintings in Public Collections: An Index of British and Irish Oil Paintings by Artists Born Before 1870 in Public and Institutional Collections in the United Kingdom and Ireland. Yale University Press, 2006.
