= The Drover's Departure =

Painting by Edwin Landseer

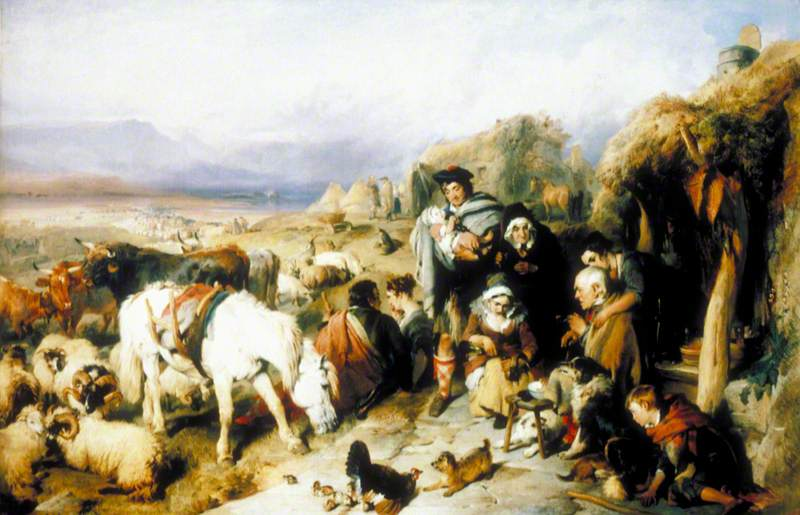
- Artist: Edwin Landseer
- Year: 1835
- Type: Oil on canvas, genre painting
- Dimensions: 125.8 cm × 191.2 cm (49.5 in × 75.3 in)
- Location: Victoria and Albert Museum, London

The Drover's Departure is an 1835 genre painting by the British artist Edwin Landseer. It depicts a scene in the Grampian Mountains in Northern Scotland where a drive of cattle and sheep is about to begin, in order to take the animals south to the larger English markets. It was the largest as well as one of the last of Landseer's scenes of Highland life which had been a major theme of his work over the preceding decade. The work was displayed at the Royal Academy Exhibition of 1835 at Somerset House, where it was a popular success with large crowds gathering around it.

Landseer later also submitted it to the Salon of 1855, part of the Paris Exposition. Today the painting is in the collection of the Victoria and Albert Museum in South Kensington, having been donated as part of the Sheepshanks Gift by the art collector Joseph Sheeksphanks in 1857.

== Bibliography ==
- Ormond, Richard. Sir Edwin Landseer. Philadelphia Museum of Art, 1981.
- Roe, Sonia. Oil Paintings in Public Ownership in the Victoria and Albert Museum. Public Catalogue Foundation, 2008.
