= The Last In =

Painting by William Mulready

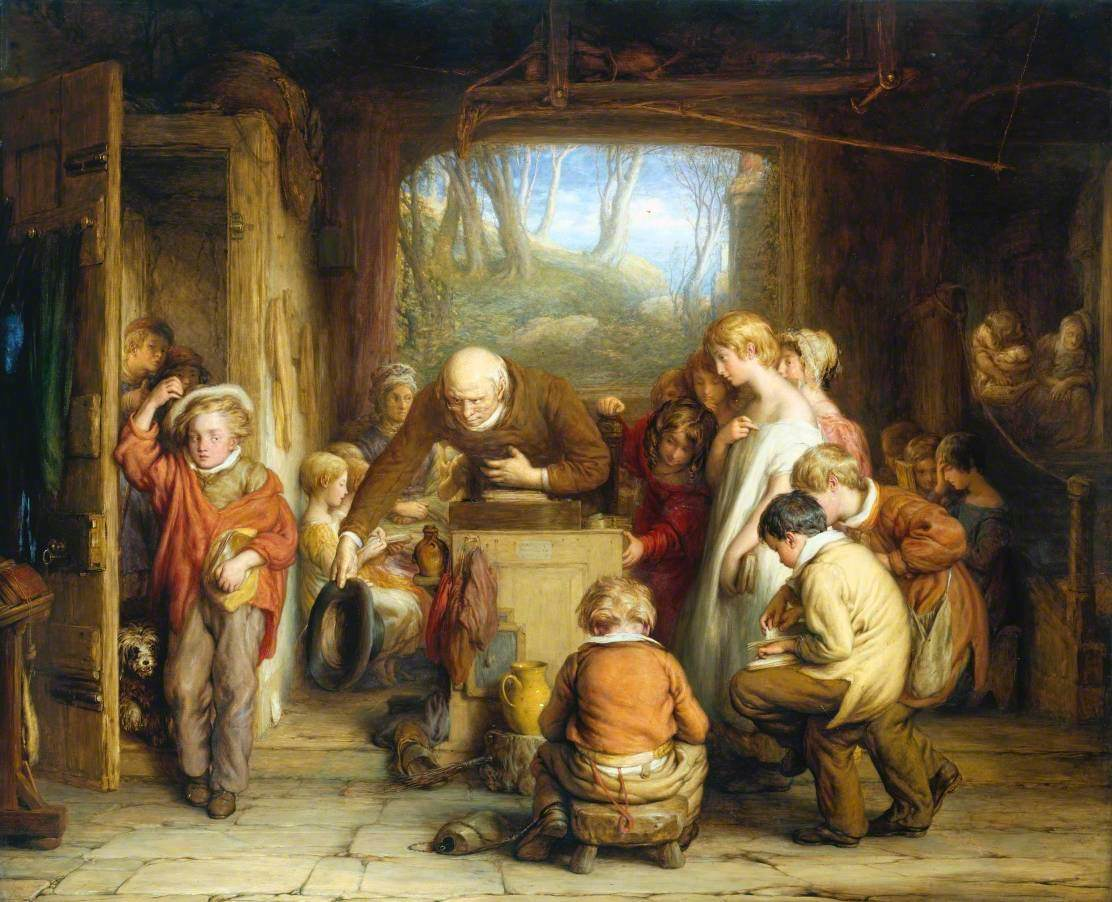
- Artist: William Mulready
- Year: 1835
- Type: Oil on mahogany, genre painting
- Dimensions: 76.2 cm × 62.2 cm (30.0 in × 24.5 in)
- Location: Tate Britain, London

The Last In is an oil on mahogany painting by the Irish artist William Mulready, from 1835. It is held in the Tate Britain, in London.

== History and description ==
A genre painting, it shows a school scene where the schoolmaster bows and doffs his hat with an ironic flourish to a latecomer student as "the last in". Some other boys hesitate nervously behind him, fearing punishment for being even later. The boy seated in front of the schoolmaster is already facing a punishment. He is tied by his leg to a log, while the birch rod lies nearby in the ground. The backdrop of a landscape suggests they would all rather be outside playing. Mulready was known for his scenes of ordinary life, often featuring children.

The picture was displayed at the Royal Academy Exhibition of 1835 held at Somerset House, in London. Acquired by the art collector Robert Vernon it was given by him to the National Gallery, in 1847, as part of the Vernon Gift. Today it is in the collection of the Tate Britain, in Pimlico.

== Bibliography ==
- Humphreys, Richard. The Tate Britain Companion to British Art. Harry N. Abrams, 2001.
- Kinmonth, Claudia. Irish Rural Interiors in Art. Yale University Press, 2006
- Solkin, David H. Painting Out of the Ordinary: Modernity and the Art of Everyday Life in Early Nineteenth-century Britain. Yale University Press, 2009.
