= Royal Academy Exhibition of 1835 =

1835 art exhibition in London

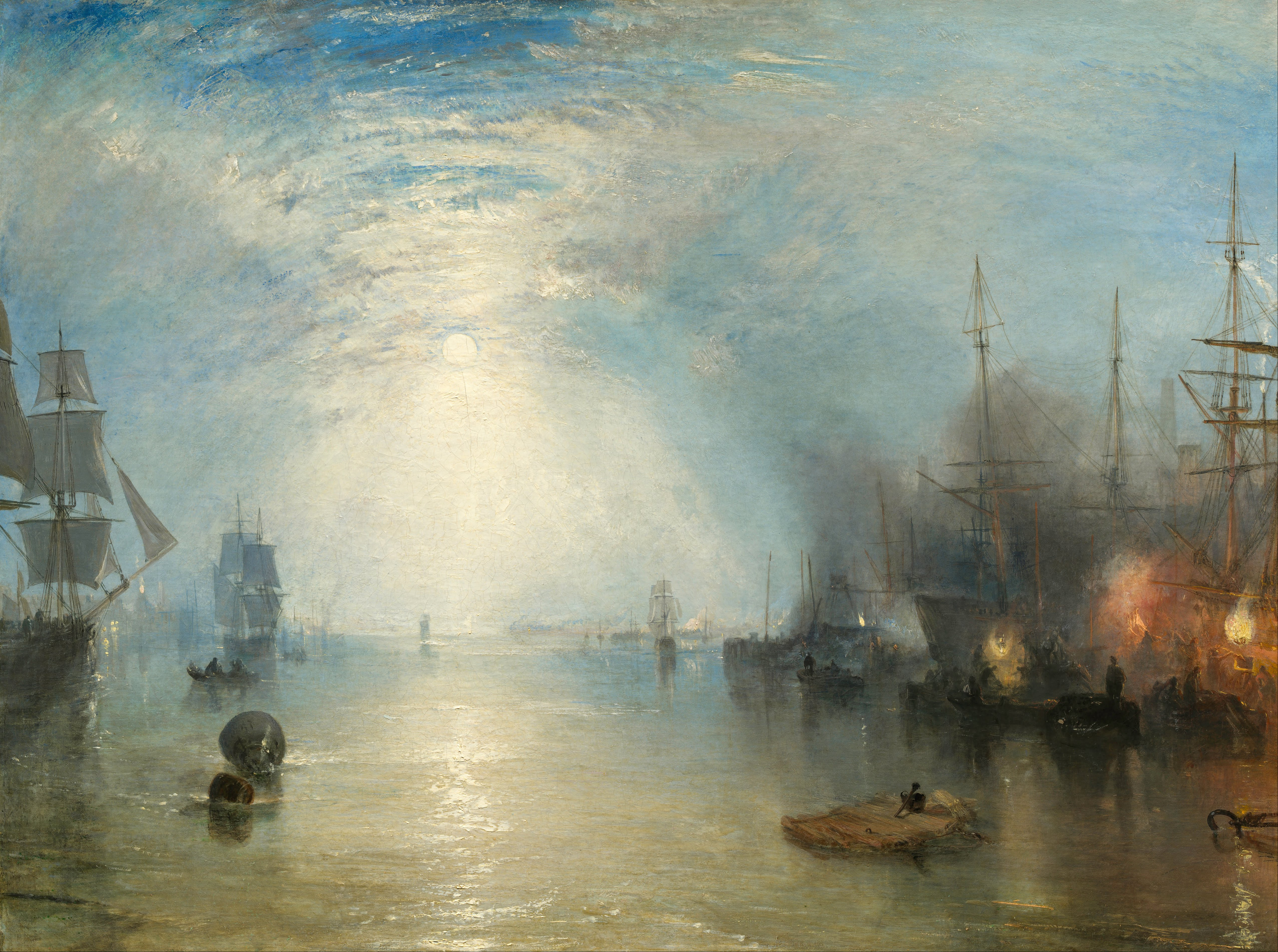
Keelmen Heaving in Coals by Moonlight by J. M. W. Turner

The Royal Academy Exhibition of 1835 was an art exhibition held at Somerset House in London between 4 May and 18 July 1835. It was sixty seventh annual Summer Exhibition of the British Royal Academy of Arts. The exhibition took place during the reign of King William IV on the cusp of the Victorian era. The President of the Royal Academy, the Irish artist Martin Archer Shee, exhibited a a portrait of the king.

The celebrated landscape painter John Constable featured a single entry The Valley Farm, a view of a scene near Flatford in Constable Country although it received poor comparisons to earlier pictures he had produced of the same scene. His rival J. M. W. Turner displayed a range of paintings amongst which was Keelmen Heaving in Coals by Moonlight, a view of the River Tyne at Newcastle. Turner also submitted his The Burning of the Houses of Lords and Commons depicting the fire that had engulfed Westminster in October 1834. In addition he portrayed a view of Venice as well as the seascape Line Fishing, Off Hastings.

Other works on display included Edwin Landseer's The Drover's Departure, portraying a scene in the Scottish Highlands. William Etty submitted a number of paintings, several of which included the nude scenes for which he was best known, including Venus and her Satellites and Phaedria and Cymochles on the Idle Lake. Archer Shee submitted a number of portraits aside from the king, but critical reaction was poor with negative comparisons to his predecessor Thomas Lawrence which had dogged him since he assumed the presidency. Other portraitists displaying work included Thomas Phillips, Henry Perronet Briggs and Henry William Pickersgill.

The young Irishman Daniel Maclise drew attention with his The Chivalric Vow of the Ladies of the Peacock. The Scottish artist David Wilkie earned praise for his history painting Christopher Columbus Explaining His Intended Voyage. As well as genre paintings Wilkie also displayed a portrait of the Duke of Wellington.

== Gallery ==
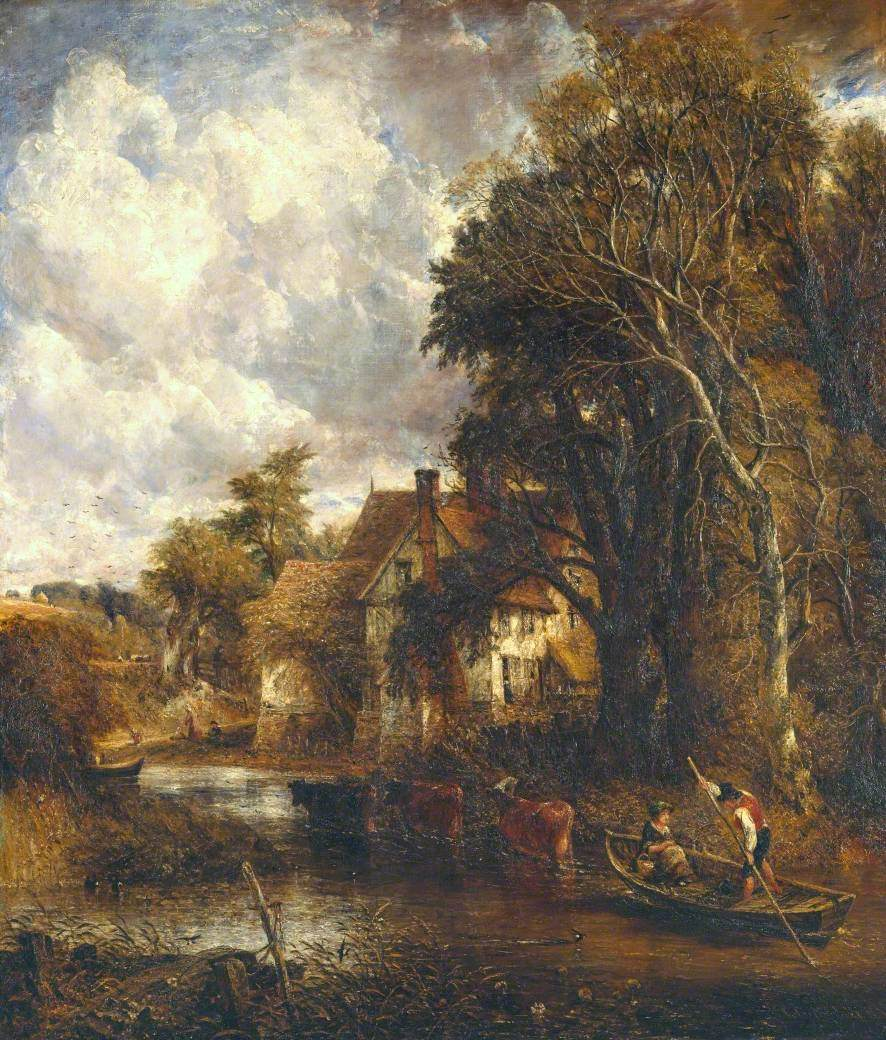
The Valley Farm by John Constable

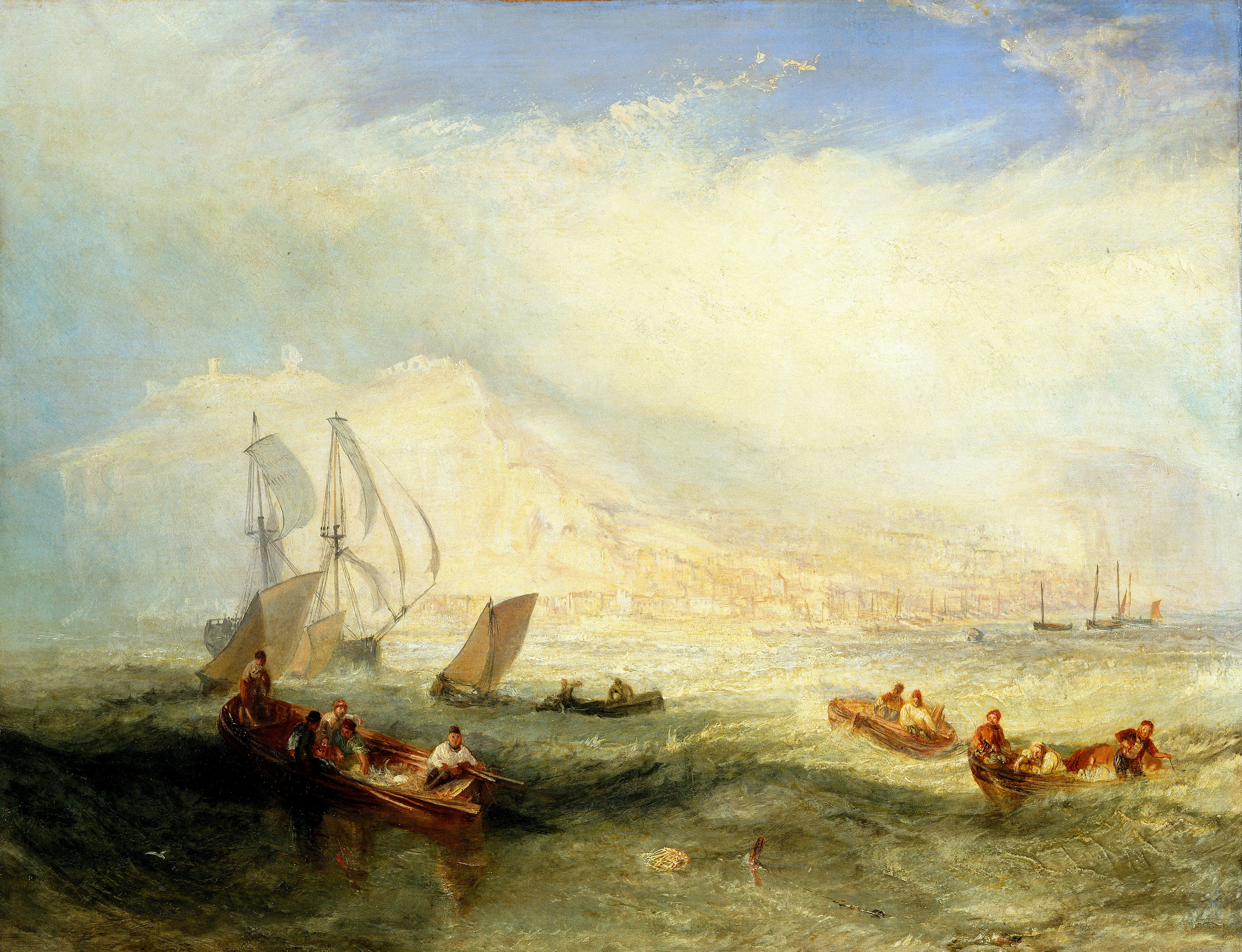
Line Fishing, Off Hastings by J.M.W. Turner

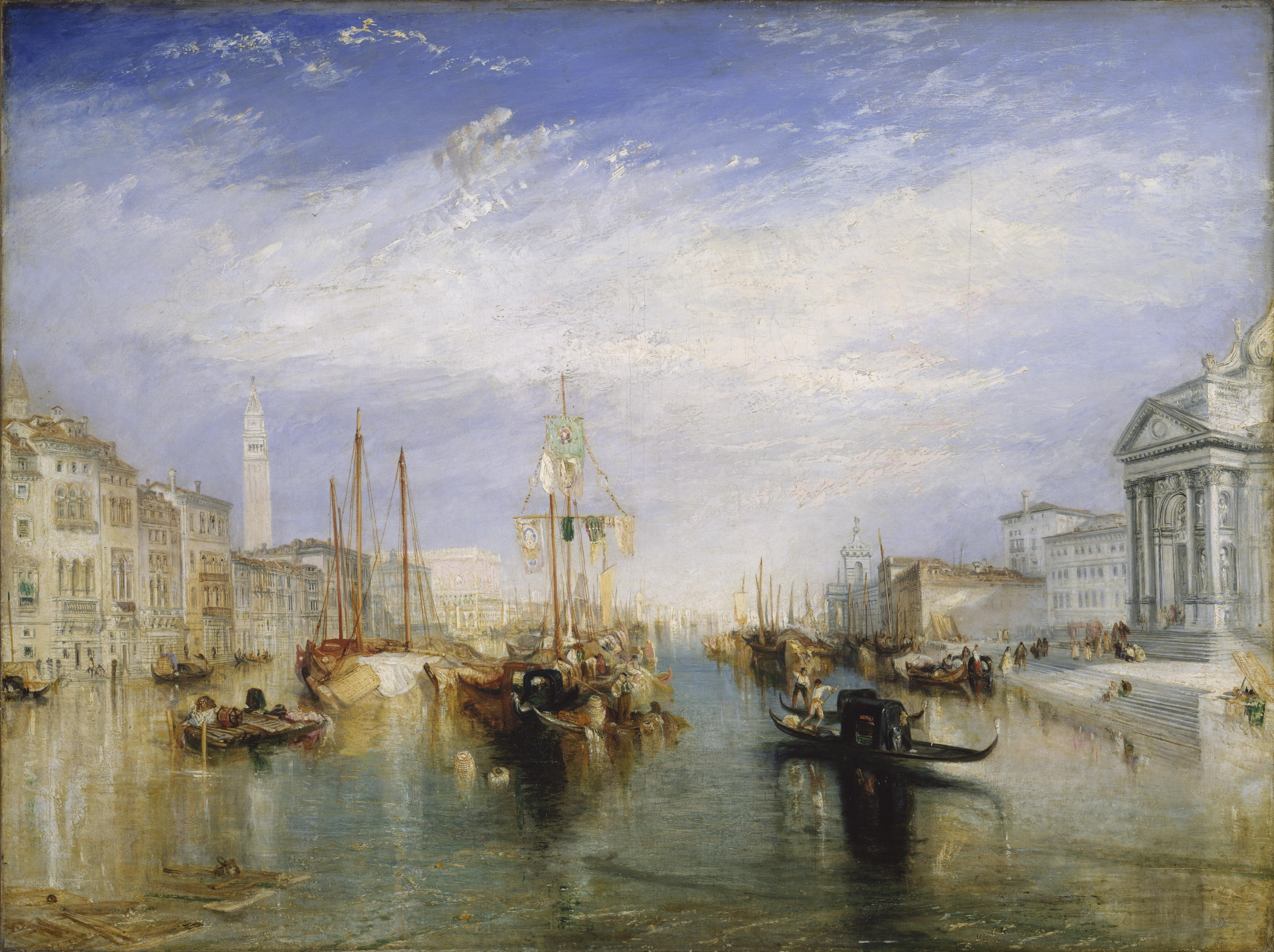
Venice From the Porch of Madonna della Salute by J. M. W. Turner

The Burning of the Houses of Lords and Commons by J.M.W. Turner

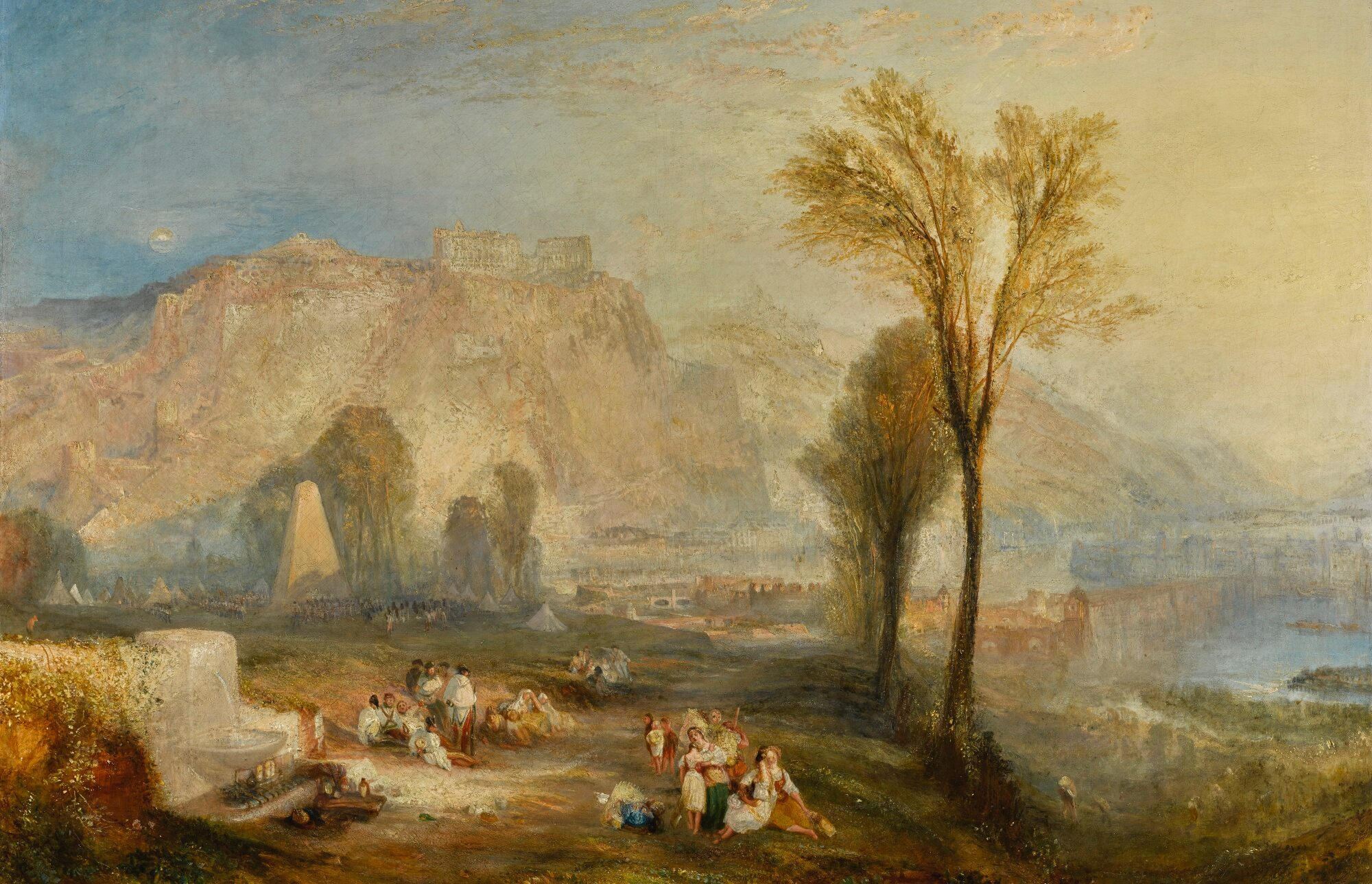
The Bright Stone of Honour by J. M. W. Turner

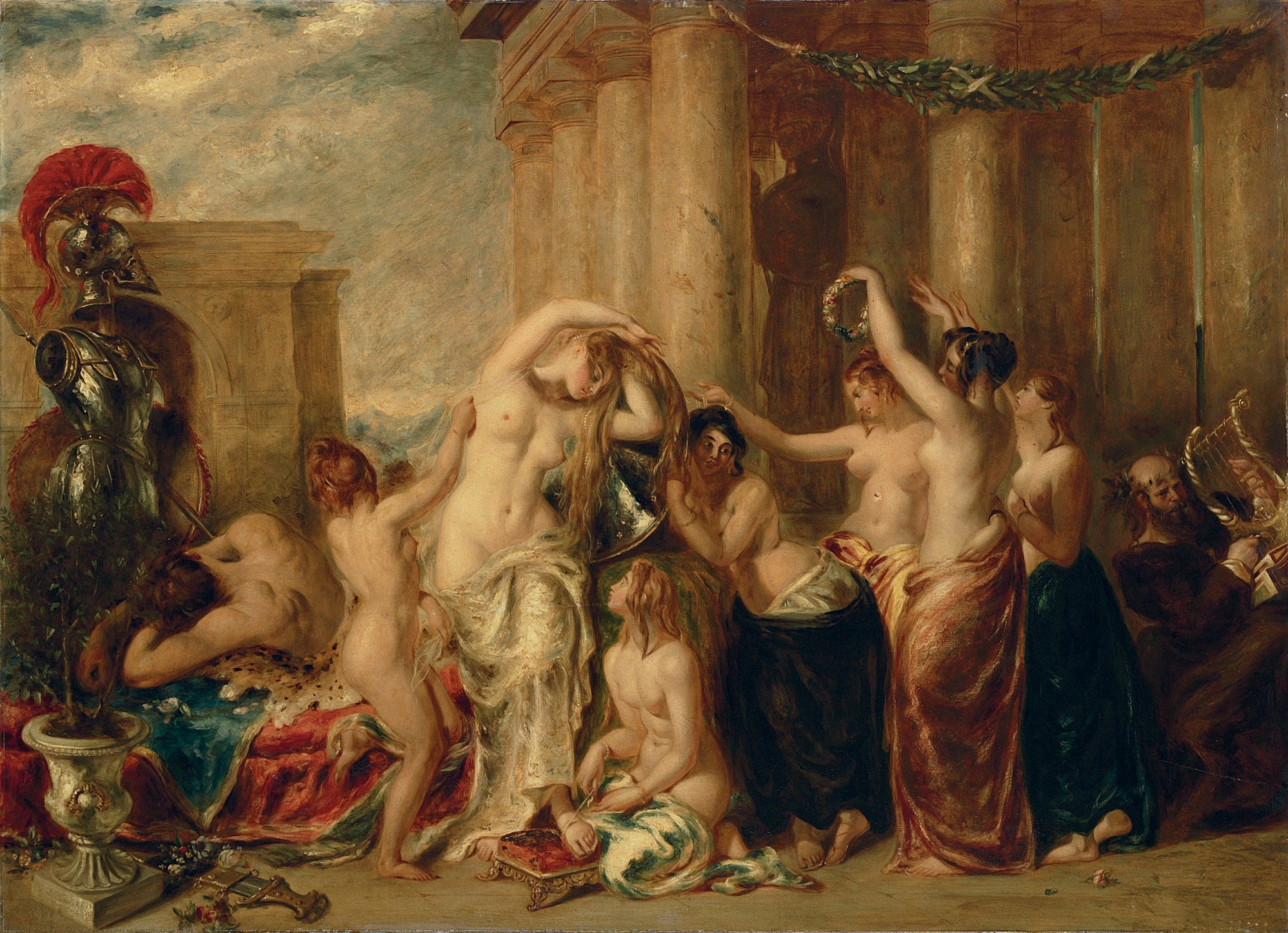
Venus and Her Satellites by William Etty

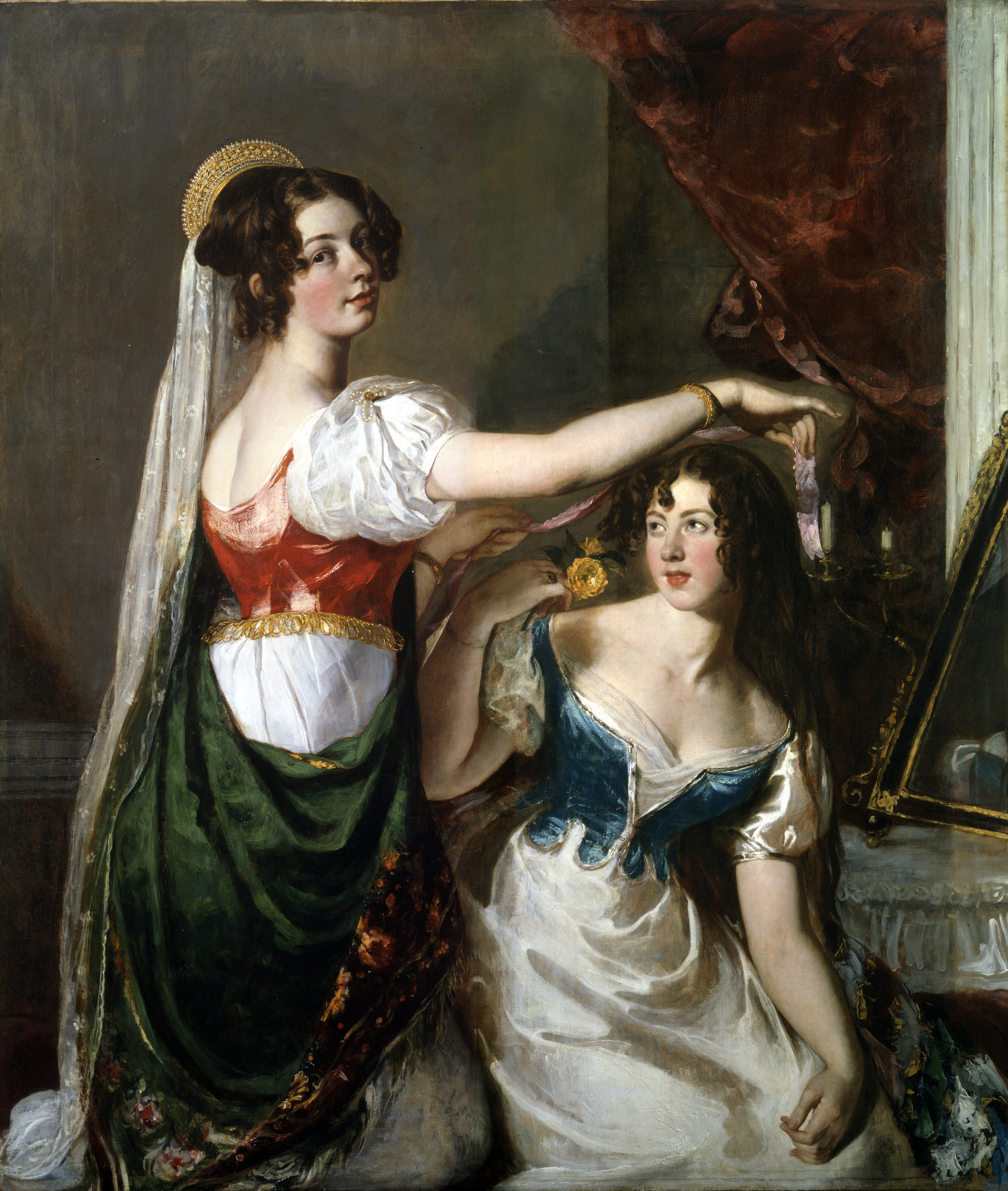
Preparing for a Fancy Dress Ball by William Etty

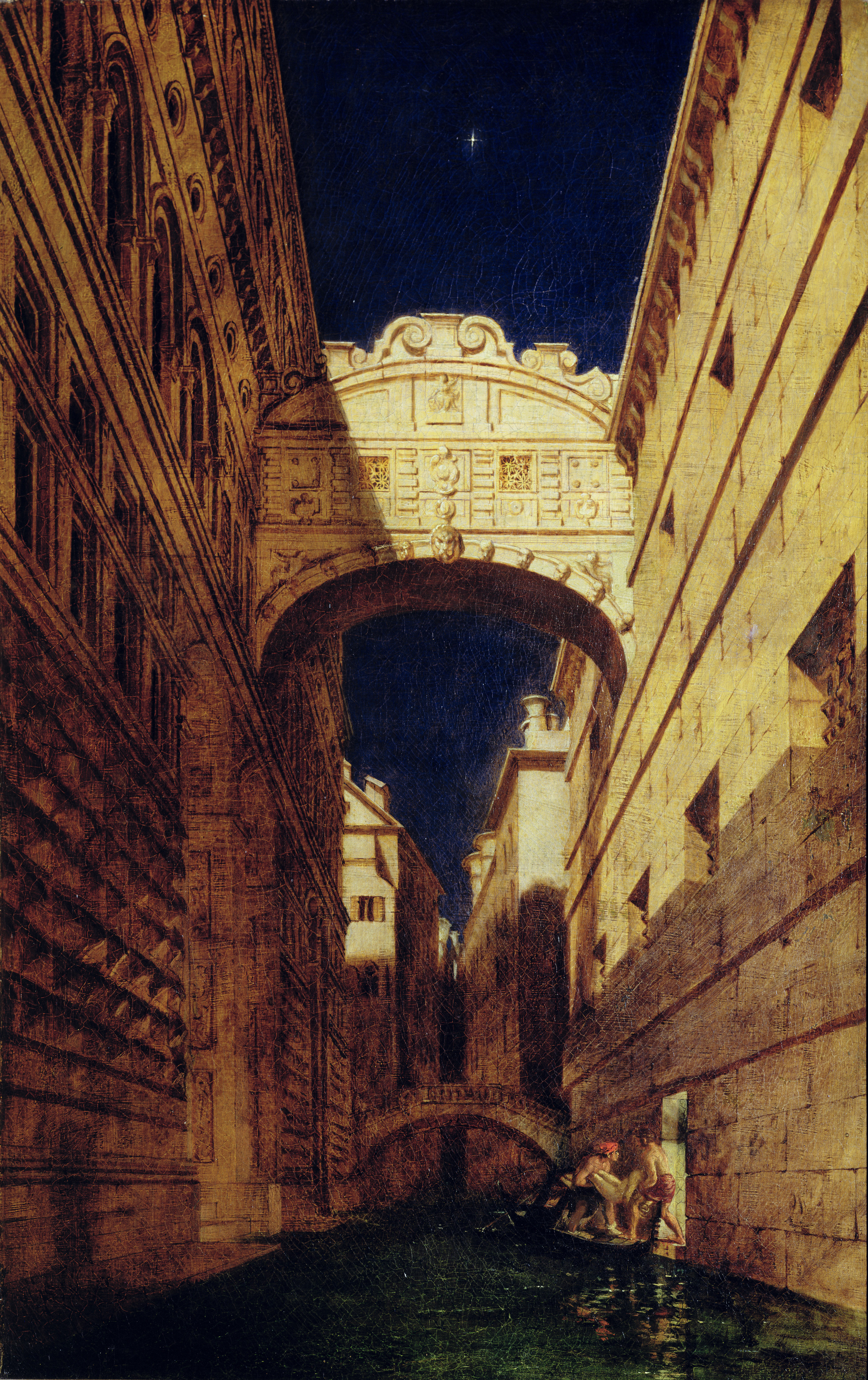
The Bridge of Sighs by William Etty

Phaedria and Cymochles on the Idle Lake by William Etty

Hay Barge off Greenwich by Edward William Cooke

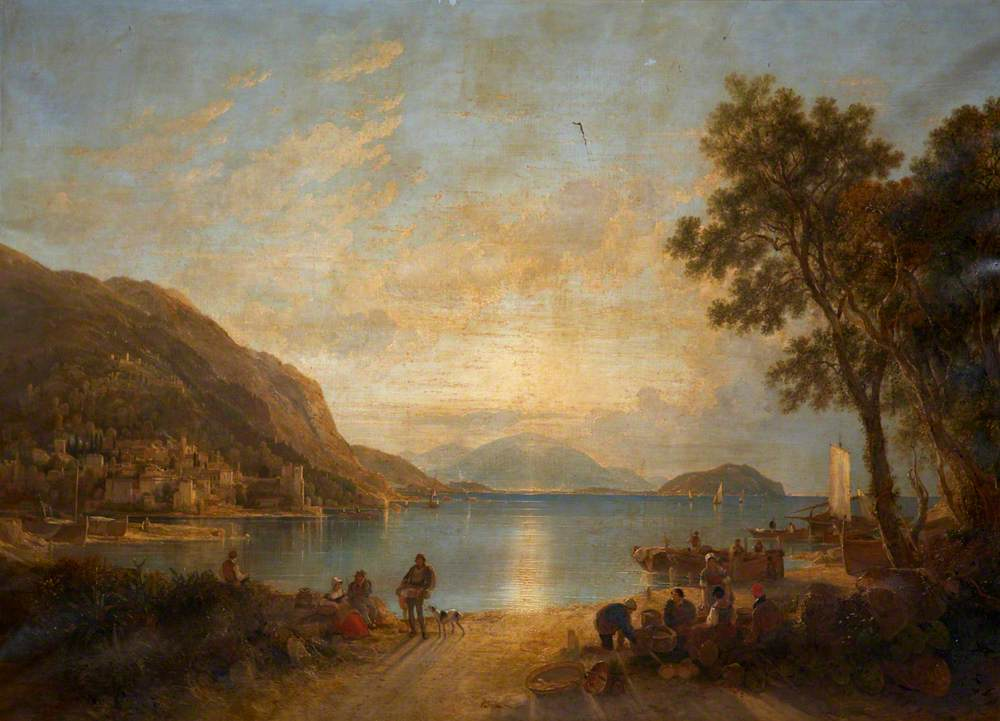
Lake Garda by Augustus Wall Callcott

Sancho Panza in the Days of his Youth by David Wilkie

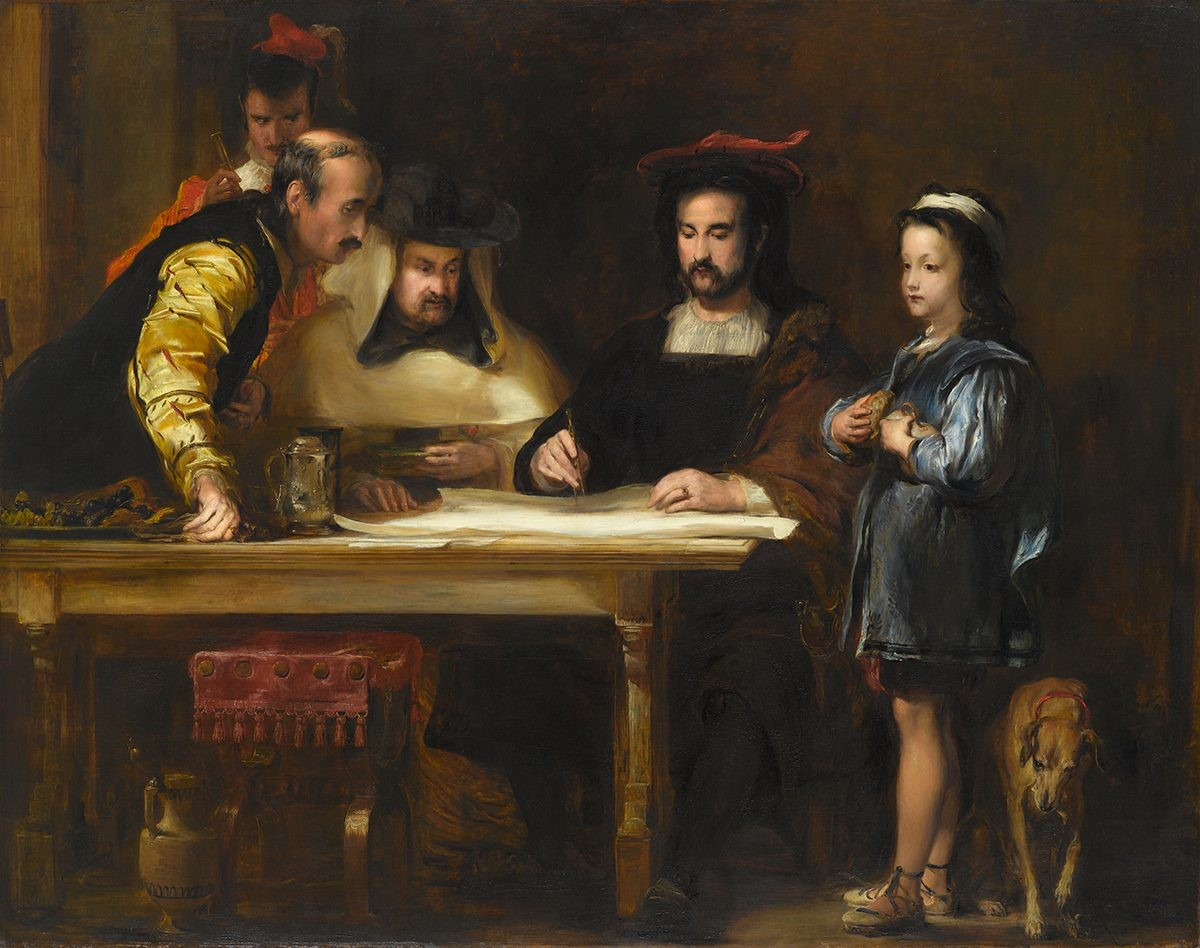
Christopher Columbus Explaining His Intended Voyage by David Wilkie

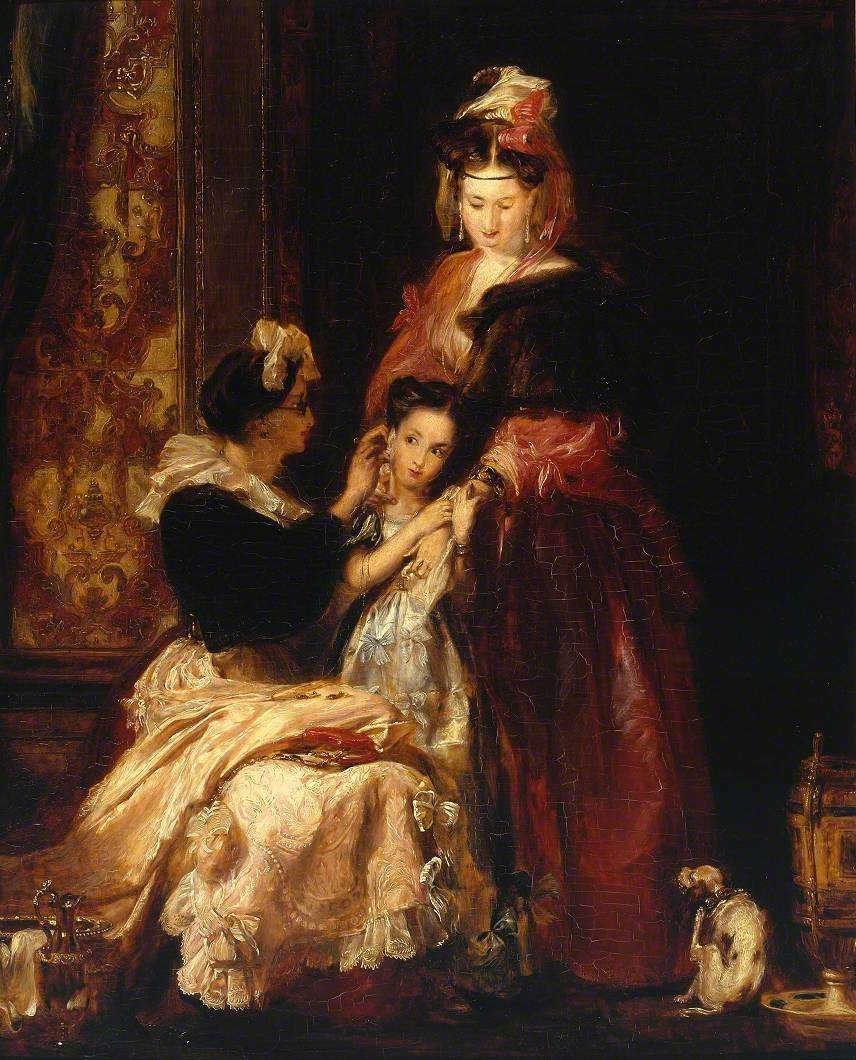
The First Ear-Ring by David Wilkie

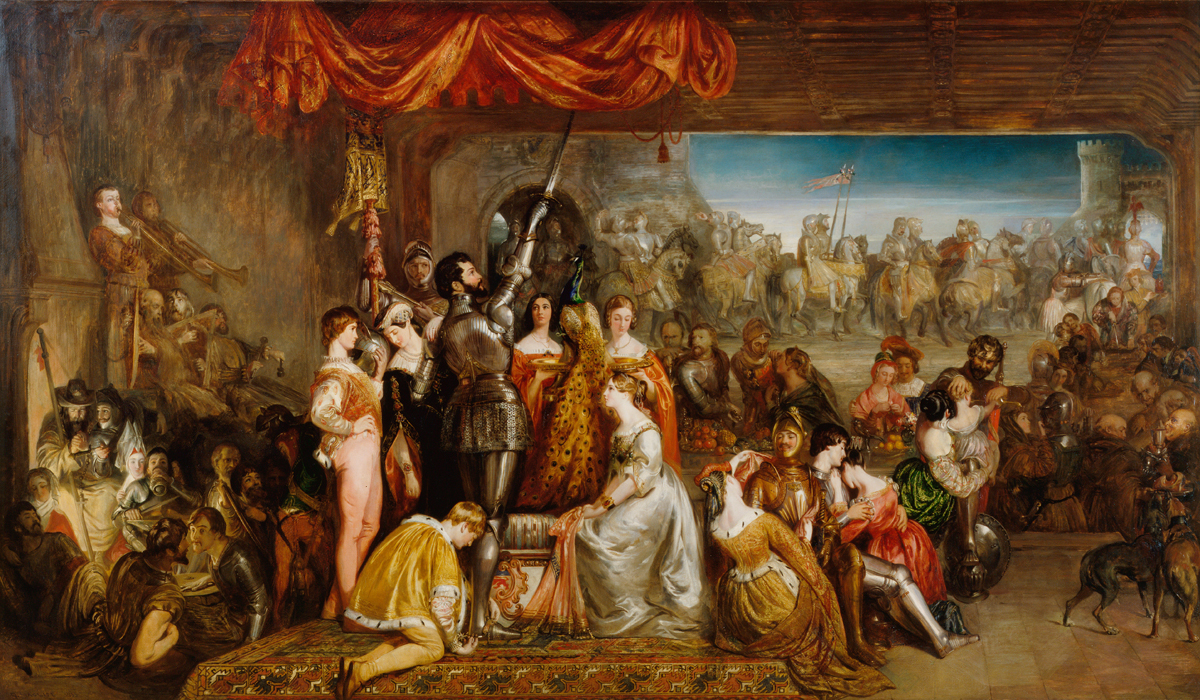
The Chivalric Vow of the Ladies of the Peacock by Daniel Maclise

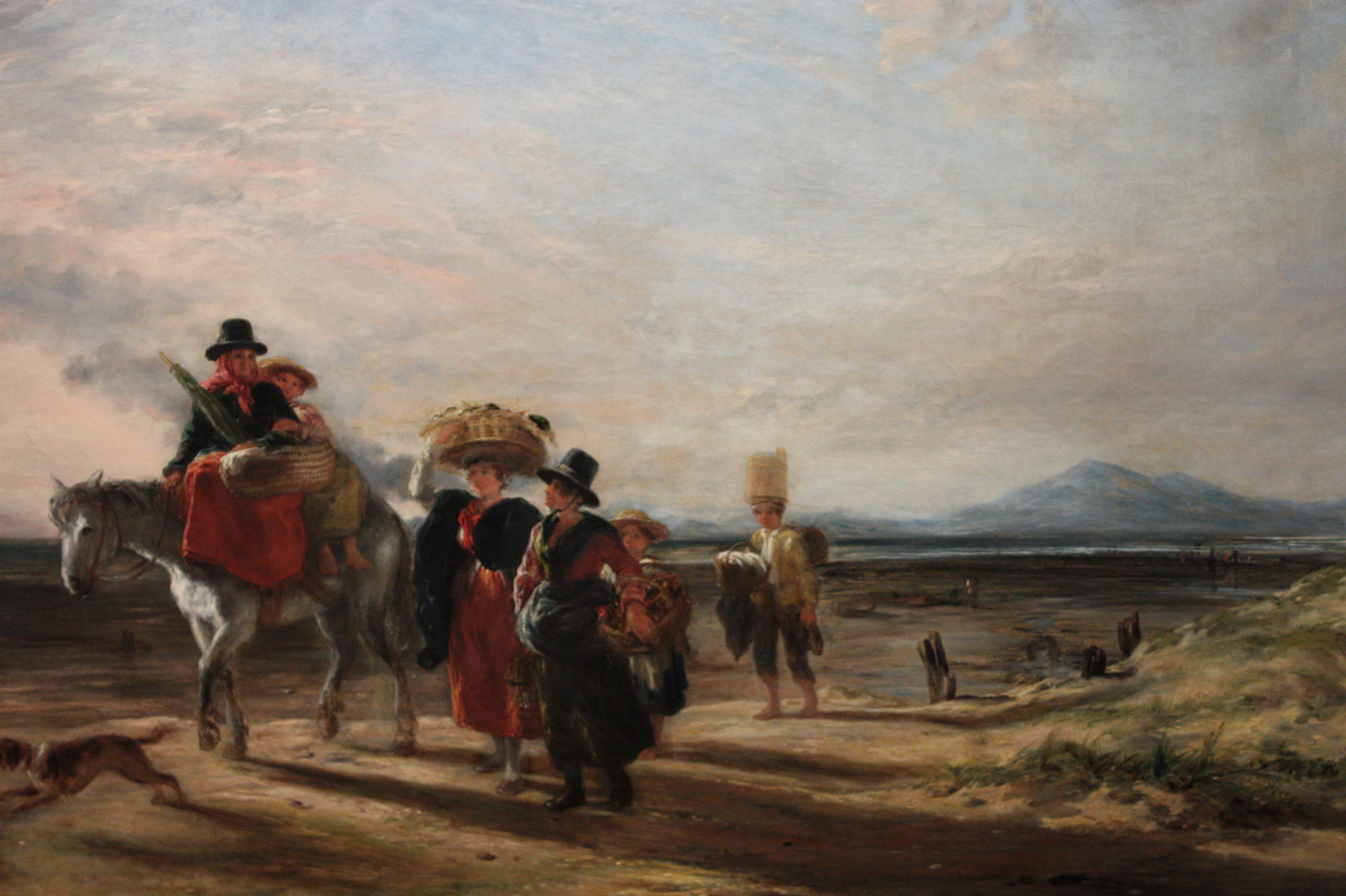
Barmouth Sands by William Collins

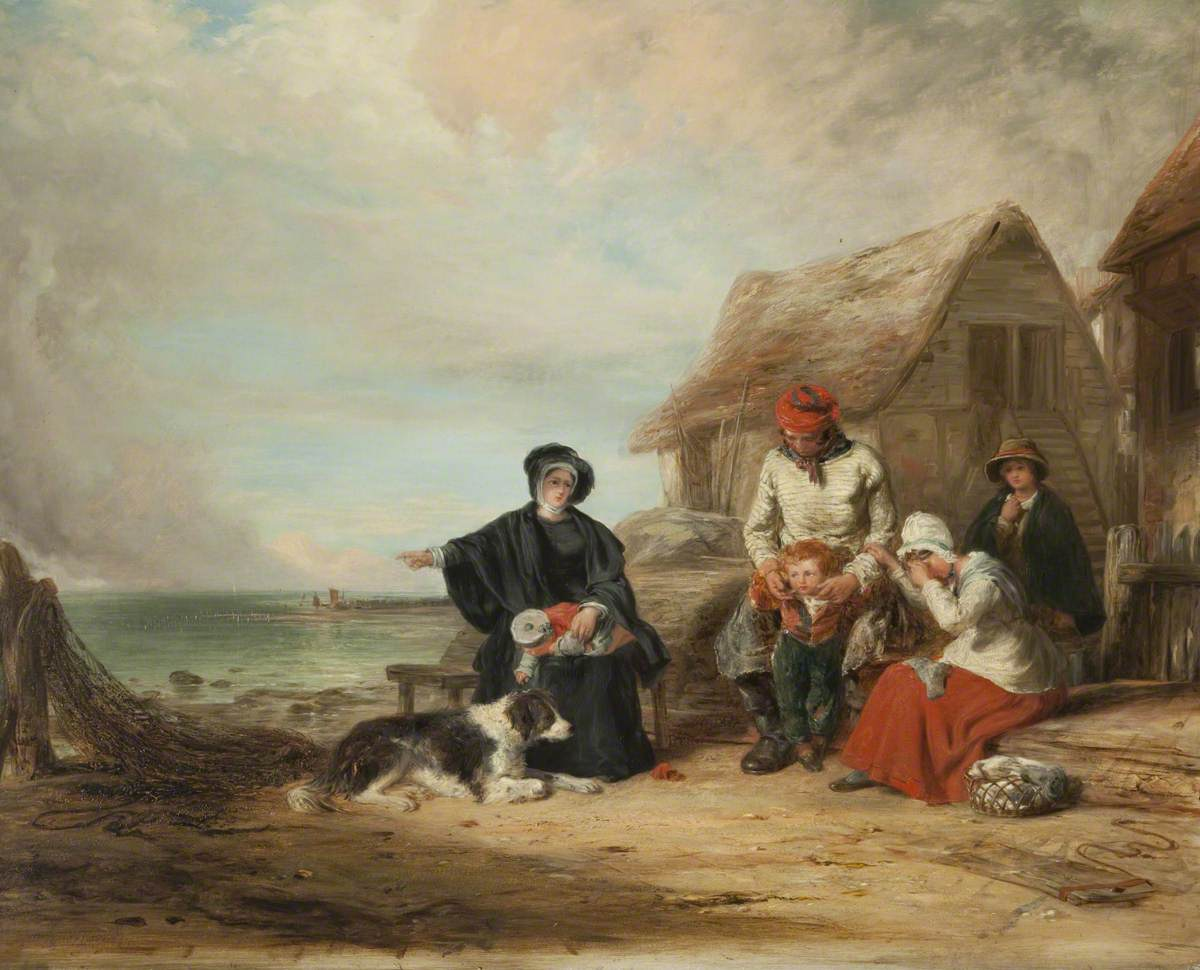
The Mariner's Widow by William Collins

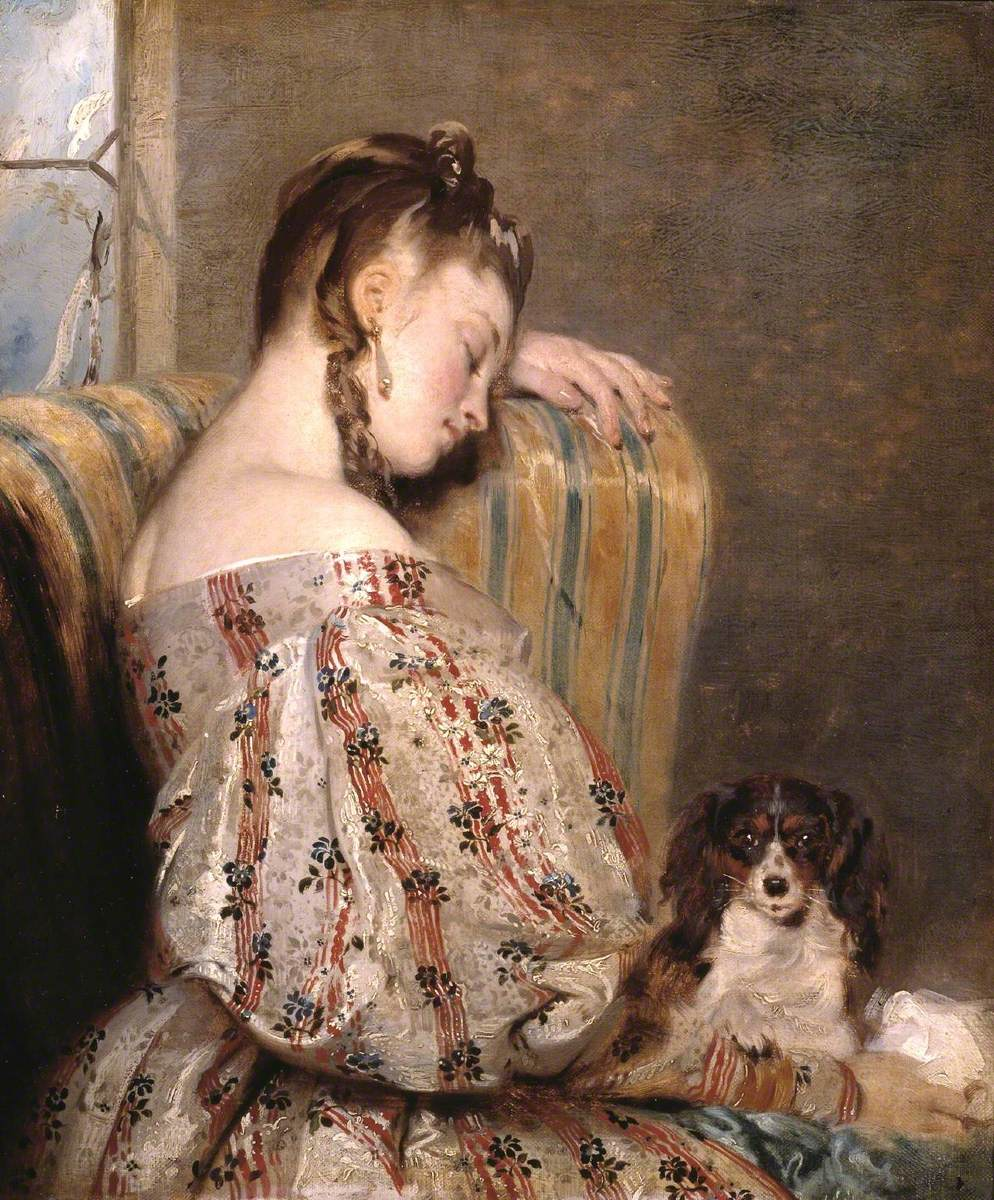
Vigilance by Henry Wyatt

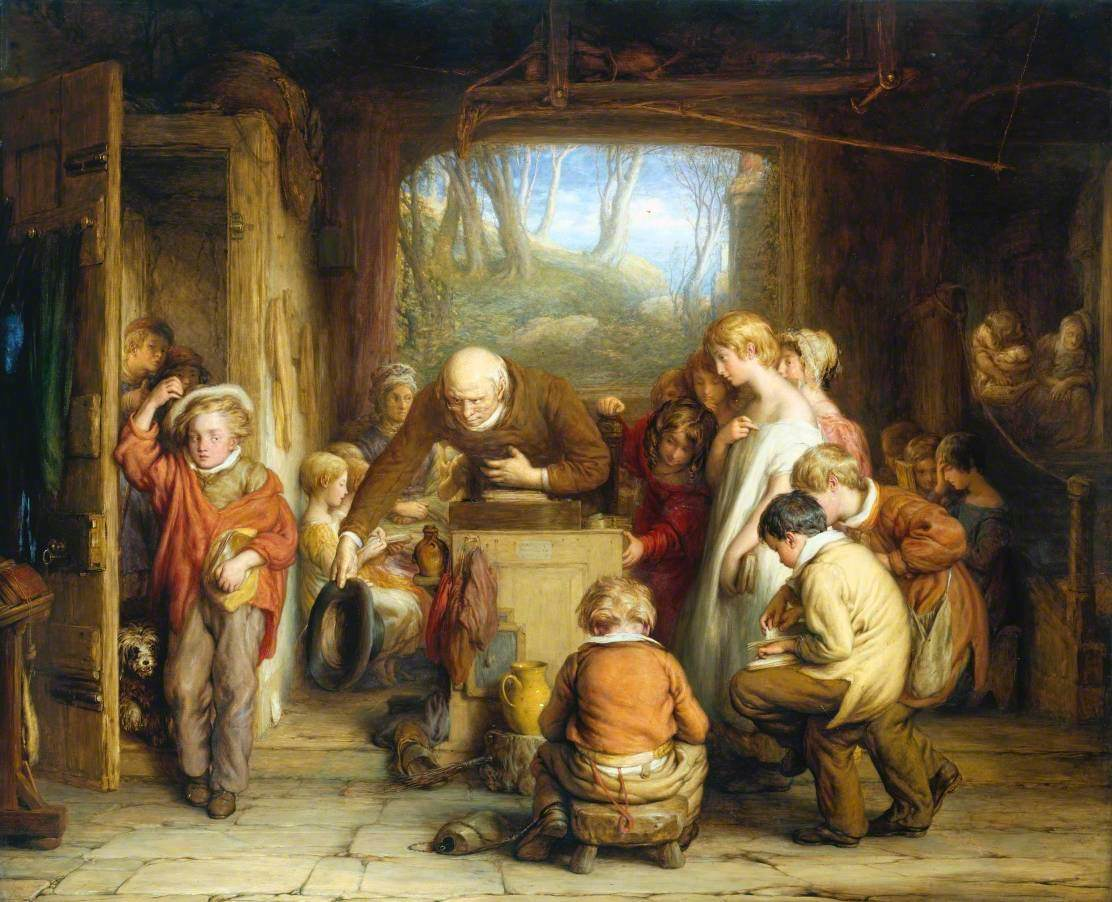
The Last In by William Mulready

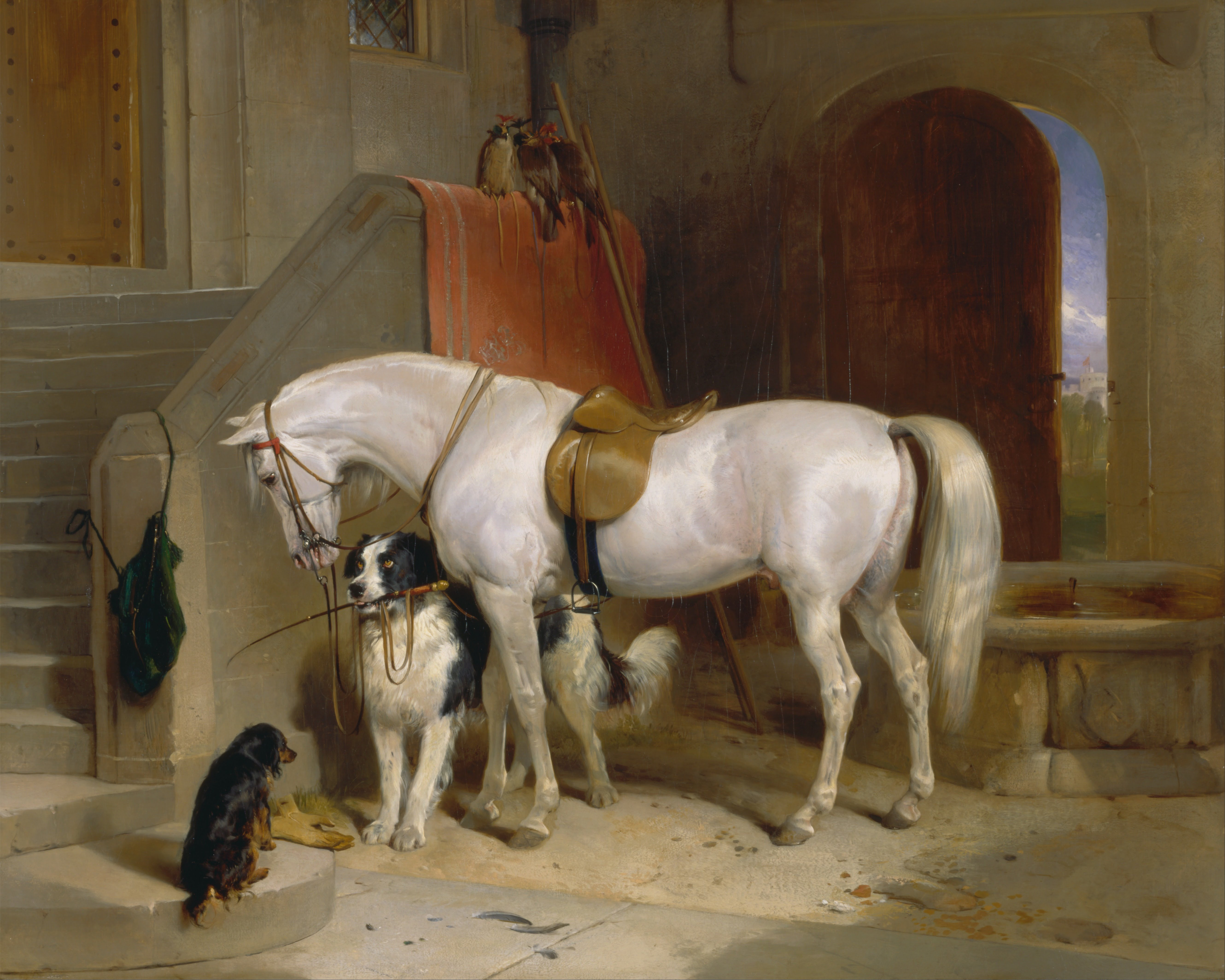
Favourites by Edwin Landseer

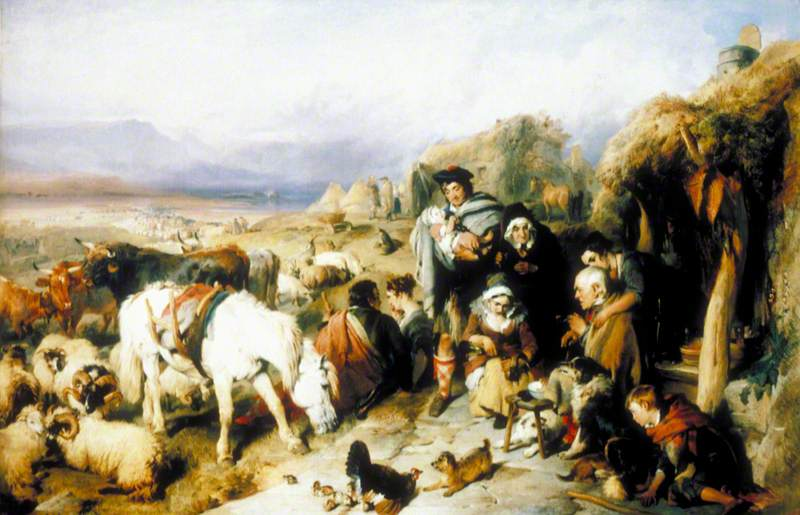
The Drover's Departure by Edwin Landseer

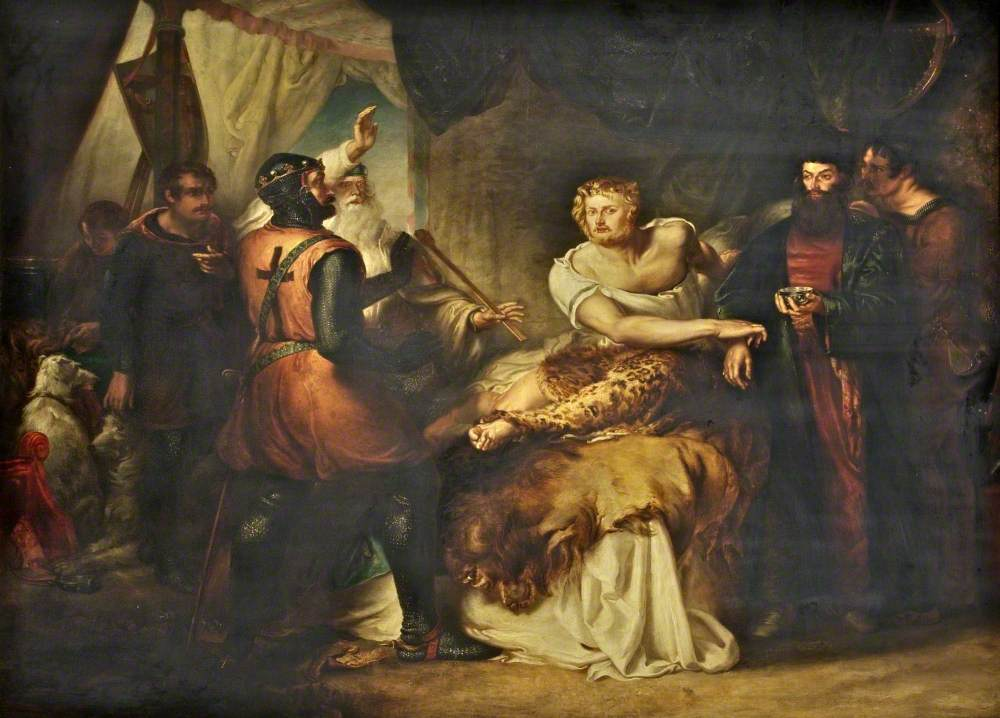
Richard I and Saladin by Solomon Hart

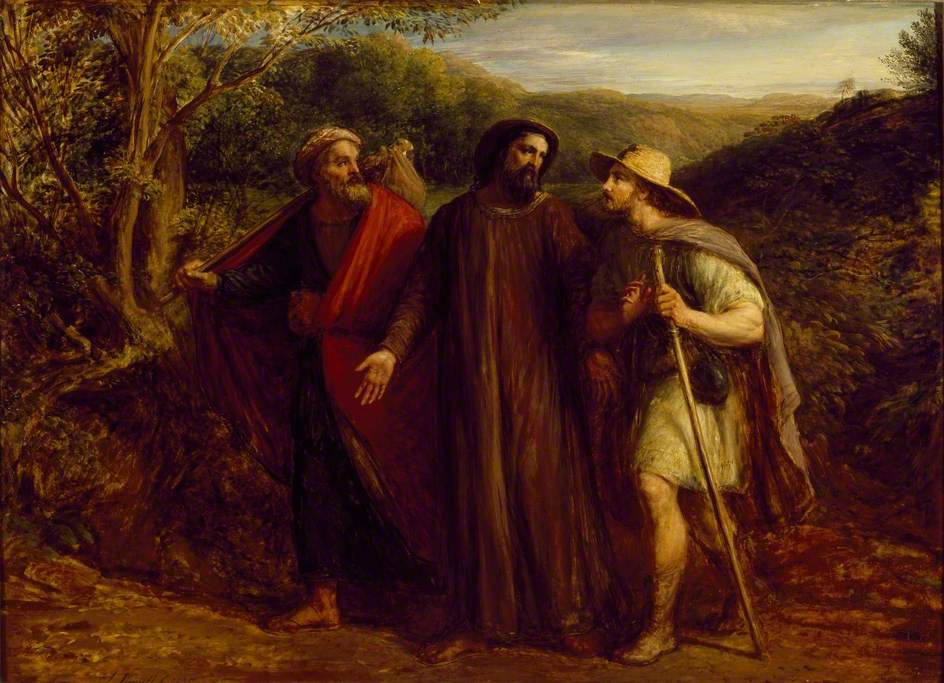
Christ's Appearance to the two Disciples Journeying to Emmaus by John Linnell

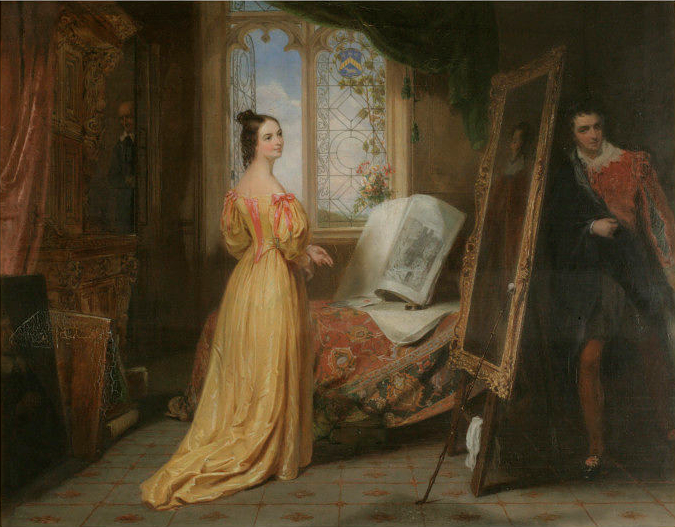
Scene from the Honeymoon by George Clint

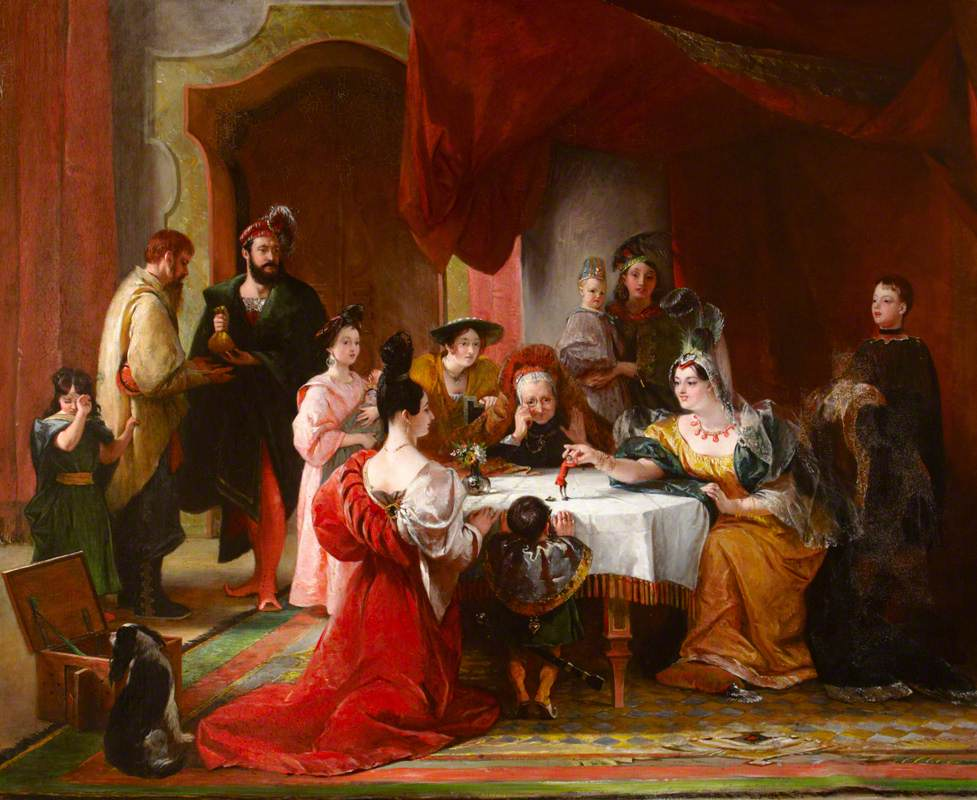
Gulliver Presented to the Queen of Brobdignag by Charles Robert Leslie

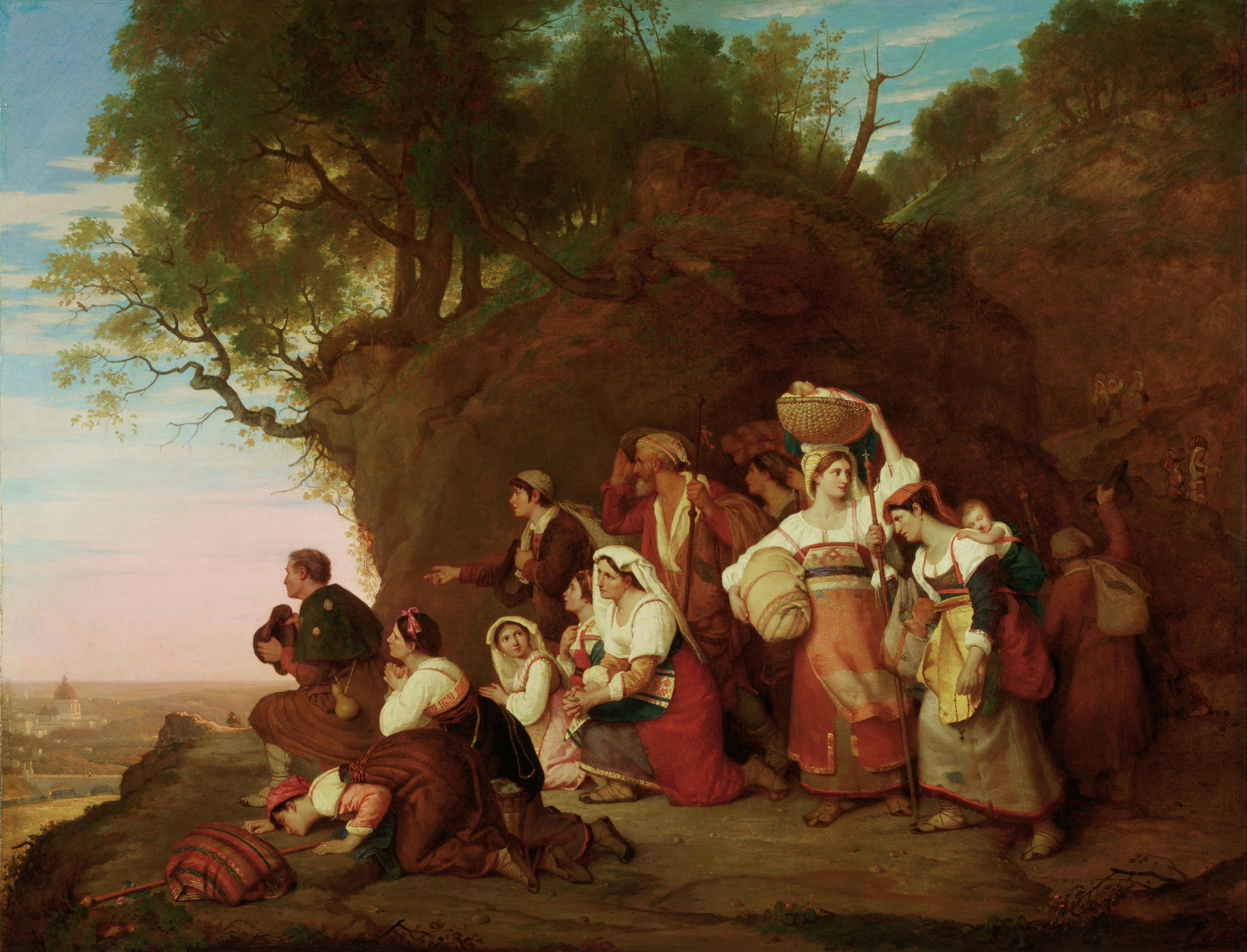
Pilgrims Arriving in Sight of Rome by Charles Lock Eastlake

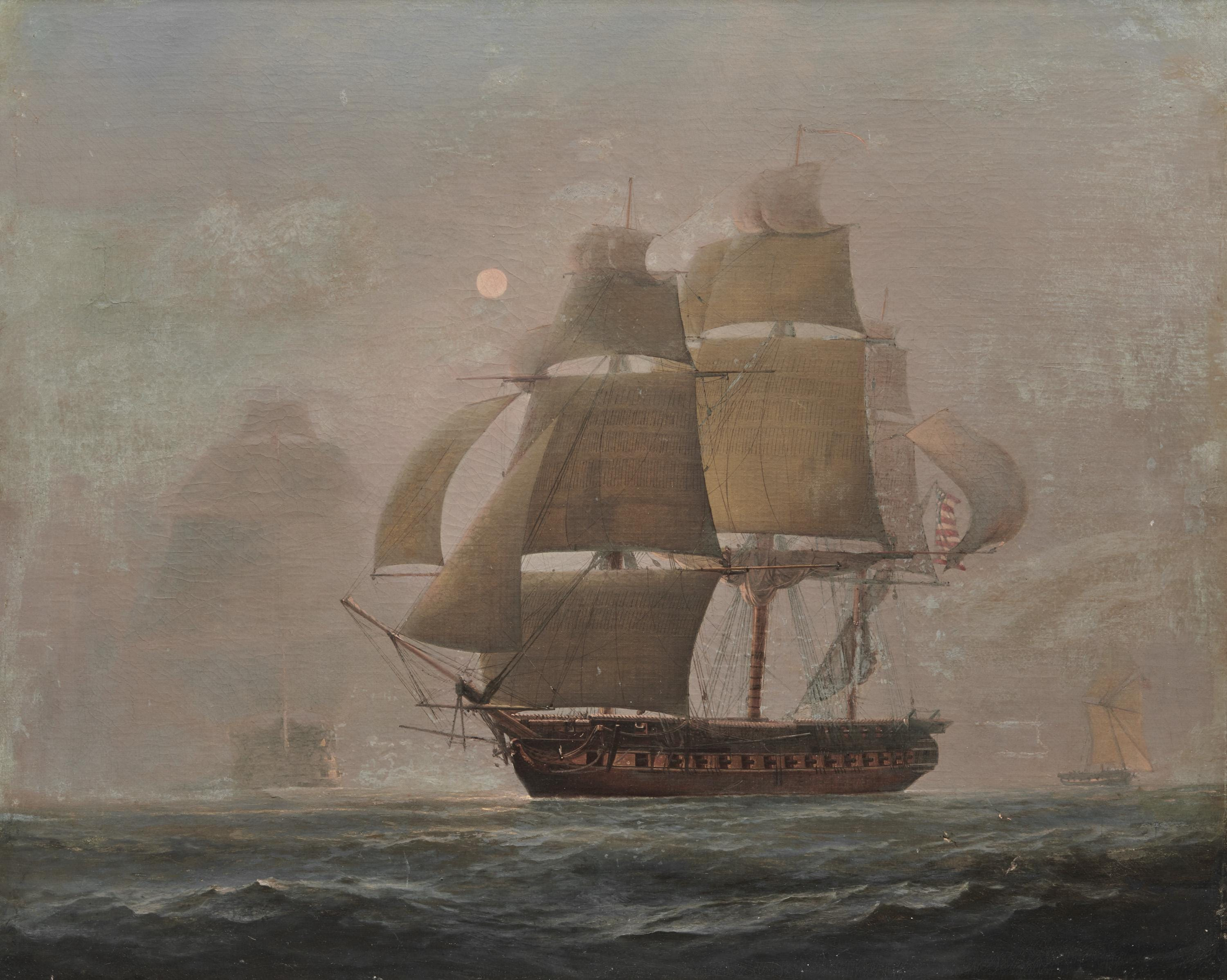
The American Frigate Constitution by Charles Henry Seaforth

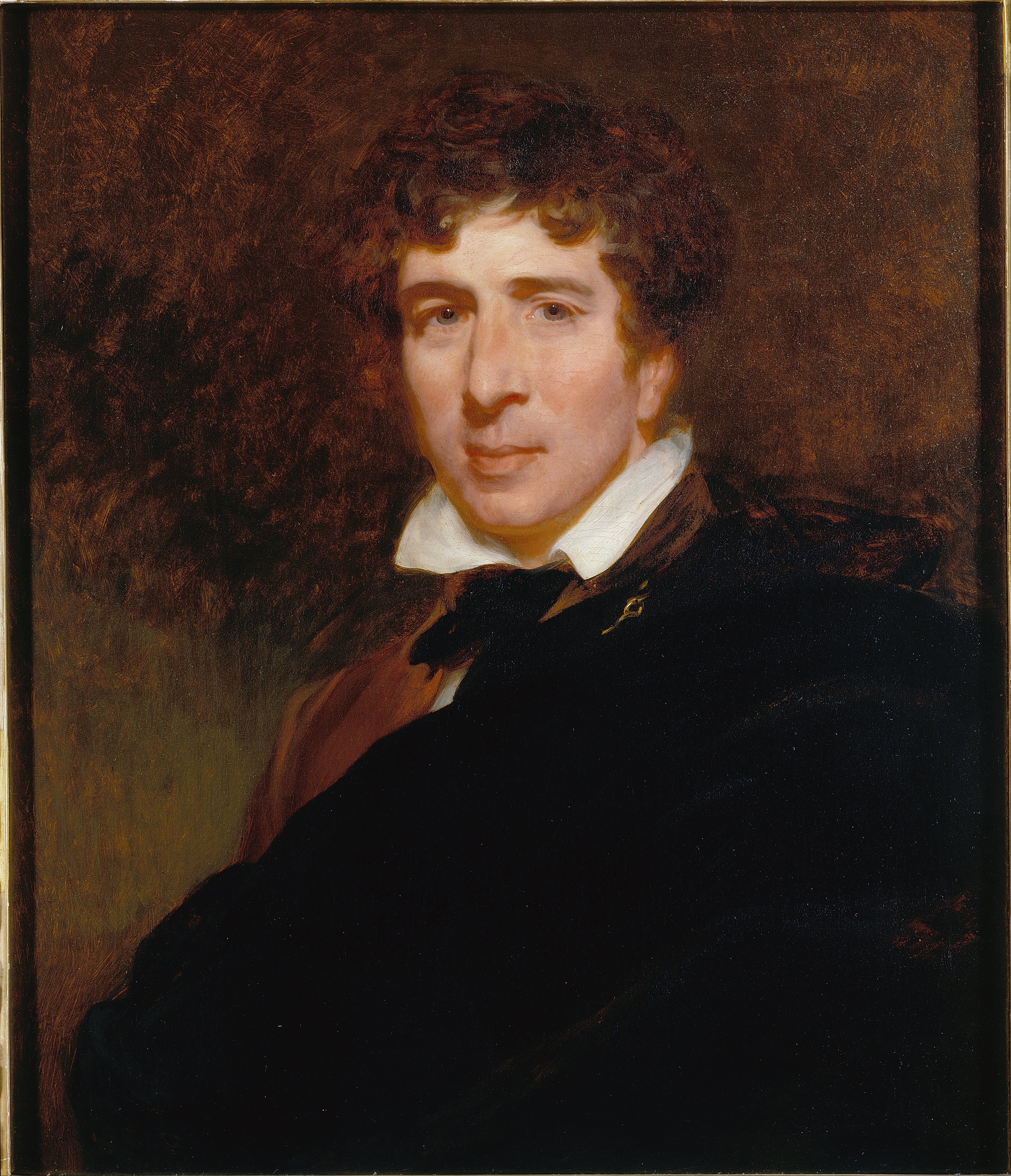
Portrait of Charles Kemble by Henry Perronet Briggs

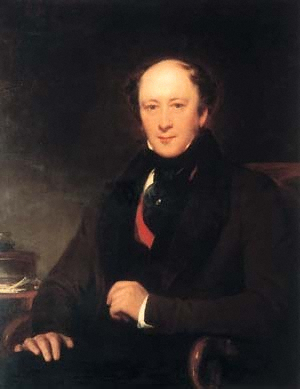
Portrait of James Planché by Henry Perronet Briggs

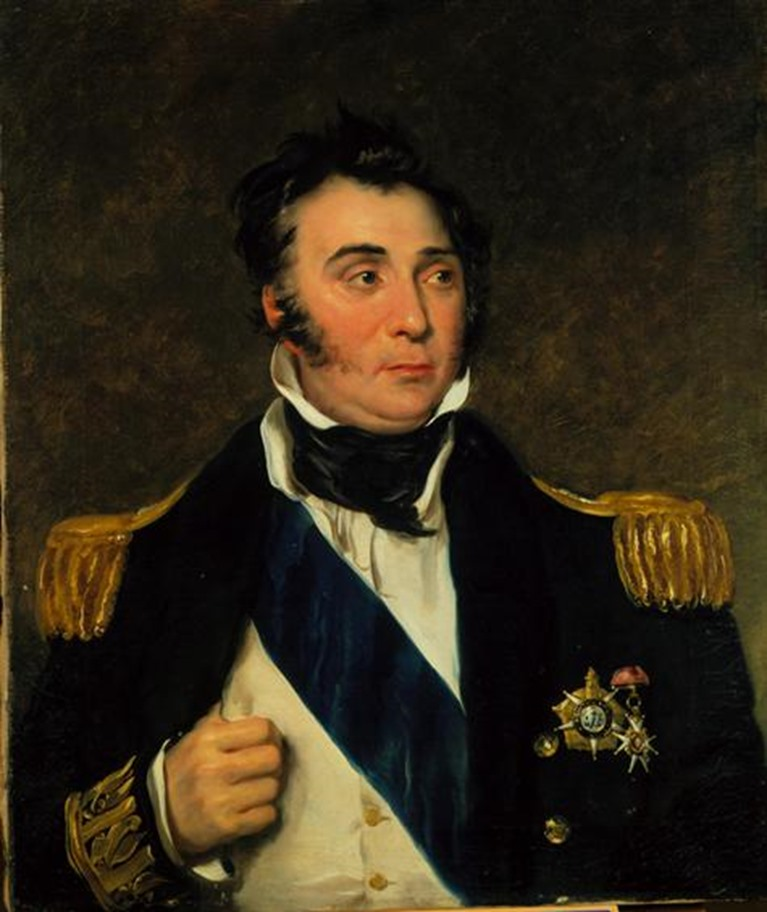
Portrait of Charles Napier by John Simpson

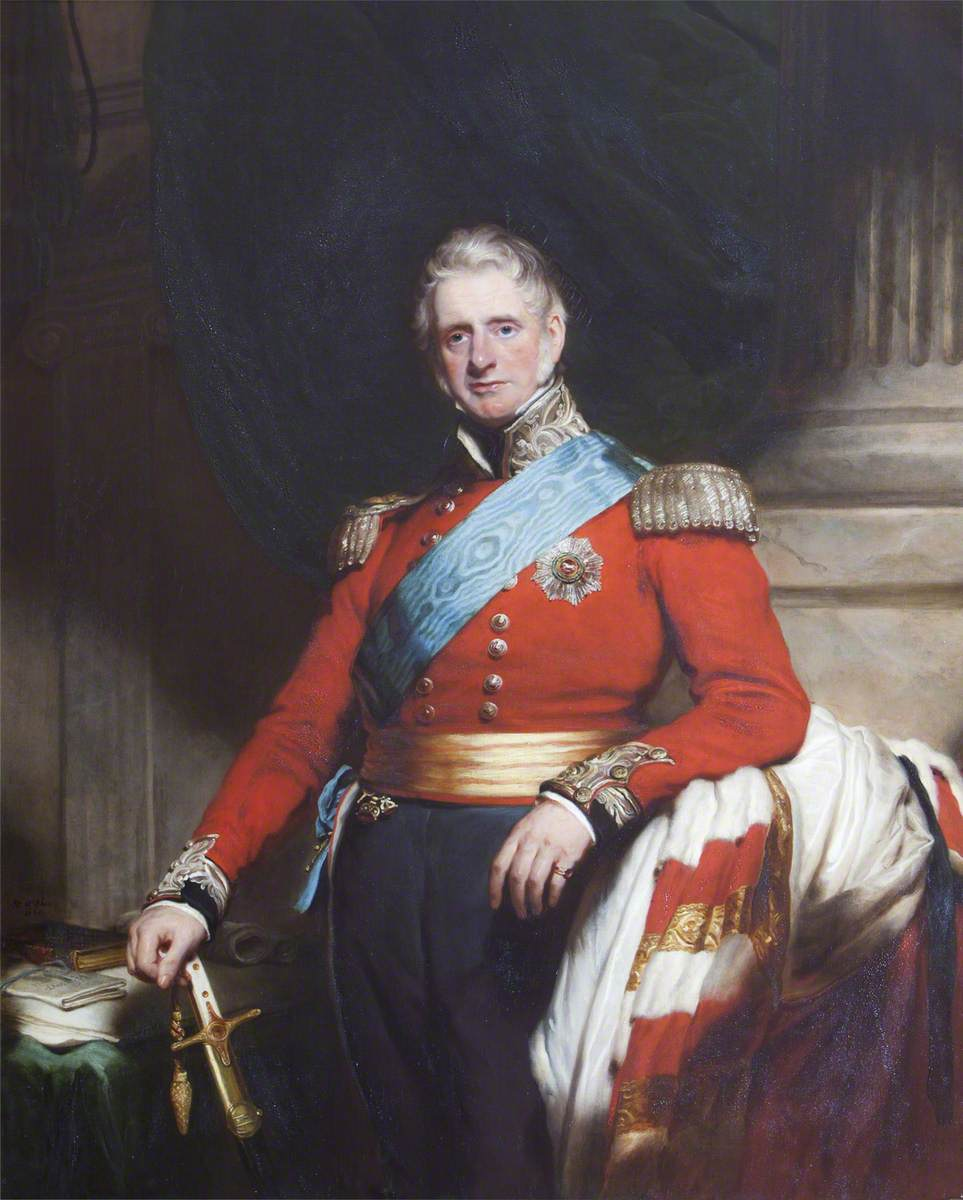
Portrait of Earl Brownlow by Martin Archer Shee

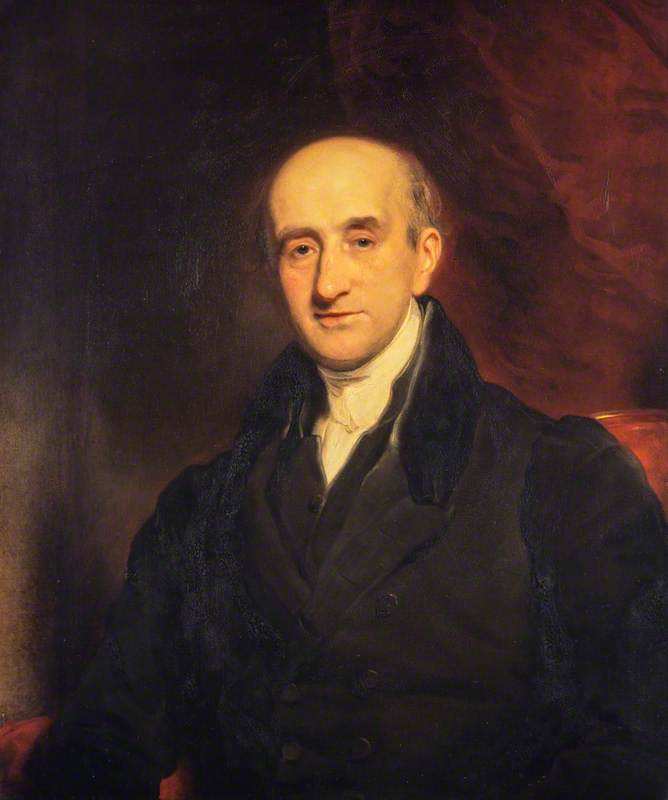
Portrait of Lord Meadowbank by Martin Archer Shee

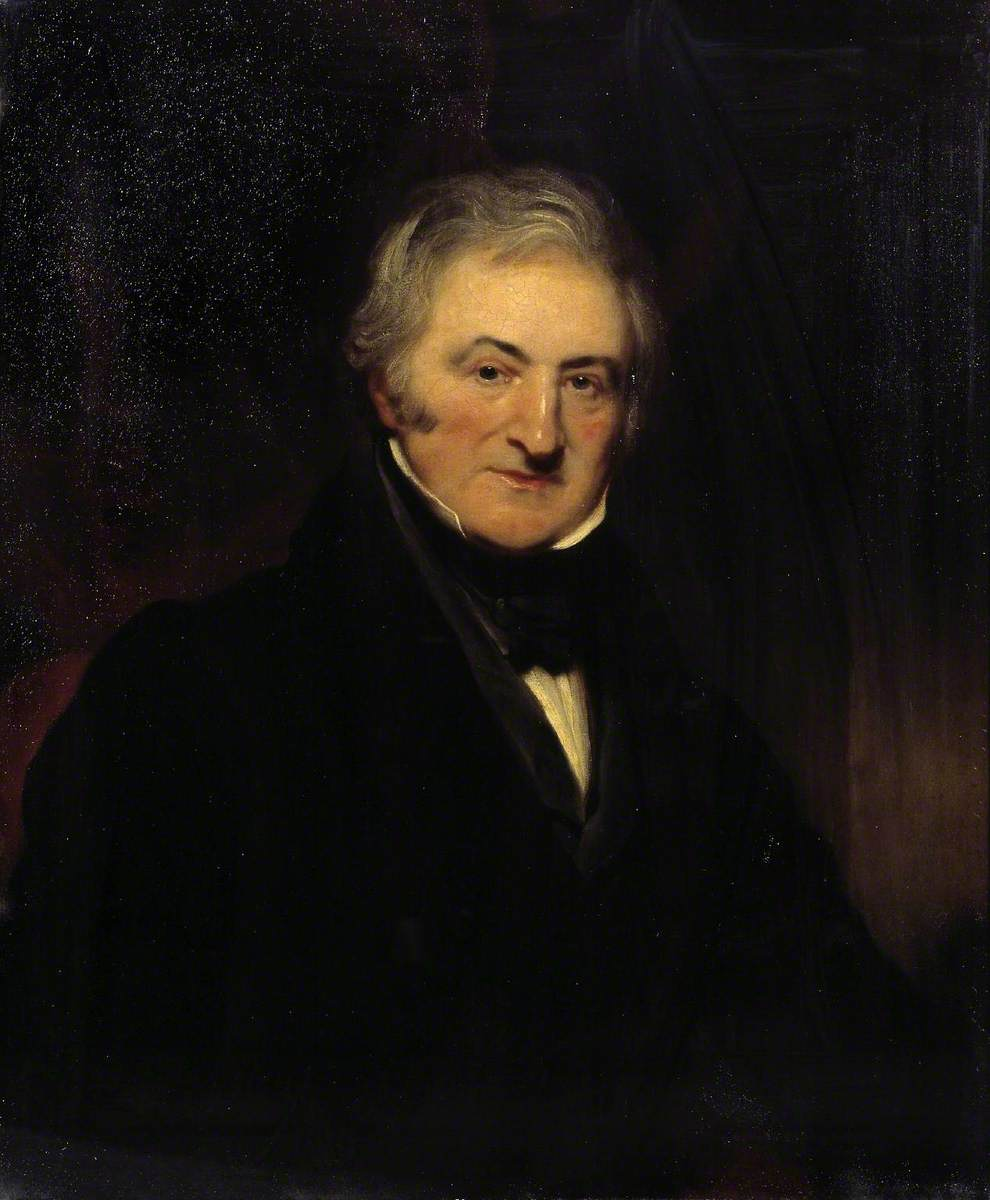
Portrait of Thomas Morton by Martin Archer Shee

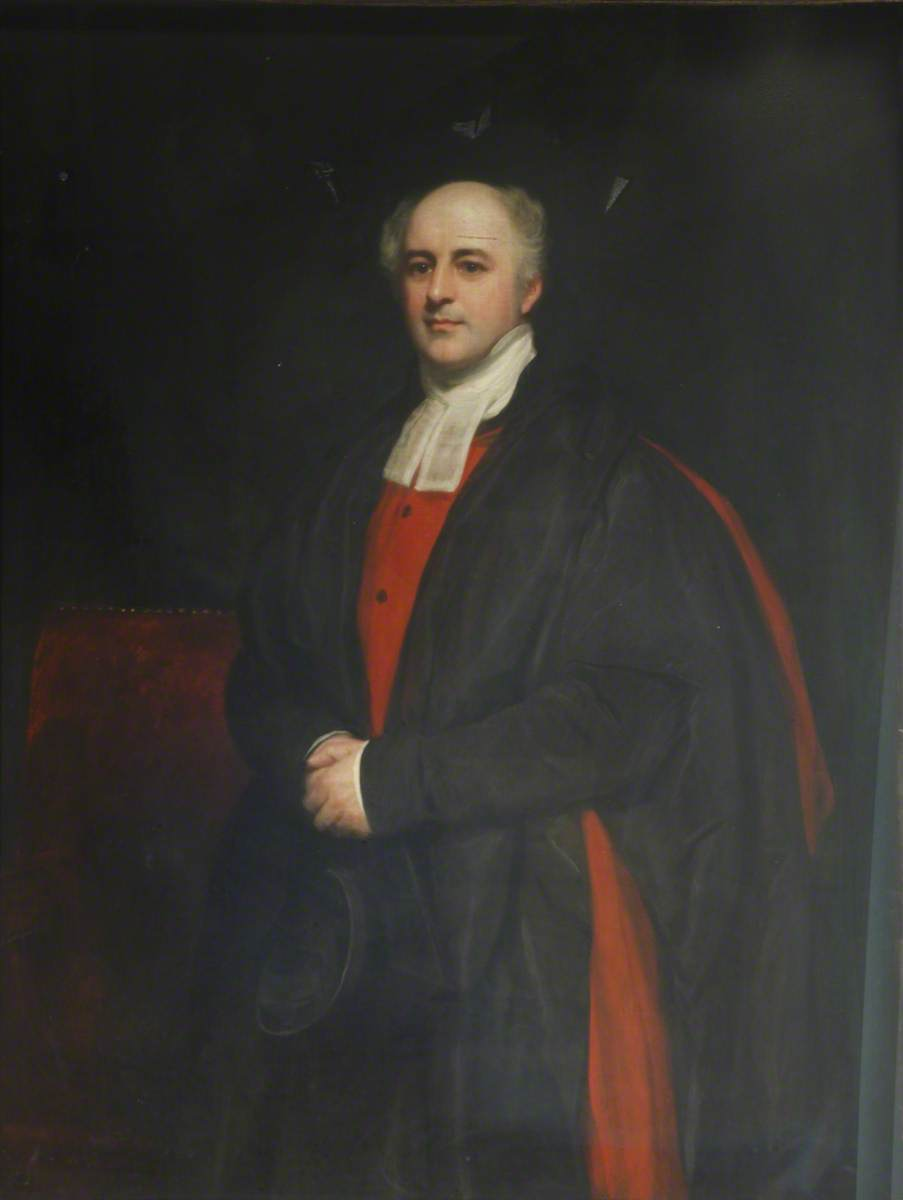
Portrait of Ashurst Gilbert by Thomas Phillips

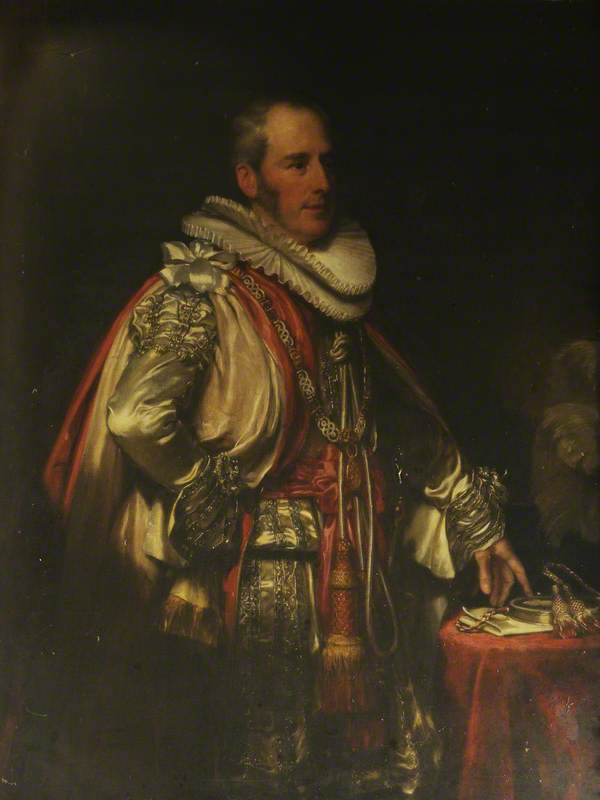
Portrait of Charles Bagot by Henry William Pickersgill

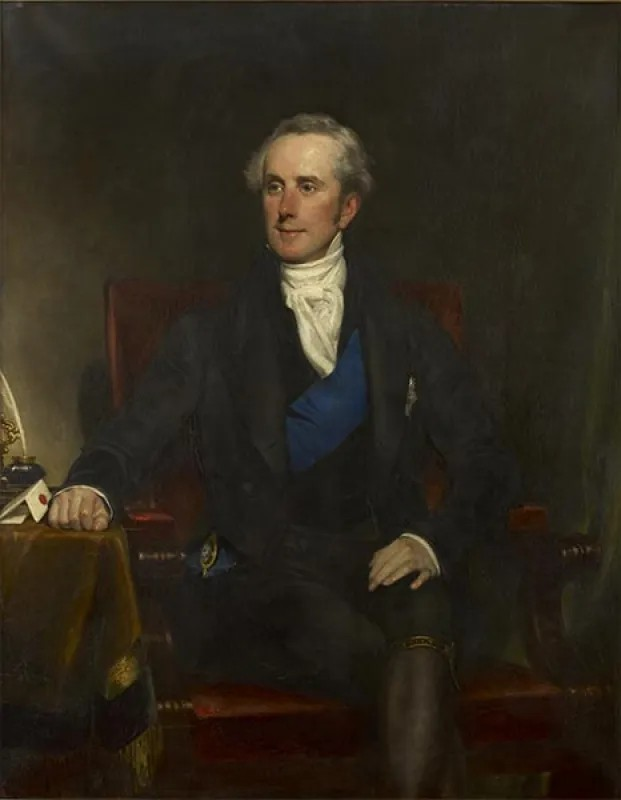
Portrait of the Duke of Newcastle by Henry William Pickersgill, 1835

== See also ==
- Salon of 1835, a contemporary French exhibition held at the Louvre in Paris

== Bibliography ==
- Bailey, Anthony. John Constable: A Kingdom of his Own. Random House, 2012.
- Hamilton, James. Constable: A Portrait. Hachette UK, 2022.
- Hamilton, James. Turner - A Life. Sceptre, 1998.
- Murray, Peter. Daniel Maclise, 1806-1870: Romancing the Past. Crawford Art Gallery, 2009.
- Thesing, William B. Caverns of Night: Coal Mines in Art, Literature, and Film. University of South Carolina Press, 2000.
- Tromans, Nicholas. David Wilkie: The People's Painter. Edinburgh University Press, 2007.
- Wellesley, Charles. Wellington Portrayed. Unicorn Press, 2014.
