= Venus and Her Satellites =

Painting by William Etty

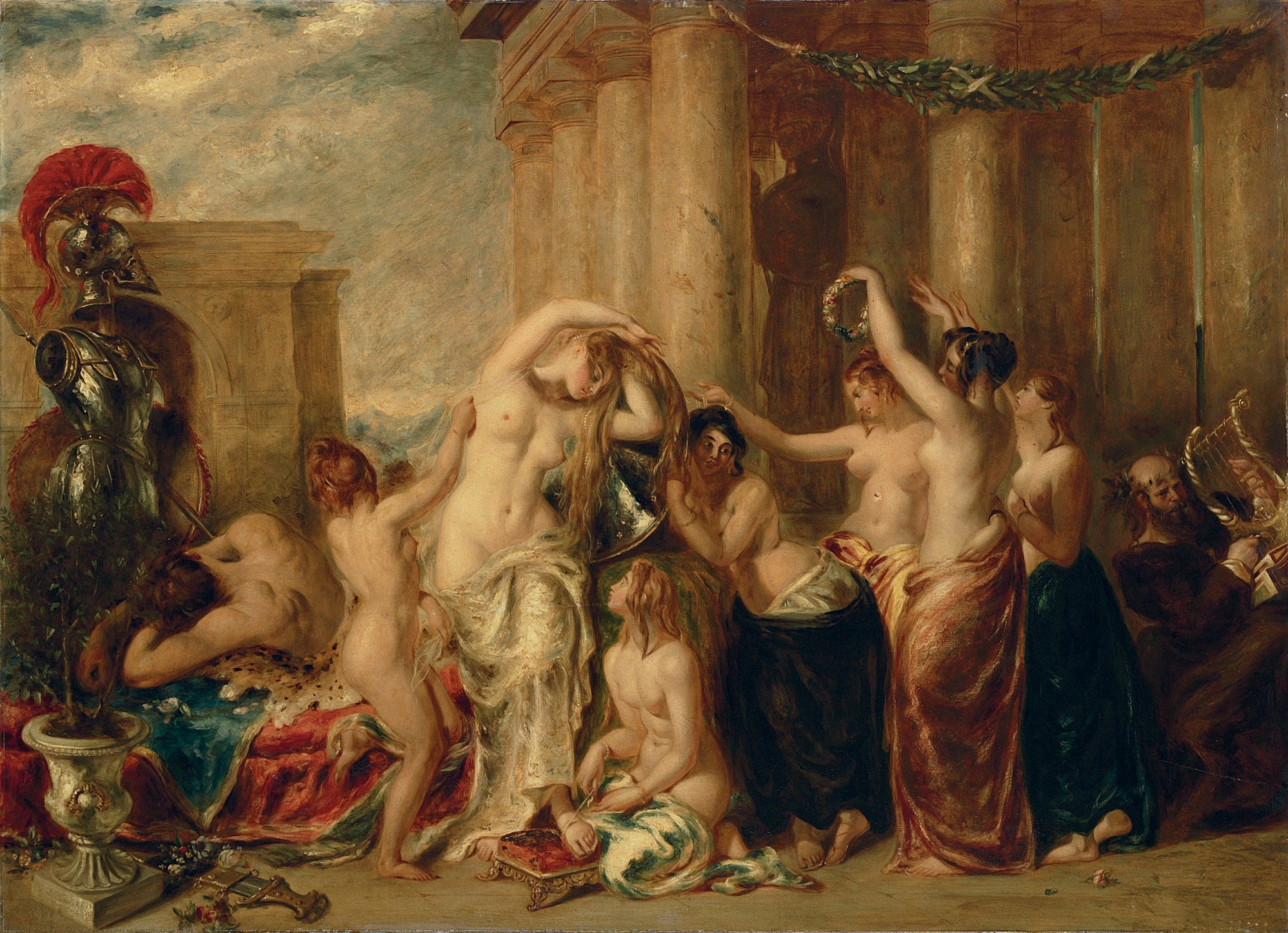
- Artist: William Etty
- Year: 1835
- Type: Oil on panel, history painting
- Dimensions: 88 cm × 116.5 cm (35 in × 45.9 in)
- Location: York Art Gallery, Yorkshire

Venus and Her Satellites is an 1835 oil painting by the British artist William Etty. Combining nude art and history painting, it depicts the goddess Venus attended by six of her handmaidens. On the left of the painting Mars is shown sleeping beneath a suit of armour.

The painting was displayed at the Royal Academy Exhibition of 1835 at Somerset House in London. A critic from The Times suggested "the painter has fallen into an egregious error. He mistakes the use of nudity in painting and presents in the most gross and literal manner the unhappy models of the Royal Academy for the exquisite idealities which Titian and other masters who have chosen similar subjects revelled". The painting is now in the collection of the York Art Gallery in Etty's native city. Another version is held by the Museo de Arte de Ponce in Puerto Rico.

Venus featured frequently in Etty's work. The following year he produced Venus and Her Doves, now in the Manchester Art Gallery

== Bibliography ==
- Kidson, Alex. Earlier British Paintings in the Lady Lever Art Gallery. 1999.
- Robinson, Leonard. William Etty: The Life and Art. McFarland, 2007.
- Smith, Alison. The Victorian Nude: Sexuality, Morality and Art. Manchester University Press, 1996.
