= Hay Barge off Greenwich =

Painting by Edward William Cooke

Hay Barge Off Greenwich
- Artist: Edward William Cooke
- Year: 1835
- Type: Oil on canvas, landscape painting
- Dimensions: 35.1 cm × 53.3 cm (13.8 in × 21.0 in)
- Location: National Maritime Museum, Greenwich

Hay Barge Off Greenwich is an 1835 landscape painting by the British artist Edward William Cooke. It depicts a barge filled with hay on the River Thames heading towards nearby London. Greenwich Hospital is prominent in the background. Large amounts of forage were needed to feed the horses of the capital, with hay coming from Kent and Suffolk to supply the demand.

The work was displayed at the Royal Academy Exhibition of 1835 at Somerset House in London. Today the painting is in the collection of the National Maritime Museum in Greenwich.

== Bibliography ==
- Aslet, Clive. The Story of Greenwich. Harvard University Press, 1999.
- Bonehill, John. (ed.) Art for the Nation: The Oil Paintings Collections of the National Maritime Museum. National Maritime Museum, 2006.
- Velten Hannah. Beastly London: A History of Animals in the City. Reaktion Books, 2023.
