= Pilgrims at Emmaus =

Painting by Titian

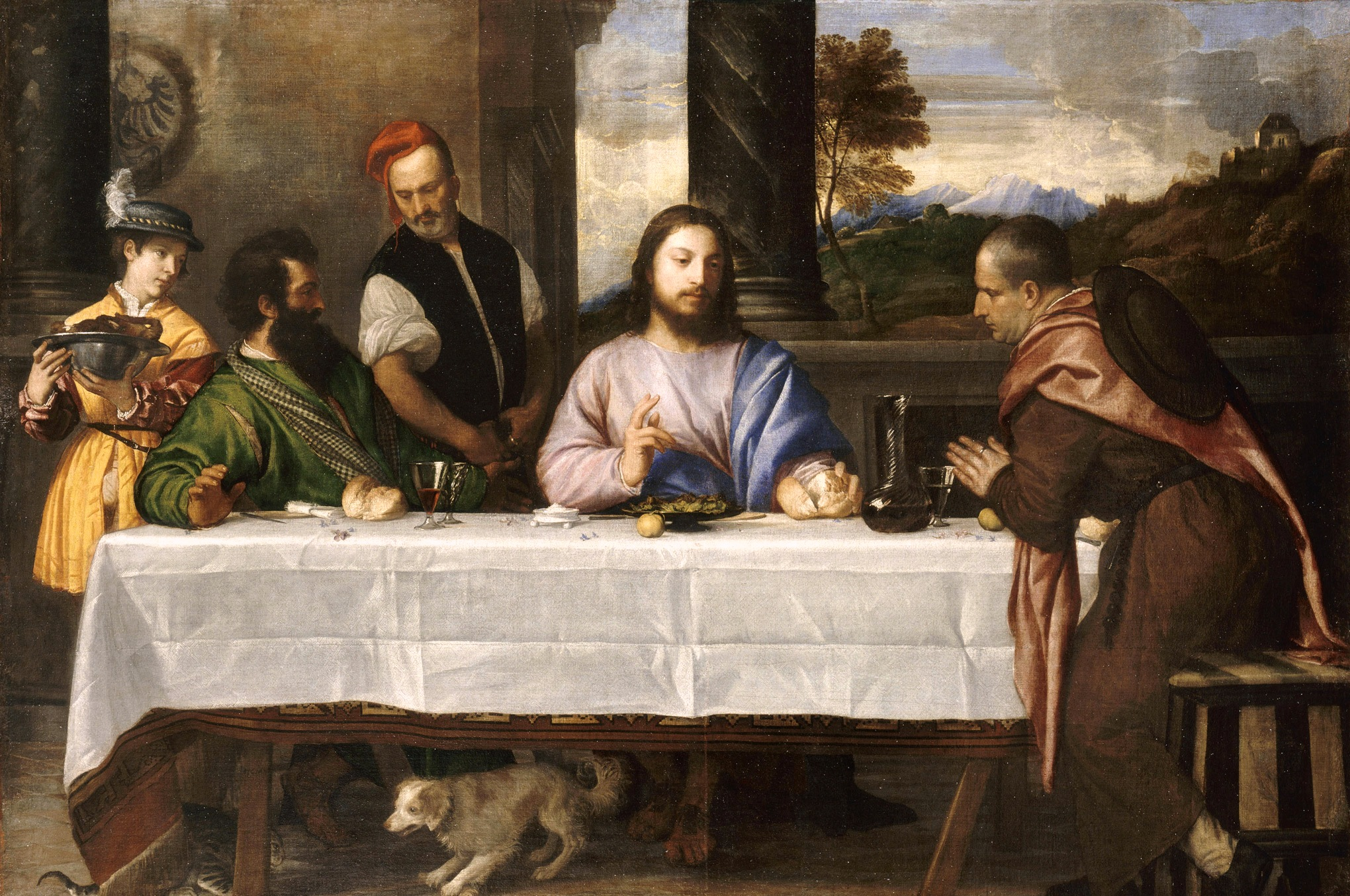
Pilgrims at Emmaus, 169 x 244 cm, c. 1533–1534 (Louvre, INV 746)

The Pilgrims at Emmaus (French: Les Pèlerins d'Emmaüs), also called the Supper at Emmaus (Le Souper à Emmaüs), is a painting by Titian, made about 1533 or 1534, which hangs in the Louvre in Paris.

== History ==
The date of this picture has been debated. Crowe and Cavalcaselle put it down to the year 1547 (about); Gronau and Ricketts think it was painted somewhat earlier, about 1543. The Louvre dates it even earlier, to between 1533 and 1534. It belonged to the group of Mantuan pictures bought in 1628 by Charles I. It entered the collections of Iabach and Louis XIV. In the eighteenth century it was in the sacristy of the Chapel at Versailles. A replica, which, from the sixteenth to the eighteenth century was preserved in the Ducal Palace, Venice, belongs now to the Earl of Yarborough.

== See also ==
- List of works by Titian

== Sources ==
- Gronau, Georg (1904). Titian. London: Duckworth and Co; New York: Charles Scribner's Sons. pp. 168–169, 283.
- Ricketts, Charles (1910). Titian. London: Methuen & Co. Ltd. pp. 105, 106, 115, 117, 179.
- "Les Pèlerins d'Emmaüs". Collections: Louvre. 2019. Retrieved 18 October 2022.
