= 1758 in art =

Events from the year 1758 in art.

== Events ==
- Charles Theodore, Elector of Bavaria, establishes a Kupferstich- und Zeichnungskabinett in the Mannheim Palace, predecessor of the Staatliche Graphische Sammlung München.

== Works ==
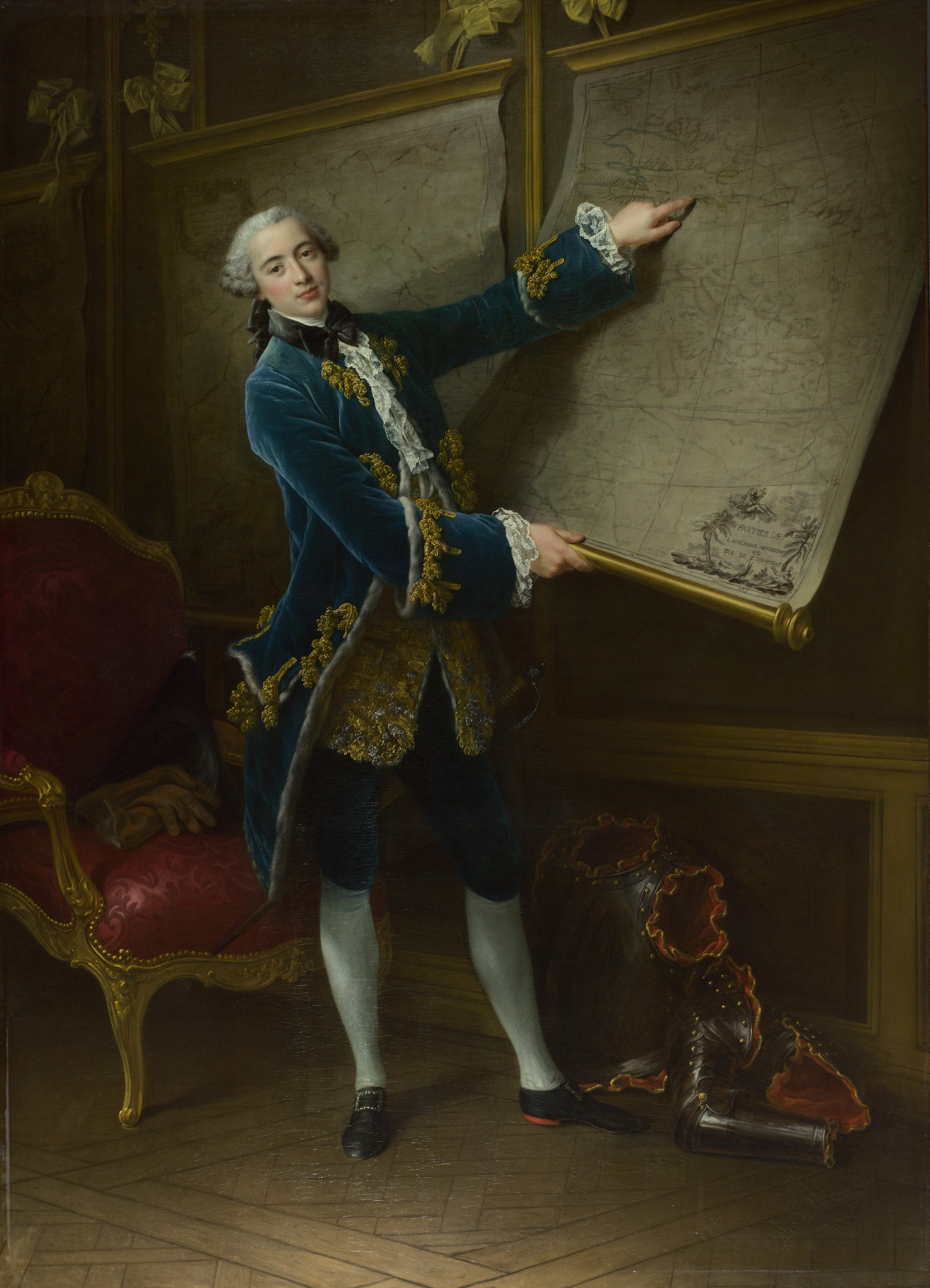
Portrait of the Comte de Vaudreuil by François-Hubert Drouais

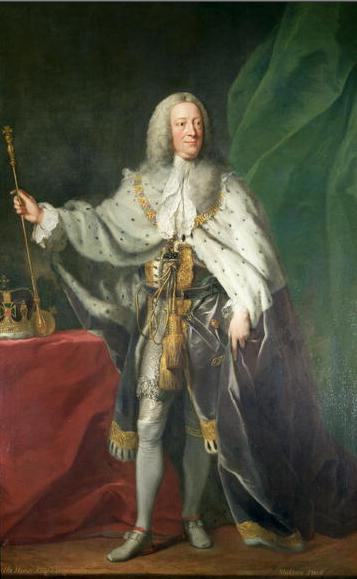
George II by Shackleton – this painting was given by the artist in May 1758 to the Foundling Hospital in London, in return for which he was elected a governor and guardian.

- Pompeo Batoni
  - Portrait of the Earl of Northampton
  - Portrait of Pope Clement
  - Portrait of Sir Wyndham Knatchbull-Wyndham
- Bernardo Bellotto
  - The Fortress of Königstein from the North
  - The Fortress of Königstein Courtyard with the Brunnenhaus
- François-Hubert Drouais
  - The Comte and Chevalier de Choiseul as Savoyards
  - Portrait of the Comte de Vaudreuil
- Joshua Reynolds – Charles Lennox, 3rd Duke of Richmond
- Louis-François Roubiliac – Statue of Shakespeare
- John Shackleton – George II
- Samuel Scott – Old London Bridge

== Births ==
- March 14 – Franz Bauer, Austrian microscopist and botanical artist (died 1840)
- April 4
  - John Hoppner, English portrait painter (died 1810)
  - Pierre-Paul Prud'hon, French painter (died 1823)
- June 18 – Robert Bowyer, English miniature painter and publisher (died 1834)
- June 19 – Raffaello Sanzio Morghen, Italian engraver (died 1833)
- August 14 – Carle Vernet, French painter (died 1835)
- September 9 – Alexander Nasmyth, Scottish painter (died 1840)
- October 22 - Friedrich Rehberg, German portrait and historical painter (died 1835)
- December 31 – Johann Heinrich Bleuler, Swiss painter (died 1823)
- date unknown
  - William Billingsley, English painter of porcelain (died 1828)
  - James Fittler, English engraver (died 1835)
  - Hyewon, Korean painter of the Joseon Dynasty (died c. 1814)
  - Moritz Kellerhoven, Austrian painter (died 1830)
  - Ryōkan, Japanese Sōtō Zen Buddhist monk poet and calligrapher (died 1831)
  - (b. 1756/1758) – Francesco Piranesi, Italian engraver and architect (died 1810)

== Deaths ==
- February 28 – Francesco Maria Raineri, Italian sculptor of battle scenes, landscapes, and vedute with historical or mythologic figures (born 1676)
- March 2 – Johann Baptist Zimmermann, German painter and a prime stucco plasterer during the Baroque (born 1680)
- June 27 – Michelangelo Unterberger, Austrian painter of religious themes (born 1695)
- August - François Hutin, French painter, sculptor and engraver (born 1686)
- August 24 – Bartolomeo Nazari, Italian portraitist of the late-Baroque (born 1693)
- September 9 – Isak Wacklin, Finnish painter (born 1720)
- October – Michael Ford, Irish mezzotint engraver (born unknown)
- October 19 – Agostino Masucci, Italian painter of the late-Baroque or Rococo period (born 1691)
- date unknown
  - Ciro Adolfi, Italian painter of the Baroque period (born 1683)
  - George Bickham the Elder, English writing master and engraver (born 1684)
  - Elizabeth Blackwell, Scottish botanical illustrator and author (born 1700)
  - Giuseppe Dallamano, Italian painter of quadratura in Turin (born 1679)
  - Alonso Miguel de Tovar, Spanish painter of the late-Baroque or Rococo period (born 1678)
