= 1835 in art =

Events from the year 1835 in art.

== Events ==
- May 4 – The Royal Academy Exhibition of 1835 opens at Somerset House in London.
- June 6 – Augustus Welby Northmore Pugin is received into the Roman Catholic Church.
- June – Caspar David Friedrich suffers his first stroke, which restricts his ability to paint in oils.
- August – H. Fox Talbot exposes the world's first known photographic negatives at Lacock Abbey in England.
- Victor Cousin introduces the expression "L'art pour l'art" ("Art for art's sake").
- Marie Tussaud establishes the first permanent Madame Tussauds wax museum in London.
- Salon of 1835 in Paris.

== Publications ==
- George Field – Chromatography; or, a Treatise on Colours and Pigments, and of their Powers in Painting.

== Works ==
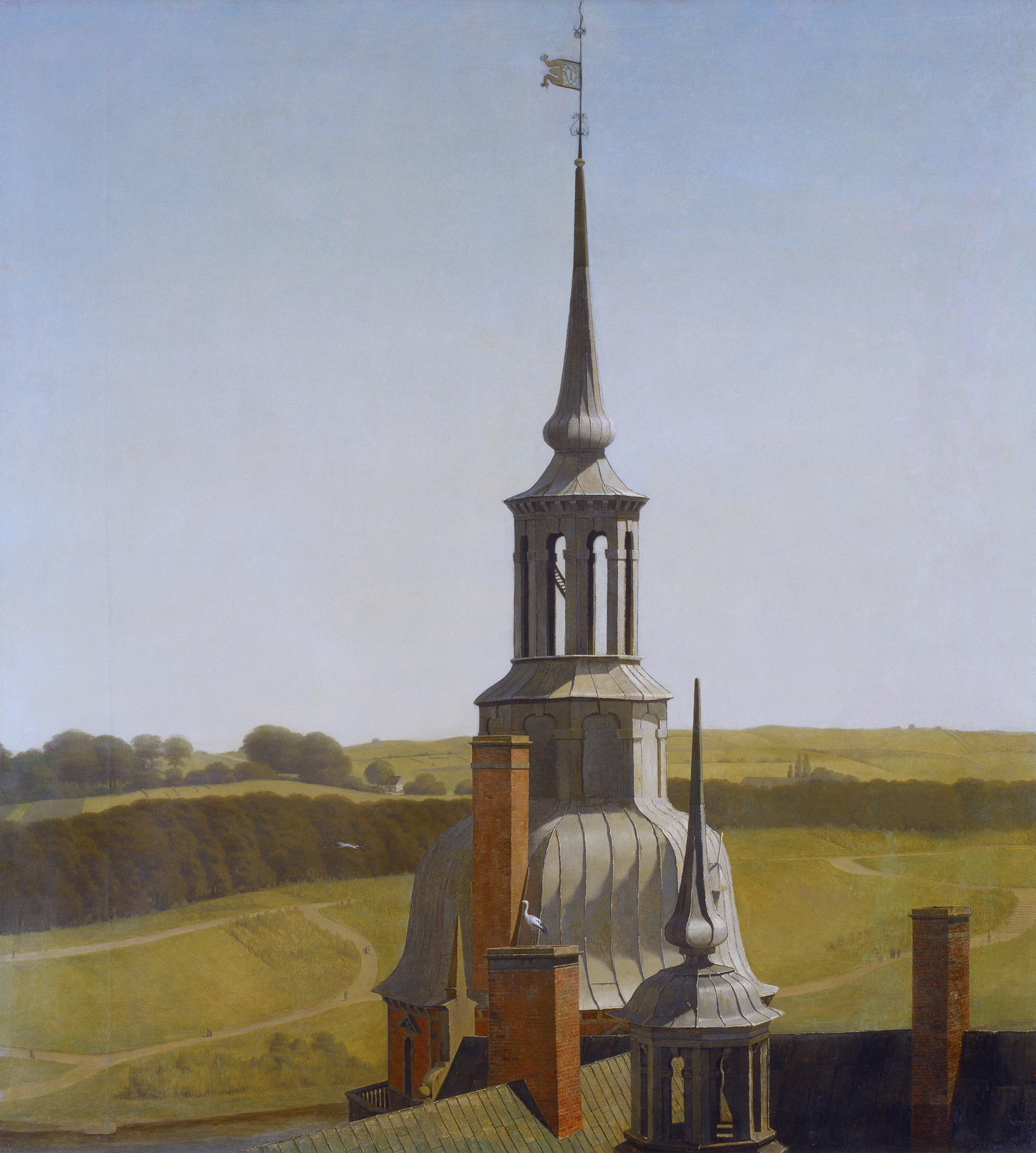
Christen Købke – One of the Small Towers on Frederiksborg Castle

- François Bouchot – The Battle of Zurich
- Théodore Chassériau
  - Aline Chassériau
  - Portrait of Prosper Marilhat
  - Self-portrait
- William Collins –
  - Barmouth Sands
  - The Stray Kitten
- Léon Cogniet – The Egyptian Expedition Under the Command of Bonaparte (ceiling at Musée du Louvre, Paris)
- John Constable
  - The Valley Farm
  - Stonehenge
- Edward William Cooke – Hay Barge off Greenwich
- Jean-Baptiste-Camille Corot – Venise, La Piazetta
- Eugène Delacroix – Portrait of Léon Riesener
- Paul Delaroche – Strafford Led to Execution
- Caspar David Friedrich
  - The Giant Mountains
  - The Stages of Life
- Christen Købke
  - Frederiksborg Palace in the Evening Light
  - One of the Small Towers on Frederiksborg Castle
- Daniel Maclise – The Chivalric Vow of the Ladies of the Peacock
- William Mulready – The Toy Seller
- James Arthur O'Connor – The Poachers
- John Orlando Parry – The Poster Man
- Henry Pether – Twickenham by Moonlight
- Ary Scheffer – Francesca da Rimini and Paolo Malatesta appraised by Dante and Virgil (original version)
- J. M. W. Turner
  - The Burning of the Houses of Lords and Commons, 16th October, 1834
  - A Disaster at Sea
  - Keelmen Heaving in Coals by Moonlight
  - Line Fishing, Off Hastings
- Ferdinand Georg Waldmüller – Wolfgangsee
- Horace Vernet – Napoleon at the Battle of Friedland

== Births ==
- January 3 – Fanny Cornforth, born Sarah Cox, English artists' model (died 1909)
- March 31 – John La Farge, American painter and stained-glass artist (died 1910)
- May 11 – Stefano Bruzzi, Italian painter (died 1911)
- June 15 – Adah Isaacs Menken, American actress, painter and poet (died 1868)
- June 23 – Fanny Eaton, Jamaican-born artists' model (died 1924)
- July 2 – George Dunlop Leslie, English genre painter (died 1921)
- December 9 – Raffaele Belliazzi, Italian sculptor (died 1917)
- date unknown – Stanisław Chlebowski, Polish painter especially of oriental themes (died 1884)

== Deaths ==
- February 13 – Jean-Baptiste Roman, French sculptor (born 1792)
- March 20 – Louis Léopold Robert, Swiss painter (born 1794)
- April 1 – Bartolomeo Pinelli, Italian illustrator and engraver (born 1771)
- April 4 – Friedrich August von Klinkowström, German artist, author and teacher (born 1778)
- April 5 – Ivan Martos, Russian-Ukrainian sculptor and art teacher (born 1754)
- May 1 – Elkanah Tisdale, American engraver, miniature painter and cartoonist (born 1768)
- May 15 – Pauline Auzou, French painter (born 1775)
- June 21 – Jan Rustem, Turkish-born portrait painter (born 1762)
- June 25 – Antoine-Jean Gros, French painter (born 1771)
- August 20 – Friedrich Rehberg, German portrait and historical painter (born 1758)
- October 23 – Thomas Heaphy, English watercolour and portrait painter (born 1775)
- November 3 – Giacomo Guardi, Italian veduta painter (born 1764)
- November 17 – Carle Vernet, French painter (born 1758)
- December 1 – Charles Hayter, English painter (born 1761)
- December 2 – James Fittler, English engraver (born 1758)
