= Canaletto (disambiguation) =

Giovanni Antonio Canal or Canaletto (1697–1768) was a Venetian painter famous for his landscapes.

Canaletto may also refer to:

- Bernardo Bellotto or Canaletto (1721–1780), Venetian urban landscape painter, nephew and pupil of Canal, famous for his vedutes of Warsaw and Dresden
- 8123 Canaletto, a Main-Belt asteroid
