= 1764 Polish–Lithuanian royal election =

Royal election in the Polish–Lithuanian Commonwealth

1764 Polish-Lithuanian Free election
- September 7, 1764

Election of the King of Poland and Grand Duke of Lithuania
- Turnout: 5,584 ▼
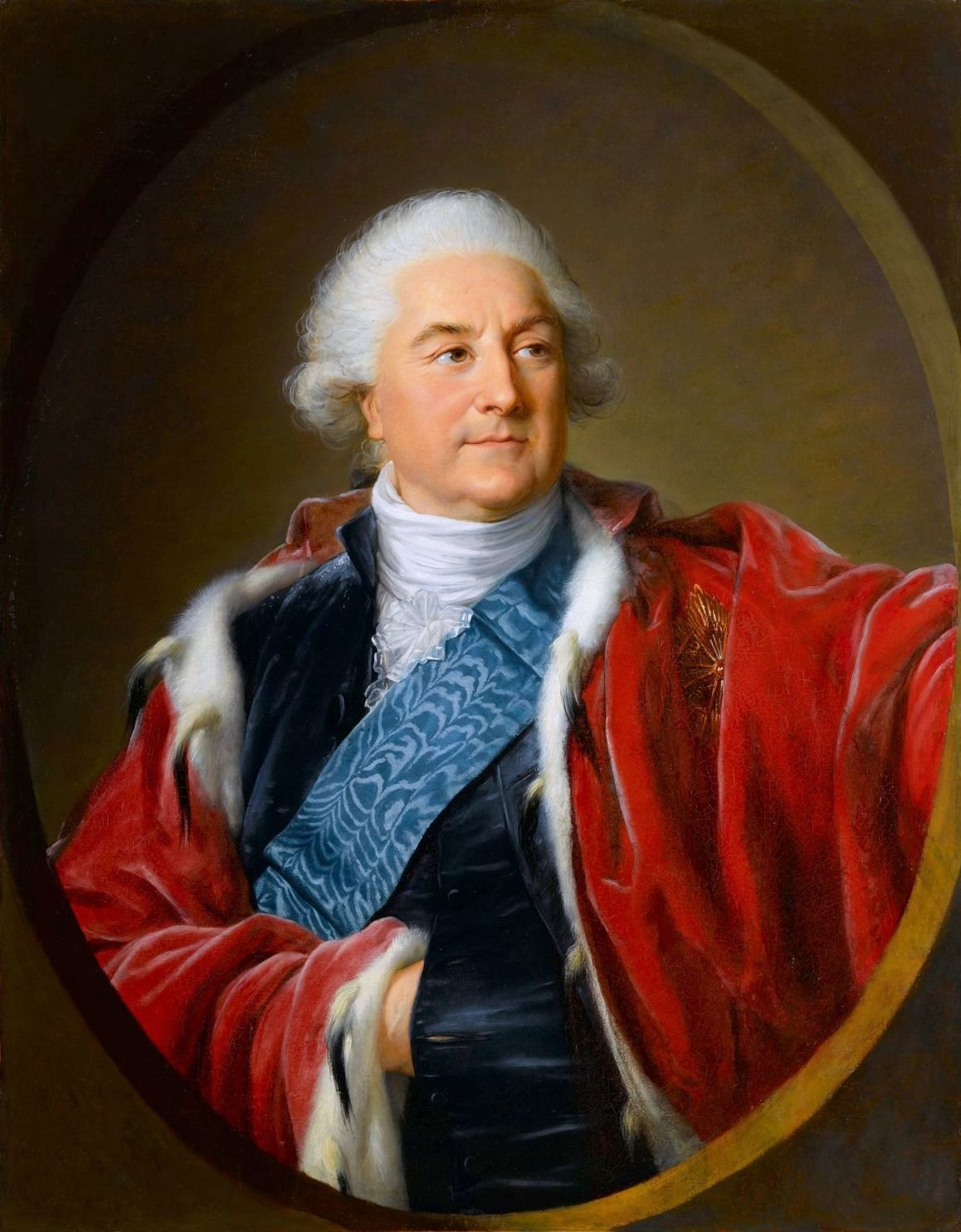

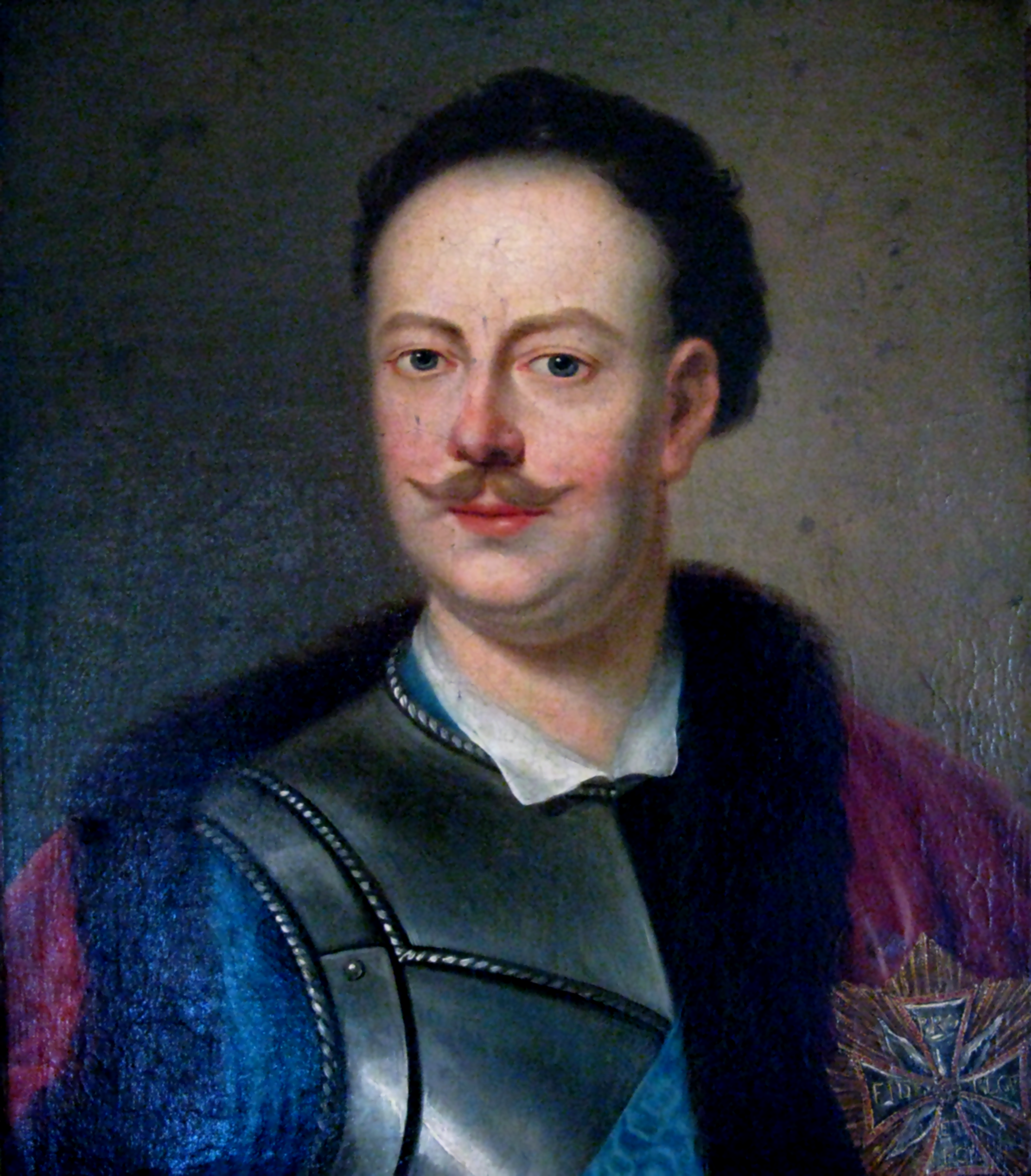

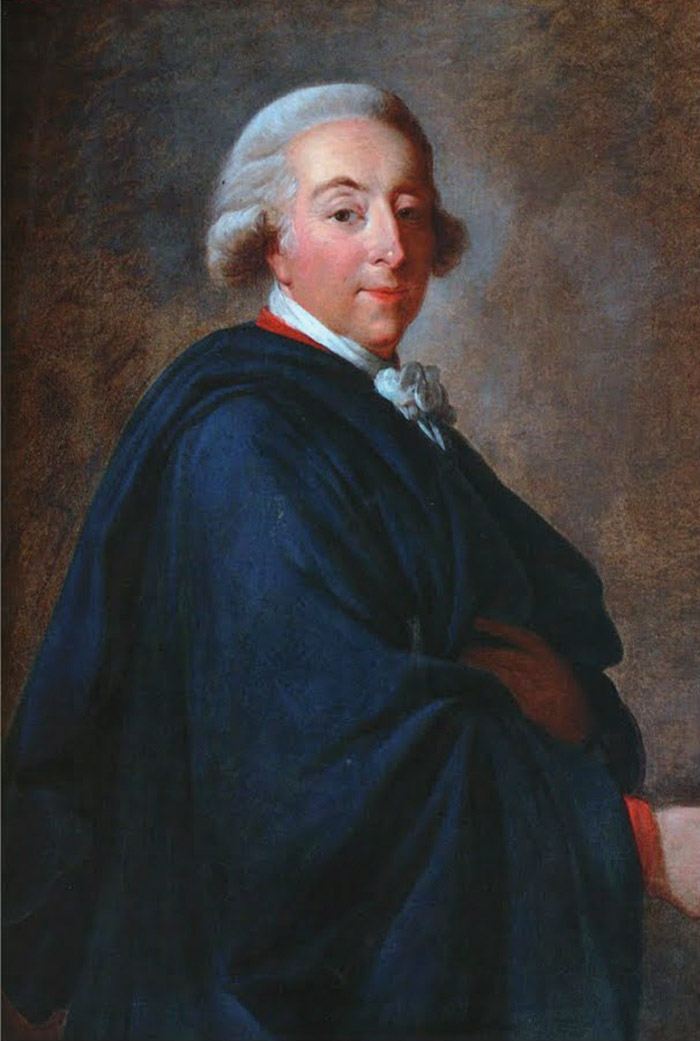
Candidate	Stanisław August Poniatowski	Jan Klemens Branicki	Adam Kazimierz Czartoryski
Faction	Familia	Republicans	Familia
Electoral vote	5,584
Percentage	100%
King before election
Augustus III
Elected King
Stanisław II Augustus

The 1764 Polish–Lithuanian royal election was an election to decide on the new candidate for the Polish–Lithuanian throne.

== Background ==
The Seven Years' War, which ended in 1763, established a new pattern of political alliances in Europe. The Kingdom of Prussia, the Kingdom of Great Britain and the Russian Empire emerged as great powers, while the position of Austria, France, Spain, Sweden and the Ottoman Empire was weakened. As a result of the war, the Russian Empress, Catherine the Great, was in almost complete control of the Polish–Lithuanian Commonwealth. Catherine was supported by the Prussian monarch, Frederick the Great, who hoped to eventually annex Polish provinces of Royal Prussia and Greater Poland.

== History ==
After the death of Augustus III of Poland, two dominant political camps of Poland expressed their interest to the Polish throne. The Potocki family promoted Hetman Jan Klemens Branicki, while the Czartoryski family backed its leader, Duke Adam Kazimierz Czartoryski. Under pressure from Catherine, the Czartoryskis, however, withdrew the candidacy of Adam Kazimierz, and replaced him with Stolnik from the Grand Duchy of Lithuania, Stanisław August Poniatowski, who had been one of Catherine’s lovers. Russian support however, did not mean that Poniatowski would automatically become new monarch of the Commonwealth. Polish–Lithuanian szlachta was at that time strongly anti-Russian, and in case of a free election, Branicki’s victory was secure.

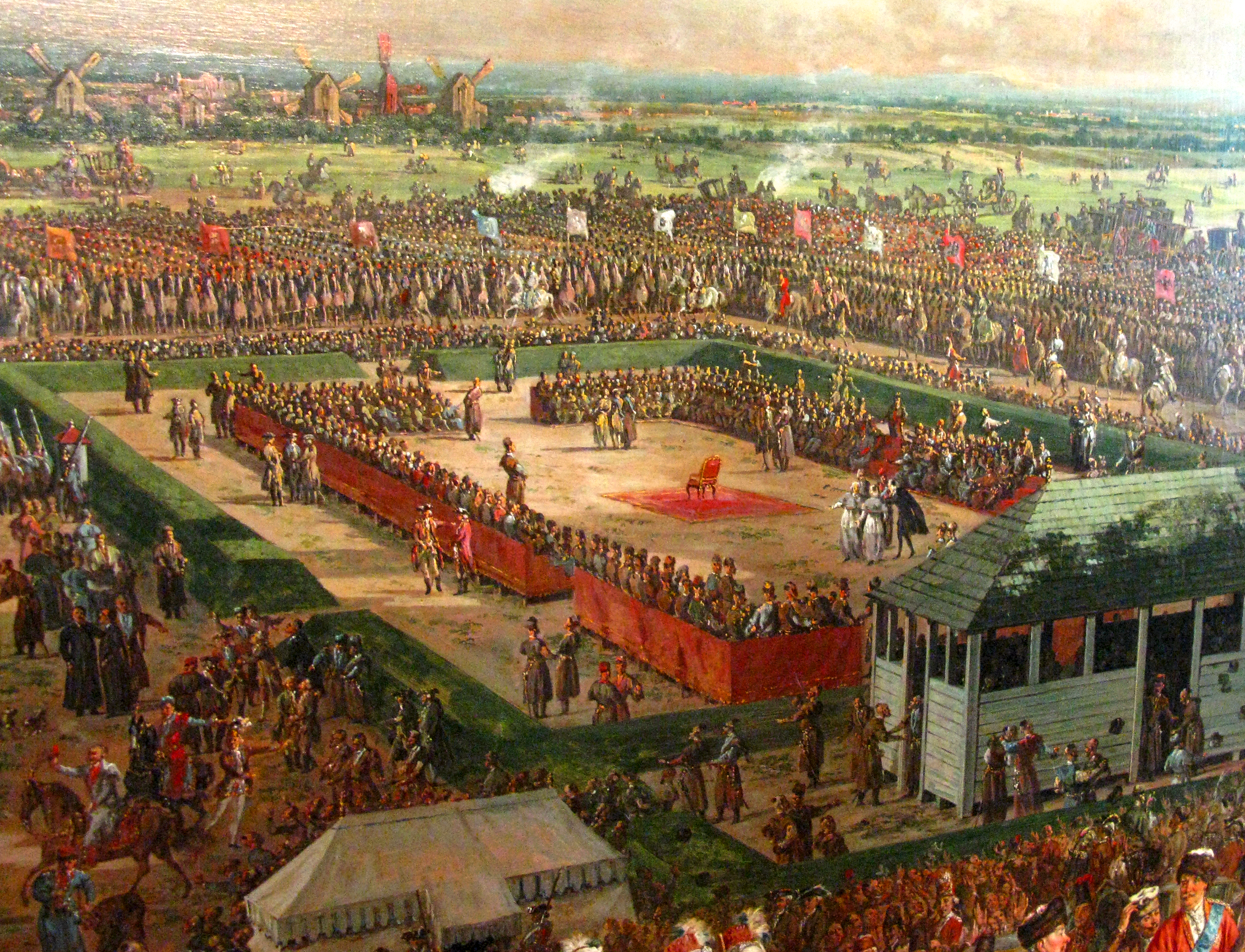
Election of Stanisław August Poniatowski in 1764

The Czartoryski family, fearing a civil war, asked the Russian empress for military assistance. They were not aware of the fact that the Russians and their Prussian allies had previously signed a secret pact, which stipulated the use of a military force to support Poniatowski. As early as October 17, 1763, Catherine wrote a letter to Frederick, in which she expressed the opinion that from all candidates to the Polish crown, Poniatowski was the least popular one, therefore, he would be most grateful to those who had made him monarch. On April 11, 1764, Russia and Prussia signed the pact, in which both sides pledged to promote Poniatowski. He was the most convenient candidate for the Russians, as a former lover of Catherine, he would guarantee submission to his Russian sponsor. The Czartoryskis, who called themselves Familia, regarded themselves as patriots, who saw the need for urgent reforms for the declining Commonwealth. At the same time, they were of the opinion that all reforms were to be carried out with Russian permission only, as the Russian Empire was the dominant force in Central and Eastern Europe. Therefore, leaders of the Familia, Andrzej Zamoyski and August Aleksander Czartoryski urged Catherine to send the Russian army. The empress did so, issuing an announcement that she wanted to protect all freedoms of the Commonwealth. The Potockis, who called themselves the Republicans, on the other hand, supported the notion of Golden Liberty, together with liberum veto.

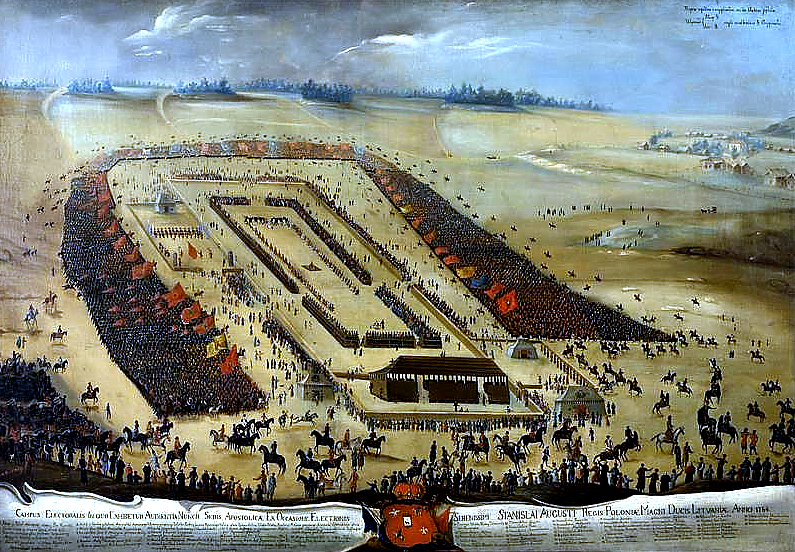
Audience of Papal Nuncio during the election of Stanisław August Poniatowski

The first clash between the two camps took place during the Convocation Sejm, which began on May 7, 1764. The Republicans vetoed all bills brought forward by the Czartoryskis. The Russian army, stationed near Warsaw, intervened and ordered the Republicans to leave the Polish capital. Remaining Sejm deputies called a confederation, but failed to carry out any significant changes in the government of the Commonwealth. Poniatowski himself was an envoy to the Convocation Sejm, he represented the Land of Warsaw.

The Election Sejm, which as usual took place in early September 1764 in Wola near Warsaw, was attended by some 5,000 nobles. Poniatowski, backed by Russian and Prussian envoys, as well as diplomats from Great Britain and Denmark–Norway, was unanimously elected on September 7. On September 13 Poniatowski signed the pacta conventa, in which he pledged to marry a Roman Catholic.

On November 25, 1764, following the order of Catherine the Great, Primate Władysław Aleksander Łubieński crowned Poniatowski as King of Poland. The ceremony took place at St. John's Archcathedral, Warsaw, and the new king, to dismay of conservatives, did not put on traditional Polish clothes, preferring to wear instead a 16th-century Spanish outfit.

== Aftermath ==
Poniatowski’s election was not at first recognized by several European states, such as France, Austria and the Ottoman Empire, which saw the new monarch as Catherine’s tool. This changed after several interventions of Russian and Prussian diplomats.

== See also ==
- History of Poland in the Early Modern era (1569–1795)
- Royal elections in Poland
- Golden Liberty
- Henrician Articles
- The Election of Stanisław August

== Sources ==
- U. Augustyniak, Historia Polski 1572–1795, Warszawa 2008
- M. Markiewicz, Historia Polski 1494–1795, Kraków 2002
