= Piazza della Rotonda and the Pantheon =

1799 painting by Bernardo Bellotto

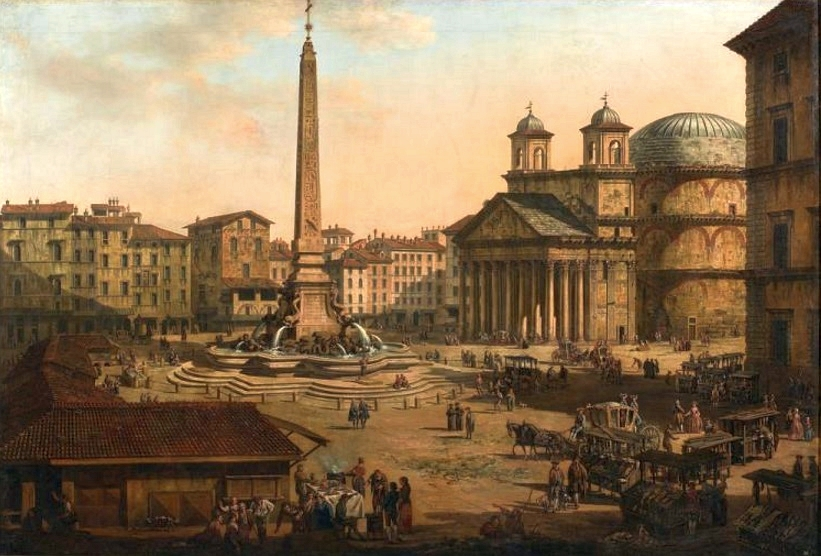
- Artist: Bernardo Bellotto
- Year: 1769
- Medium: oil on canvas
- Dimensions: 116 cm × 173 cm (46 in × 68 in)
- Location: Pushkin Museum; Moscow

Piazza della Rotonda and the Pantheon is an oil-on-canvas cityscape painting by the Italian painter Bernardo Bellotto and his son Lorenzo, from 1769, based on an engraving by Piranesi. It and its pair View of the Forum in Rome are both in the Pushkin Museum, in Moscow. It shows the Piazza della Rotonda and the Pantheon, in Rome.

== History ==
Stanisław August Poniatowski commissioned the work from Bellotto – a court painter for him since 1767 – as part of a series of views of Rome for his royal residence, Ujazdów Palace (at Ujazdów, near Warsaw). The set was split up in 1819, with some of them taken out of Poland. Two paintings from the series were sold at Christie's for $12.3 million.

Four ended up in Russia in the Stepanovskoye-Volosovo estate of the Kurakin family. They were seized / nationalized from Elizaveta Naryshkina (née Princess Kurakina) by the Soviet state on the October Revolution and were first placed in the Tretyakov Gallery, then other museums. Two of the four are now in the Pushkin Museum.
