= The Election of Stanisław August =

Painting by Bernardo Bellotto

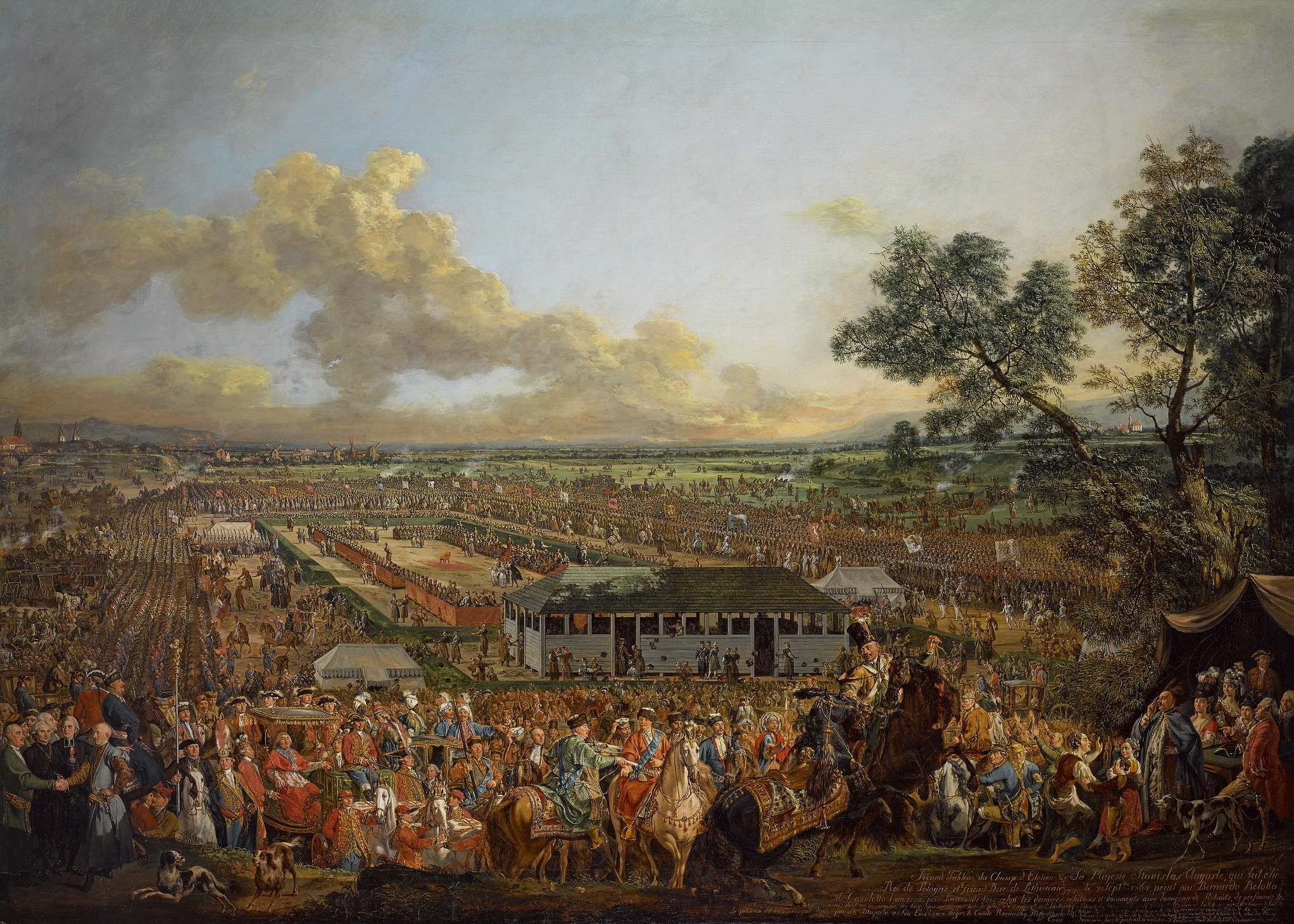
- Artist: Bernardo Bellotto
- Year: 1778
- Medium: oil on canvas
- Dimensions: 175 cm × 250 cm (69 in × 98 in)
- Location: Royal Castle; Warsaw

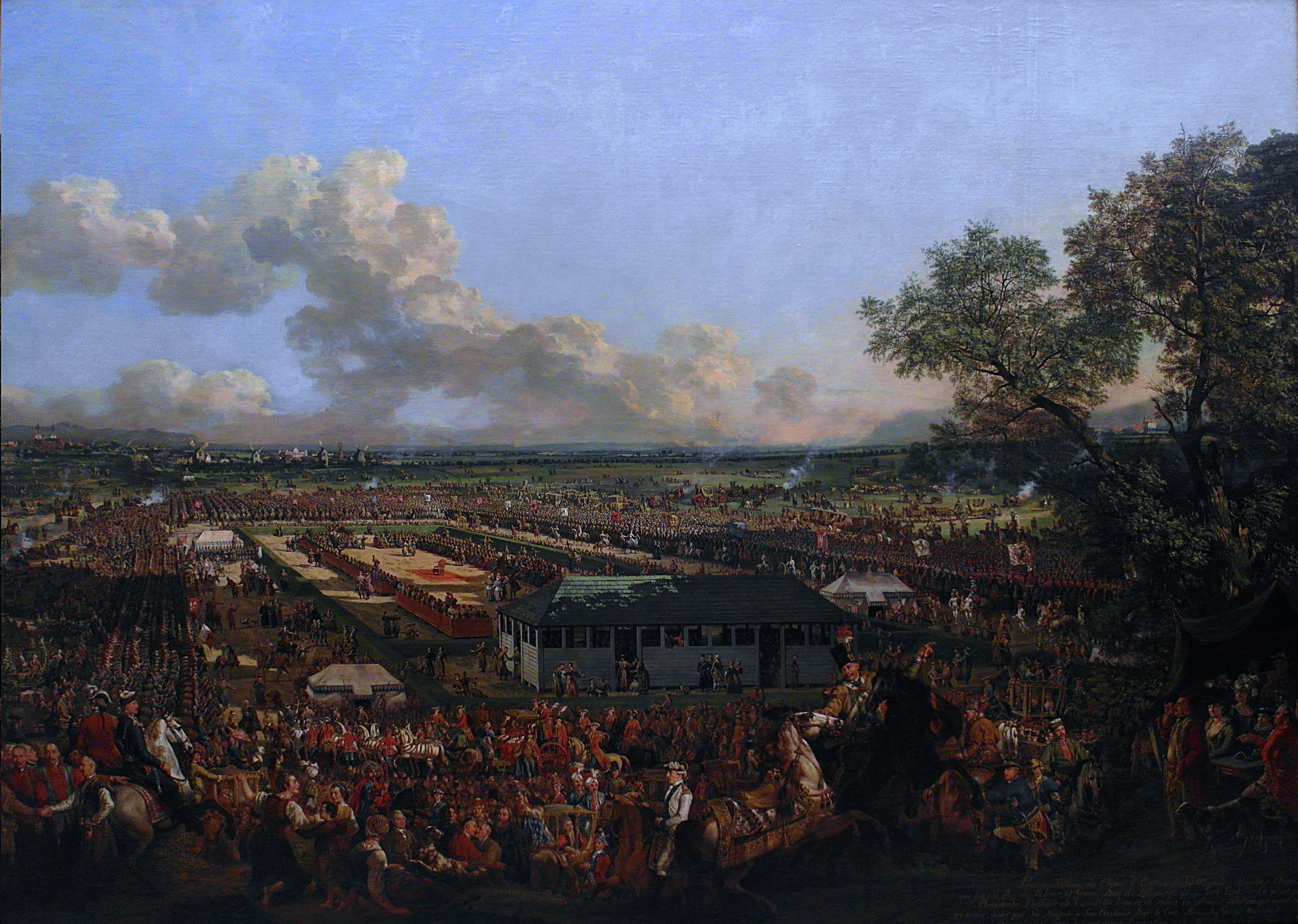
The first version of the work

The Election of Stanisław August is a 1778 oil-on-canvas painting by Bernardo Bellotto, produced to the instructions of its subject Stanisław August Poniatowski and now hanging alongside twenty-two other paintings by the artist in the Senatorial Hall of the Royal Castle, Warsaw, also known as the Canaletto Hall (Bellotto often went by the name of his uncle Canaletto). A first version produced in 1776 had not met with Stanisław August's approval and instead was given to Crown Marshal Franciszek Rzewuski; it is now in the National Museum, Poznań. Both works show the 1764 Polish–Lithuanian royal election, the last free royal election in the Polish–Lithuanian Commonwealth.

== Description ==
The painting shows the last free election in the history of the Polish-Lithuanian Commonwealth, carried out in September 1764 in the election field in Wola, visible in the painting from the north-west. The election field is divided into two parts – the closer one is occupied by a shed where senators sit, and the further one by the knight's circle with benches for the number of voivodship representatives. Around the election field, limited by trenches, there is the horse nobility gathering. In the background are the windmills in the village of Wola.

On the left side of the painting, on a hill, where nobles are shaking hands, there is also the clergy. The royal secretary, Kajetan Ghigiotti, wears the Order of Saint Stanislaus on his chest. Next to him, there is the carriage of Primate Władysław Aleksander Łubieński, completing the tour of individual provinces. The Primate, who wears the Order of the White Eagle, is surrounded by the aristocratic youth in the uniforms of the Royal Crown Guard. The lavishness of the retinue is noteworthy.

In the central part of the painting, the viewer can see the Płock Voivode Józef Antoni Podoski handing the voting protocol of his voivodeship to the Marshal of the Election Sejm, Józef Sylwester Sosnowski. Closer there is the royal horse holding a black steed belonging to Stanisław August by the reins. In the background, there are fluttering hats, tossed with joy by the nobles. In the right corner, the author of the painting, Bernardo Bellotto, appears sitting on a chair with a saber by his side.

King Stanisław August, who gave instructions to the artist, was anxious to emphasize the participation in the election procedure of the clergy and other important personalities. The presence of characters who are shaking hands and nobles greeting each others in the painting together with the clergy is meant to express the general agreement over the election. On the other hand, the scene of handing over the last voivodship votes to the marshal, because the primate was ill at the time and was replaced by the marshal of the election sejm, wants to emphasize the legality of the election. The seriousness of the noblemen, handing over the voting protocol, testifies the importance of the event and also is meant to represent the majesty of the Commonwealth.
