= The Grand Canal in Venice (Bellotto) =

Painting by Bernardo Bellotto

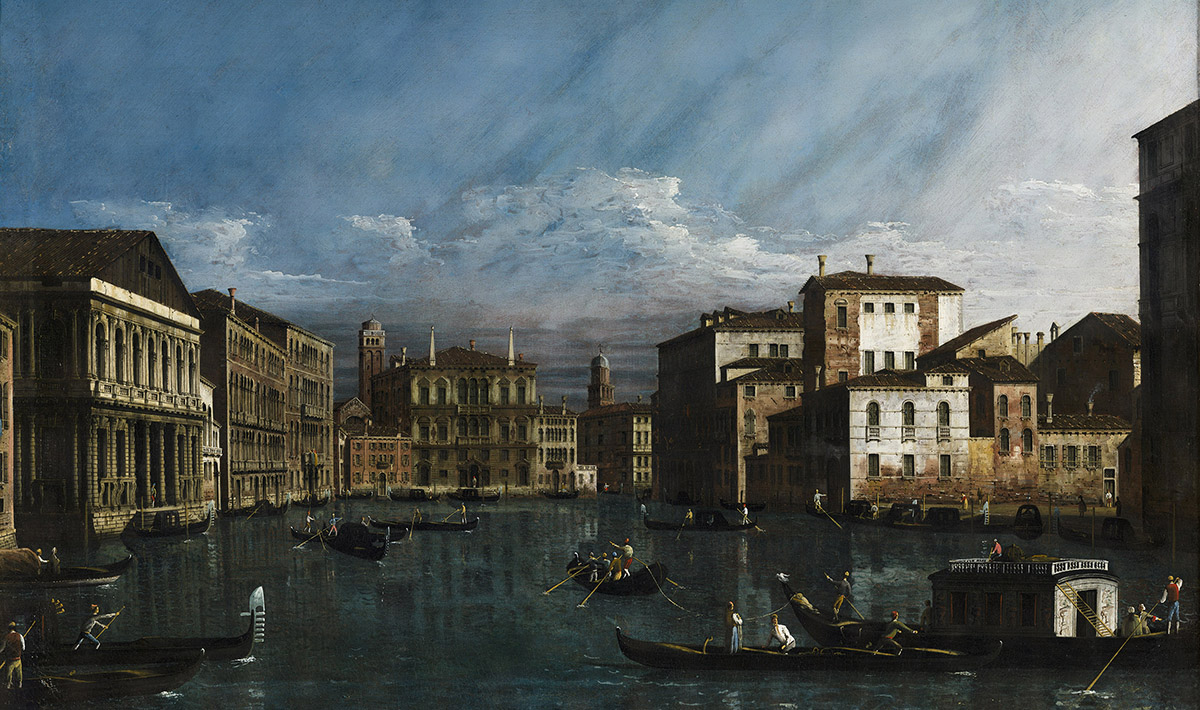
- Artist: Bernardo Bellotto
- Year: c. 1736–1740
- Medium: oil on canvas
- Dimensions: 79 cm × 121 cm (31 in × 48 in)
- Location: Musée des Beaux-Arts de Lyon; Lyon

The Grand Canal in Venice is an oil-on-canvas veduta painted c. 1736–1740 by the Italian artist Bernardo Bellotto. It is held in the Musée des Beaux-Arts de Lyon.

== Description ==
Several maneuvering gondolas are seen in the foreground, with buildings on either side of the Grand Canal at Campo San Samuele (some missing today on the right replaced by the Grassi Palace, and one under construction on the left the Ca 'Rezzonico).

Centered at the back, the Balbi Palace, recognizable by its two obelisks on the roof, and on both sides, on the left, the bell tower of the Basilica of Santa Maria Gloriosa dei Frari, on the right the bell tower of the Church of San Tomà. The sky is particularly neat with its shooting clouds.

== Provenance ==
The painting has been at the Musée des Beaux-Arts de Lyon, since it was bought in 1891.

== Sources ==
- Joconde (French)
