= View of Verona from the Ponte Nuovo =

Painting by Bernardo Bellotto

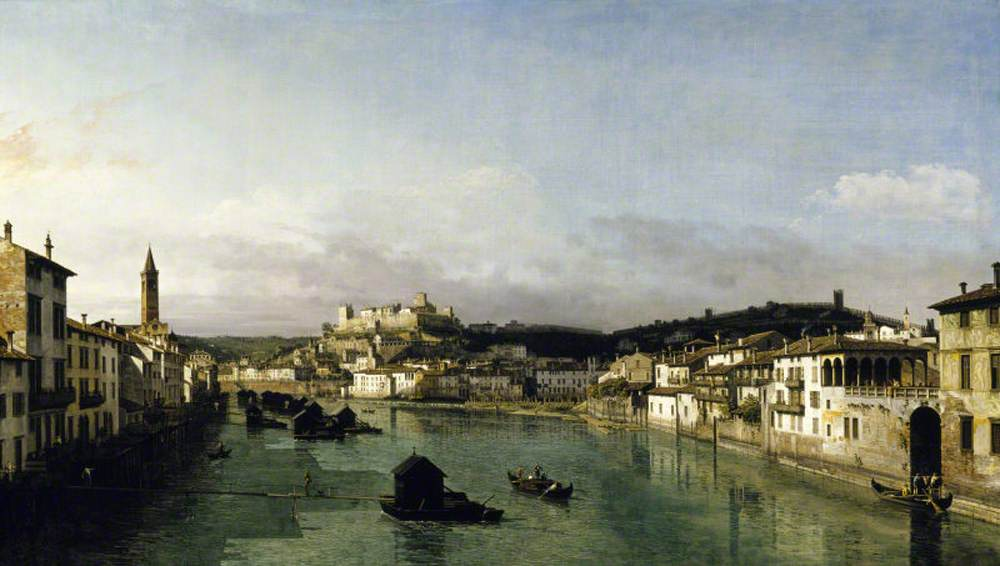
- Artist: Bernardo Bellotto
- Year: 1745-47
- Type: Oil on canvas, landscape painting
- Dimensions: 132.7 cm × 231.1 cm (52.2 in × 91.0 in)
- Location: Powis Castle, Wales

View of Verona from the Ponte Nuovo is a c. 1747 landscape painting by the Italian artist Bernardo Bellotto. It depicts the River Adige in Verona looking upstream from the Ponte Nuovo towards the Castel San Pietro fortress. It was one of a pair of paintings Belotto produced, its companion being the View of Verona with Ponte Delle Navi.

Belotto was the nephew of Canaletto and began his career painting similar views of Venice before increasingly branching out to paint a variety of other cities. This was produced towards the end of his Italian period before he relocated to Northern Europe. The picture was later acquired by the British soldier and colonial official Robert Clive at auction in London. In 1775 it was valued at 147 guineas and subsequently moved to Powis Castle in Montgomeryshire, the country estate of his son. It remains in the collection of Powis Castle, now administered by the National Trust.

== Bibliography ==
- Bowron, Edgar. Bernardo Bellotto and the Capitals of Europe. Yale University Press, 2001.
- Treves, Letizia. Bellotto: The Königstein Views Reunited. National Gallery, 2021.
