= Capriccio with the Campidoglio =

Painting by Bernardo Bellotto

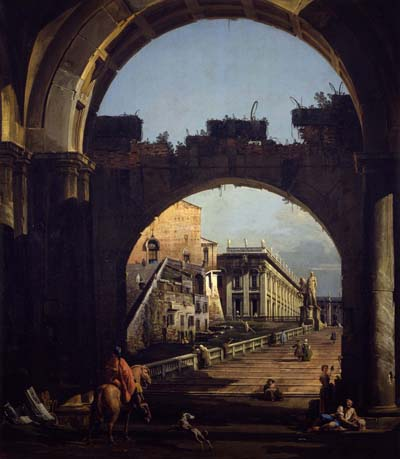
- Artist: Bernardo Bellotto
- Year: c. 1742
- Medium: oil on canvas
- Dimensions: 116 cm × 131 cm (46 in × 52 in)
- Location: Galleria nazionale di Parma, Parma

Capriccio with the Campidoglio is a c. 1742 oil-on-canvas painting by the Italian artist Bernardo Bellotto. It was acquired by count Stefano Sanvitale di Parma in 1835 and then exhibited in the Galleria nazionale di Parma, where it now hangs alongside another painting originally produced as its pendant.

The work is an architectural capriccio, with fictive architecture in the foreground and elements of real architecture from Rome such as the 'cordonata capitolina', the colossal statue of Castor, the Basilica di Santa Maria in Aracoeli, the Palazzo Nuovo and part of the Palazzo Senatorio.

== Description ==
The work is a capriccio, which mixes what really exists (here, the Capitol of Rome, its staircase and the church of Aracoeli), with fantastic places (the ruins in the foreground). In this way, the artist constructs a city that is not real, but possible and imaginary.

The ruins in the foreground serve as the proscenium, offering a view of the Capitol from the bottom of the cordonata capitolina, the staircase designed by Michelangelo, and also including the Church of Santa Maria in Aracoeli. At the top of the stairs the marble group of Castor can be seen, and, further on, the new Palace and the partial view of the senatorial palace.

By depicting these buildings, so loved by foreigners undertaking the Grand Tour in Italy, more than reproducing reality, Bellotto seeks to represent an almost melancholy feeling, to remind the observer of past ancient grandeur. The canvas belongs to the beginning of the artist's production, constituting a testimony to his Roman period.
