= The Fortress of Königstein from the North =

Painting by Bernardo Bellotto

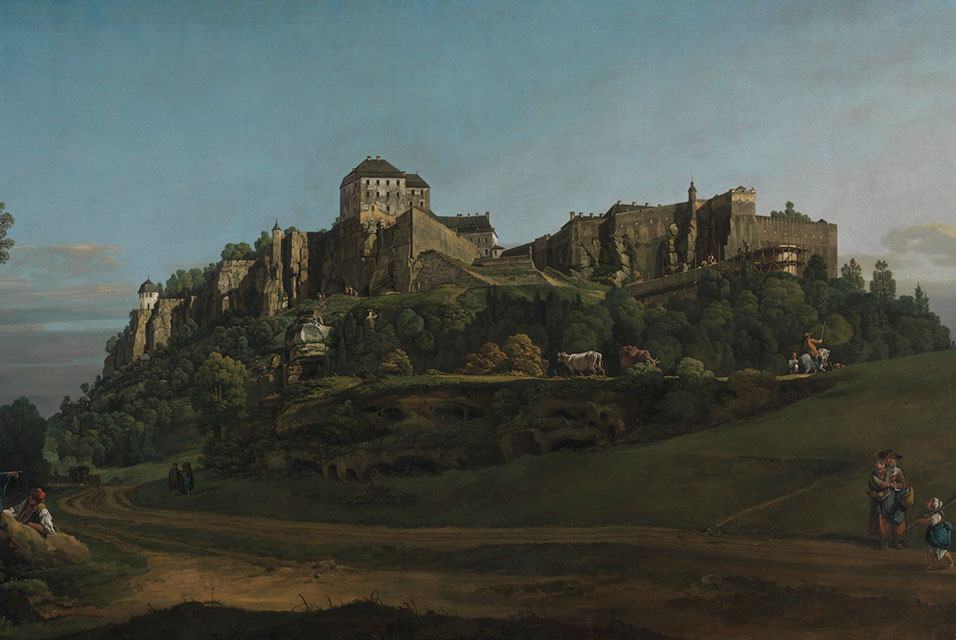
- Artist: Bernardo Bellotto
- Year: 1756-58
- Type: Oil on canvas, landscape painting
- Dimensions: 132.1 cm × 236.2 cm (52.0 in × 93.0 in)
- Location: National Gallery, London

The Fortress of Königstein from the North is a c.1758 landscape painting by the Italian artist Bernardo Bellotto. It depicts the Fortress of Königstein in Saxony. It features a view looking up towards the fortress from a lane that winds through the valley of the River Elbe. It emphasis the rural life that exists beyond the stronghold's walls.

Bellotto was the nephew and pupil of Canaletto. Although he began his career painting scenes of Venice, he later moved to Northern Europe and became know for his views of Dresden and Warsaw in particular. It was commissioned by the Elector of Saxony Augustus III. This was part of a series of five paintings he produced featuring Königstein, two of which (Courtyard with the Brunnenhaus and Courtyard with the Magdalenenburg) are in Manchester Art Gallery.

Today the painting. Is in the collection for the National Gallery in London. It was purchased in 2017 via a large fundraising campaign.

== Bibliography ==
- Treves, Letizia. Bellotto: The Königstein Views Reunited. National Gallery, 2021.
