= The Grand Canal Facing Santa Croce =

Painting attributed to Bernardo Bellotto

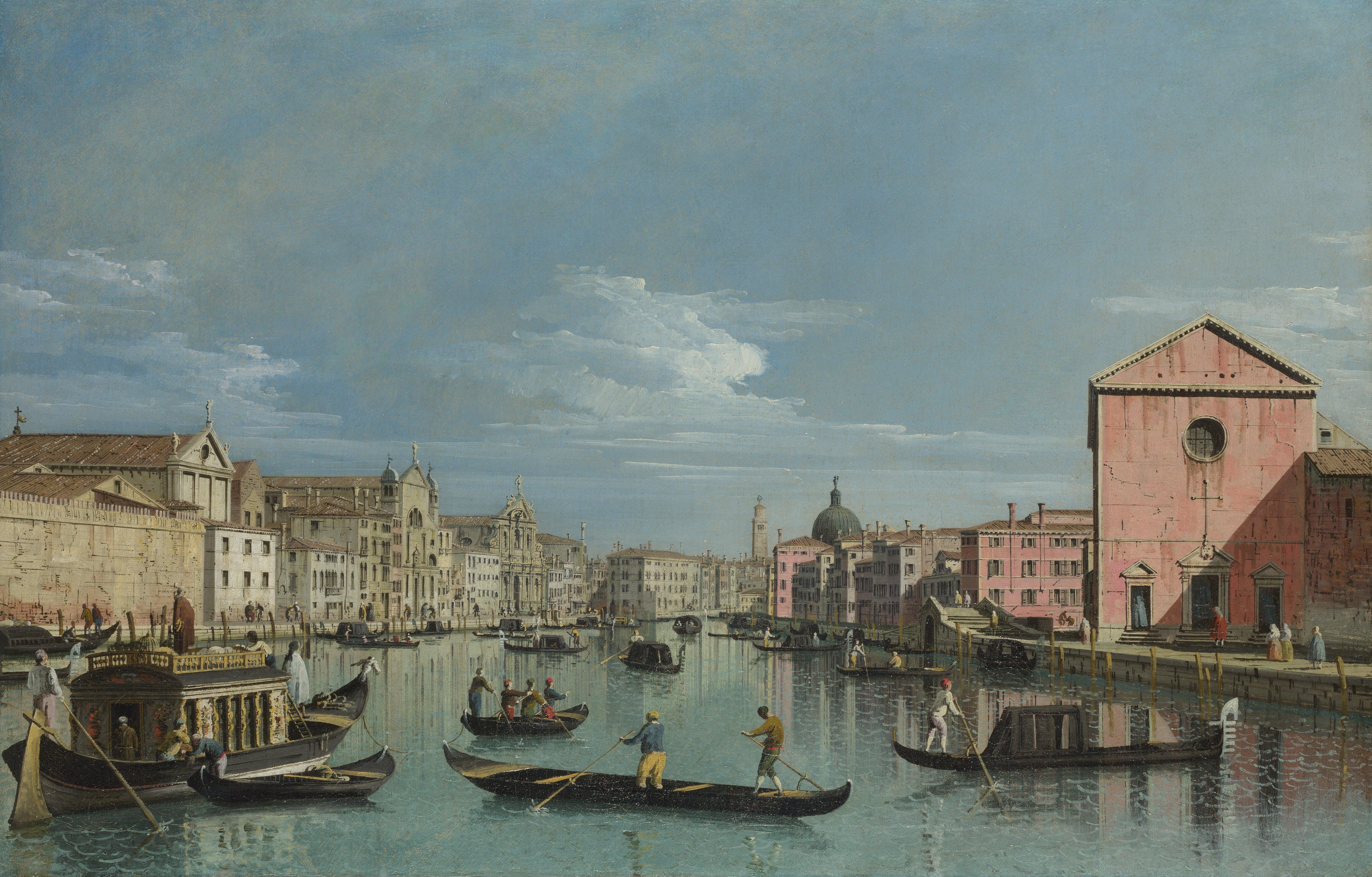
- Artist: Bernardo Bellotto (attribution)
- Year: c. 1738
- Medium: oil on canvas
- Dimensions: 59.7 cm × 92.1 cm (23.5 in × 36.3 in)
- Location: National Gallery, London

The Grand Canal Facing Santa Croce is an oil-on-canvas painting attributed to the Italian painter Bernardo Bellotto, now in the National Gallery in London.

== History and description ==
The view depicts the Grand Canal with several boats, including the Burchiello, which operated between Venice and Padua. In the foreground on the right is the church of Santa Croce, for which the painting his named, and further away, it appears the green dome of San Simeon Piccolo. To the left, however, behind high walls, emerge the tops of the façades of the church of Corpus Domini and the Scuola dei Nobili, followed by the façades of the churches of Santa Lucia and degli Scalzi, before the canal curves and closes the view beneath the bell tower of San Geremia.

It was produced after Canaletto's death by an artist from his studio, most likely his nephew and pupil Bernardo Bellotto. It probably dates to c. 1738, when Bellotto was only 16 years old, and it is believed to have been based on a drawing by Canaletto (Windsor Castle, Royal Collection), from the same decade. A similar view (also in the Royal Collection) was copied in an engraving by Antonio Visentini, whilst the right-hand part of the painting also appears in Santa Croce on the Grand Canal (National Gallery), attributed to an unknown member of Canaletto's studio.

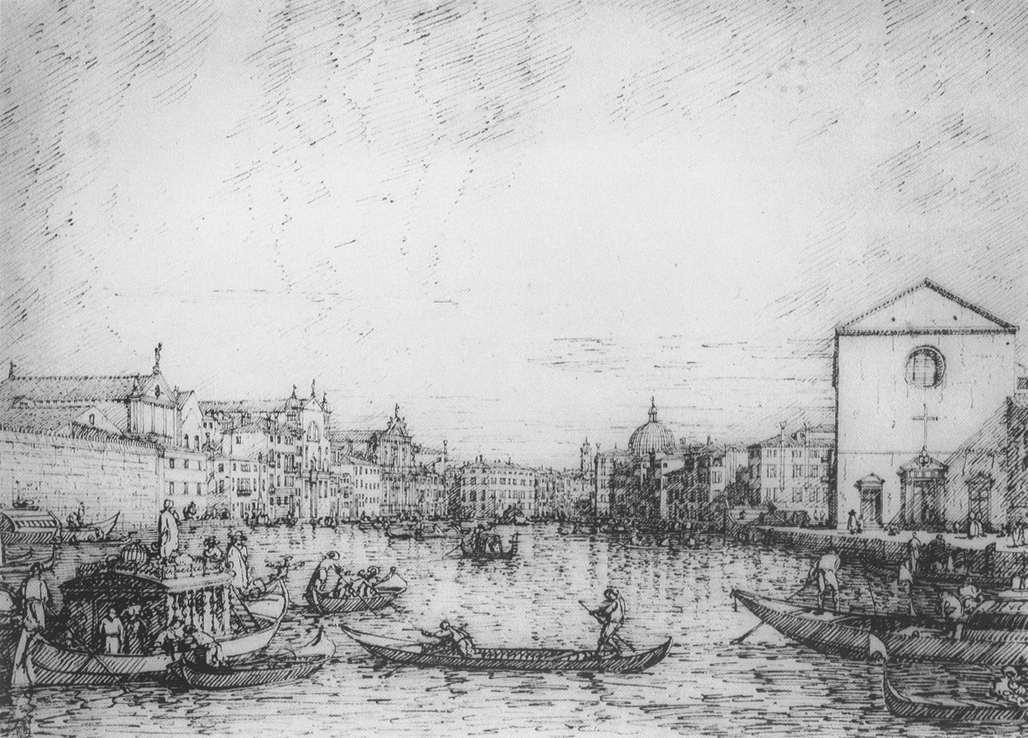
Canaletto, The Grand Canal - Looking North-East from Santa Croce to San Geremia, c. 1730–40, Windsor, Royal Collection

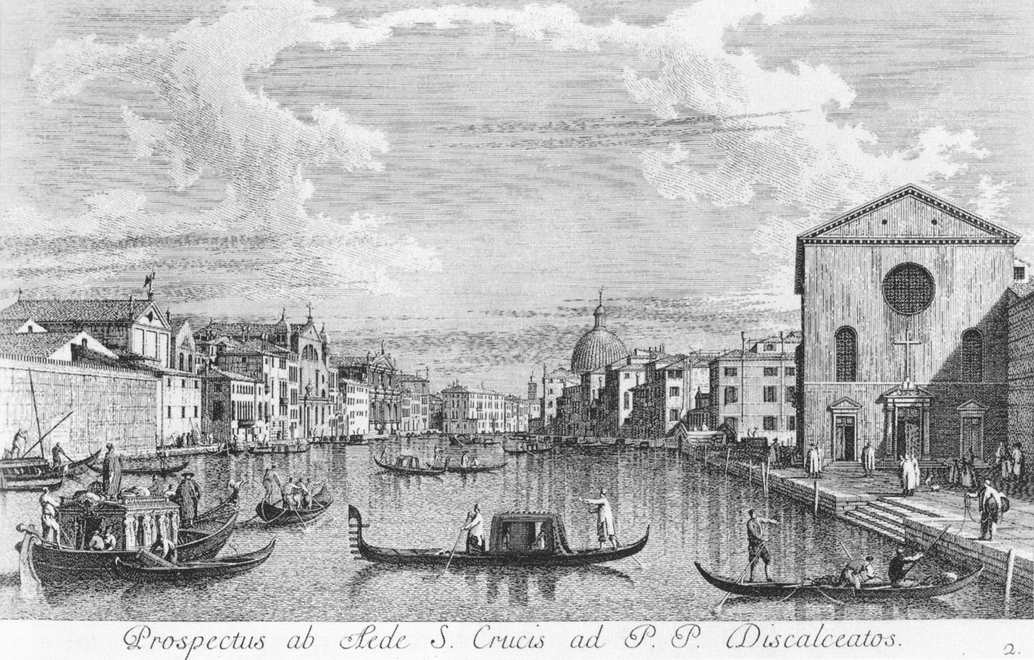
Antonio Visentini, The Canal Grande from Santa Croce to the East, 1742, Windsor, Royal Collection

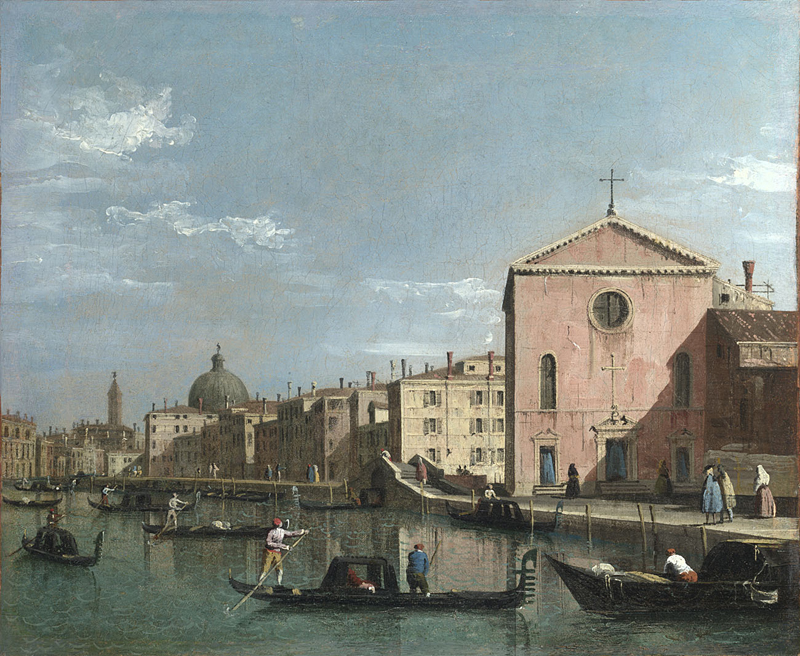
Follower of Canaletto, The Grand Canal facing Santa Croce, post-1738, London, National Gallery
