= The Imperial Pleasure Palace Schönbrunn, Courtyard Side =

18th century painting by Bernardo Bellotto

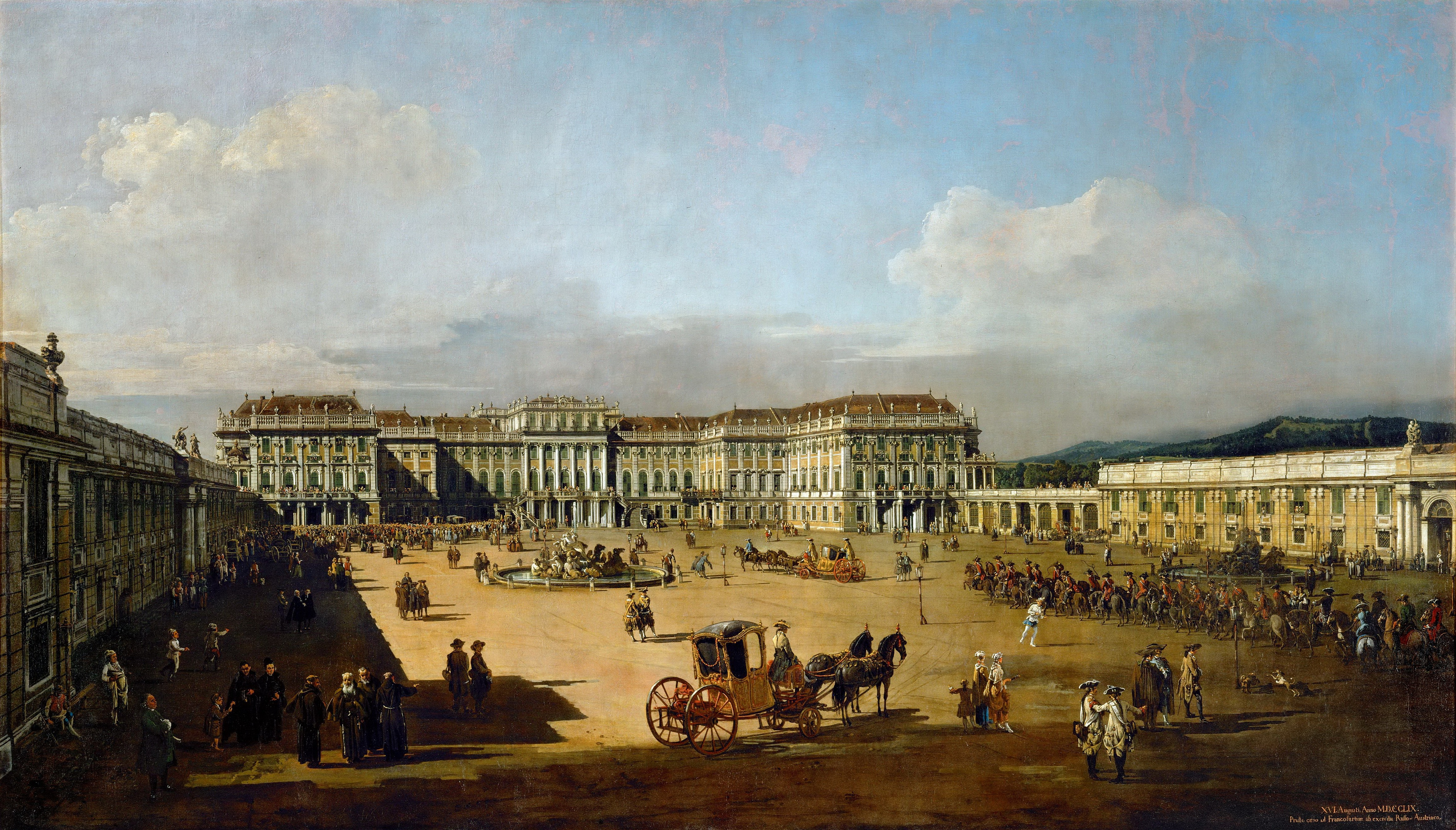
- Artist: Bernardo Bellotto
- Year: 1759–1760
- Medium: Oil on canvas
- Movement: Veduta
- Dimensions: 135 cm × 235 cm (53 in × 93 in)
- Location: Kunsthistorisches Museum, Vienna
- Website: khm.at

The Imperial Pleasure Palace Schönbrunn, Courtyard Side (German: Das kaiserliche Lustschloß Schönbrunn, Ehrenhofseite), is a painting created in 1759–1760 by the Italian painter Bernardo Bellotto. It depicts the palace of Schönbrunn in Vienna, after a renovation in 1744–1749 by Nicolò Pacassi. It measures 135 cm × 235 cm in size and is located at the Kunsthistorisches Museum in Vienna. The work captures the historic moment on August 16, 1759, when empress Maria Theresa received the message that the Austrian army had won in battle against the Prussians at Kunersdorf.
