= View of Venice: The Piazzetta Seen from the Riva degli Schiavoni =

Painting by Jean-Baptiste-Camille Corot

View of Venice: The Piazetta Seen from the Riva degli Schiavoni
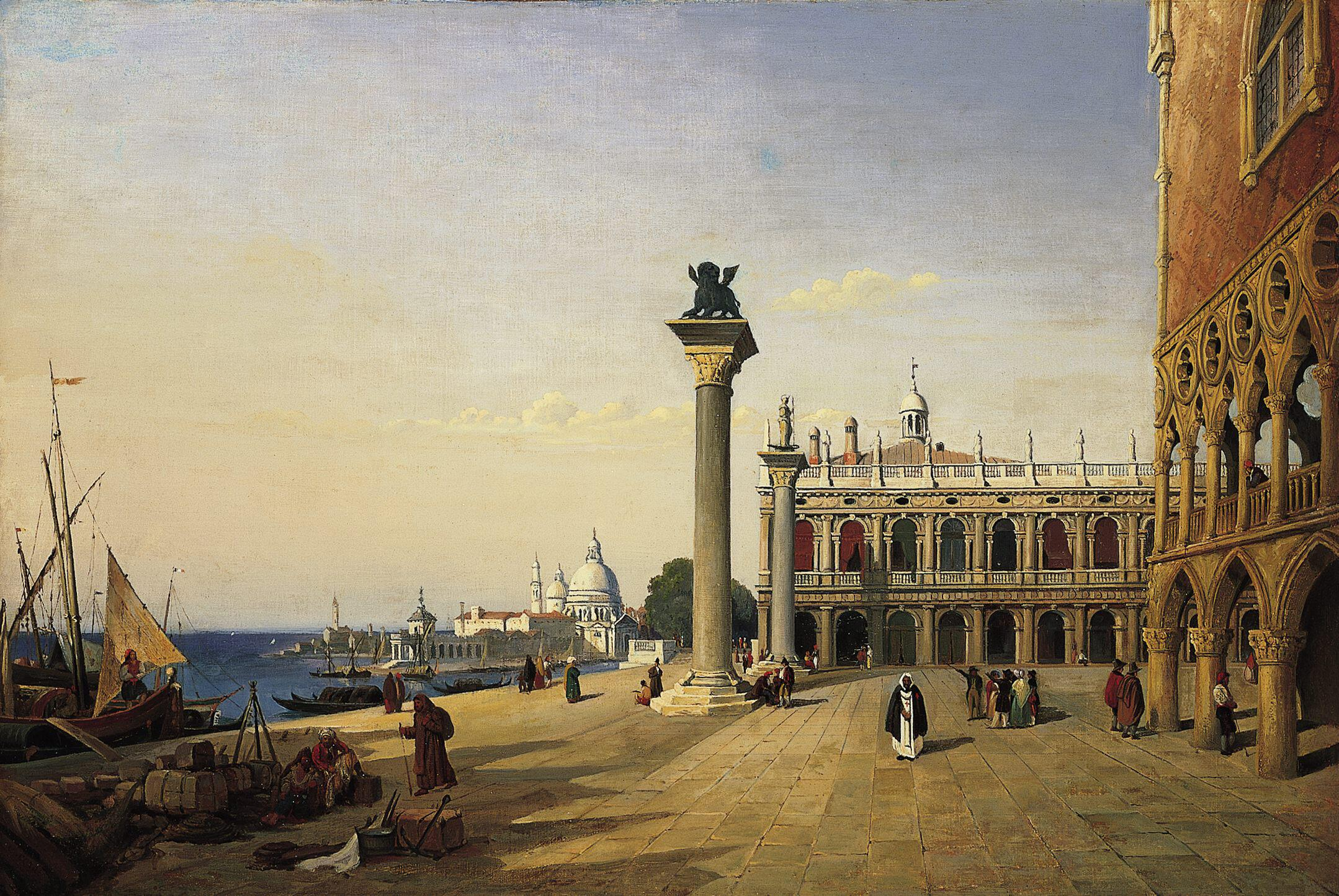
- Artist: Jean-Baptiste-Camille Corot
- Year: c. 1835–1845
- Medium: oil on canvas
- Dimensions: 46.7 cm × 68.6 cm (18.4 in × 27.0 in)
- Location: Norton Simon Museum, Pasadena

View of Venice: The Piazzetta Seen from the Riva degli Schiavoni is an oil-on-canvas painting of Venice executed c. 1835–1845 by French artist Jean-Baptiste-Camille Corot. The painting is at the Norton Simon Museum in Pasadena, but as at 2026 not on display.

The painting depicts the Piazzetta (an extension of the Piazza San Marco) from the Riva degli Schiavoni waterfront. In the centre is a column carrying the Lion of Venice, a sculpture of a winged lion.
