= Portrait of the Comte de Vaudreuil =

Portrait of the Comte de Vaudreuil may refer to:

- Portrait of the Comte de Vaudreuil (Drouais), a 1758 painting by François-Hubert Drouais
- Portrait of the Comte de Vaudreuil (Vigée Le Brun), a 1784 painting by Élisabeth Vigée Le Brun
