= Pumphouse =

Pumphouse may refer to:

== Pumping station ==
- Pumping station
  - Cobblestone Railroad Pumphouse Ontario County, New York
  - Polsterberg Pumphouse Upper Harz in central Germany
  - New Pump-House, the Byrd Park Pump House, Richmond Virginia

== Theatres and arts venues ==
- The Pumphouse Aldeburgh Music
- The Pumphouse, List of historic places in Calgary venue of Loose Moose Theatre
- The PumpHouse Theatre, Takapuna Lake Pupuke
- Pumphouse Educational Museum Lavender Pond park Rotherhithe, London

== Geography ==
- Pumphouse Point Tasmania Lake St Clair (Tasmania)
- Pumphouse Lake Three Lakes Valley on Signy Island
- The Pumphouse white water course of Ottawa River Runners

== Art and entertainment ==
- South of the Pumphouse, 2006 novella by rock musician Les Claypool
- Pumphouse (album), 1998 Tokyo Blade album
