= The Toy Seller =

Painting by William Mulready

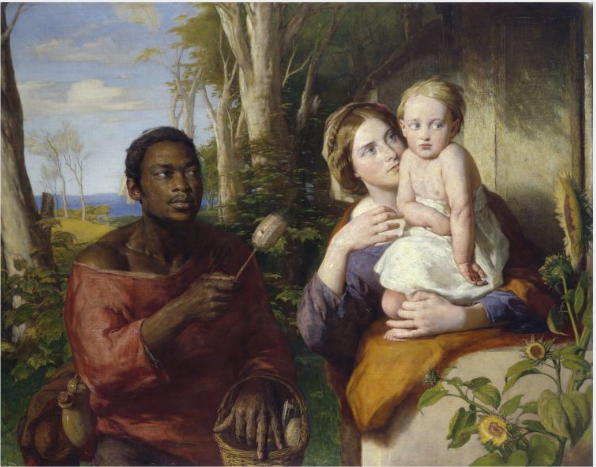
- Version in the National Gallery of Ireland
- Artist: William Mulready
- Year: 1835
- Type: Oil on panel, genre painting
- Dimensions: 36 cm × 31 cm (14 in × 12 in)
- Location: Victoria and Albert Museum, London

The Toy Seller is an oil painting by the Irish artist William Mulready, from 1835. The original is held at the Victoria and Albert Museum, in London

It depicts a travelling toy salesman, trying to persuade a mother to buy from him, despite the child's obvious reluctance. The original painting shows him holding a toy bird, while the later version appears to show a rattle. It shows a scene in rural England, with the salesman as a black man.

The painting was displayed at the Royal Academy Exhibition of 1836 at Somerset House in London. It was donated to the Victoria and Albert Museum in 1857 as part of the Sheepshanks Gift.

Later in his carer Mulready worked on a much larger version of the painting on canvas. This was acquired by the National Gallery of Ireland in 1891.

== Bibliography ==
- Langford, Martha (£_?,) Narratives Unfolding: National Art Histories in an Unfinished World. McGill-Queen's University Press, 2017.
- Roe, Sonia. Oil Paintings in Public Ownership in the Victoria and Albert Museum. Public Catalogue Foundation, 2008.
- Wright, Christopher, Gordon, Catherine May & Smith, Mary Peskett. British and Irish Paintings in Public Collections: An Index of British and Irish Oil Paintings by Artists Born Before 1870 in Public and Institutional Collections in the United Kingdom and Ireland. Yale University Press, 2006.
