= The Fortress of Königstein Courtyard with the Brunnenhaus =

Painting by Bernardo Bellotto

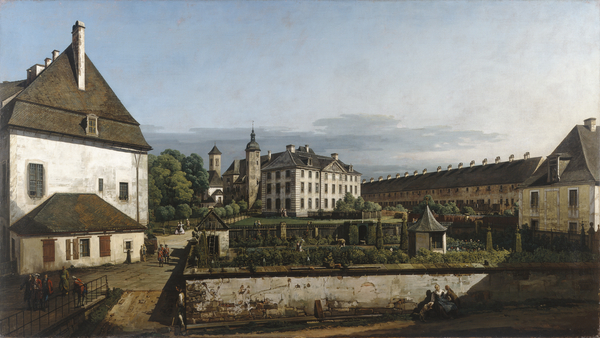
- Artist: Bernardo Bellotto
- Year: 1756-58
- Type: Oil on canvas, landscape painting
- Dimensions: 133.9 cm × 238 cm (52.7 in × 94 in)
- Location: Manchester Art Gallery, Greater Manchester

The Fortress of Königstein Courtyard with the Brunnenhaus is c.1758 landscape painting by the Italian artist Bernardo Bellotto. It shows the courtyard inside the Fortress of Königstein not far from Dresden. Looking northeastwards it features a view of the Brunnenhaus, a pumphouse connected to a deep well which kept the garrison supplies with fresh water. Also visible are the Commandment's House, the Central Barracks and St George's Church.

It was one of a series of five paintings commissioned by the Elector of Saxony Augustus III.The painting was subsequently acquired by the Northern English landowner John Tempest and hung at his country house Wynyard Hall in County Durham. It was inherited by his niece Lady Londonderry and passed through her descendants. It was sold in 1982 and acquired by the Manchester Art Gallery.

== Bibliography ==
- Howard, Michael . Up Close: A Guide to Manchester Art Gallery. Scala, 2002.
- Treves, Letizia. Bellotto: The Königstein Views Reunited. National Gallery, 2021.
