= Stefano Bruzzi =

Italian painter

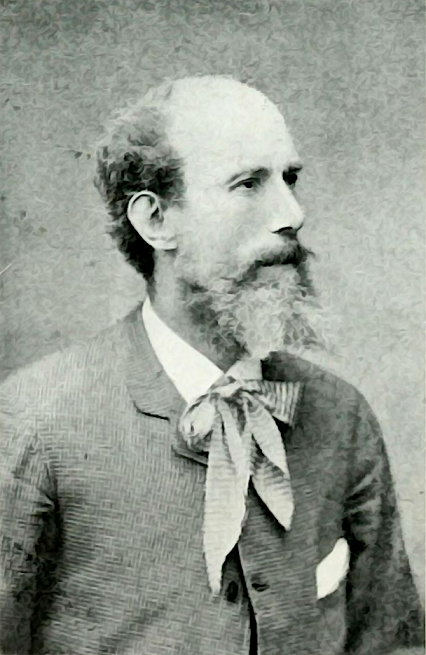
- Born: 1 May 1835; Piacenza, Italy
- Died: 4 January 1911 (aged 75); Piacenza, Italy
- Known for: Painting

Stefano Bruzzi (1 May 1835 – 1911) was an Italian painter, mainly of landscapes, with children and animals, in a style that recalls Filippo Palizzi.

== Life ==
Born in Emilia, he initially studied in Piacenza under professor Bernardino Massari. At the age of 19 years, he was sent by his father to study in Rome for four years, becoming a follower of professor Castelli. For the marchese Filippo Anguissola of Piacenza he painted: Returning from a hunt near Porto d'Anzio. He lived for some years in Piacenza, painting in the surrounding countryside; from there he moved to Bologna, and finally settled in Florence.

At the first national exposition of Parma he was awarded a silver medal. Among his other works are: Il Passo difficile; Il Viatico; La Carbonaia; Una predica sugli Appennini; La Fiera; L'Autunno; La Benedizione alle Bestie; and Il Precipizio e parecchie vedute dell' Appennino.
