= Bernardo Bellotto =

Italian painter and printmaker (c. 1721–1780)

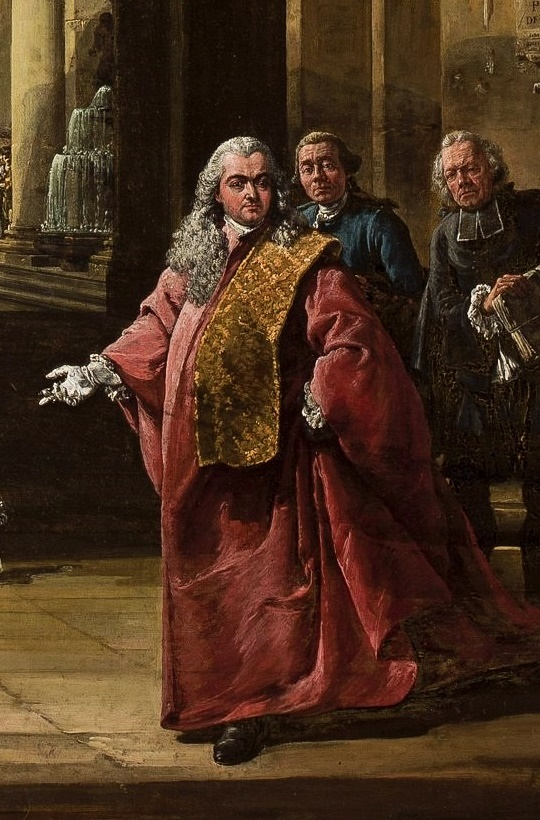
- Detail of Self-portrait as Venetian ambassador (c. 1765)
- Born: 30 January 1721; Venice, Republic of Venice
- Died: 17 November 1780 (aged 59); Warsaw, Polish–Lithuanian Commonwealth
- Resting place: Capuchin Church, Warsaw, Poland
- Known for: Landscape painting
- Patrons: Stanislaus II Augustus

Bernardo Bellotto (c. 1721/1722 or 30 January 1721 – 17 November 1780), was an Italian urban landscape painter or vedutista, and printmaker in etching, famous for his vedute of European cities – Dresden, Vienna, Turin, and Warsaw.

He was the student and nephew of the renowned Giovanni Antonio Canal, known as Canaletto, and sometimes used the latter's illustrious name, signing himself "Bernardo Canaletto". In Germany and Poland, Bellotto called himself by his uncle's name, Canaletto.

This caused some confusion; Bellotto's work, though, is more somber in color than Canaletto's, and his depiction of clouds and shadows brings him closer to Dutch painting.

Bellotto's style was characterized by elaborate representation of architectural and natural vistas, and by the specific quality of each place's lighting. It is plausible that Bellotto, and other Venetian masters of vedute, may have used the camera obscura to achieve superior precision of urban views.

== Life ==
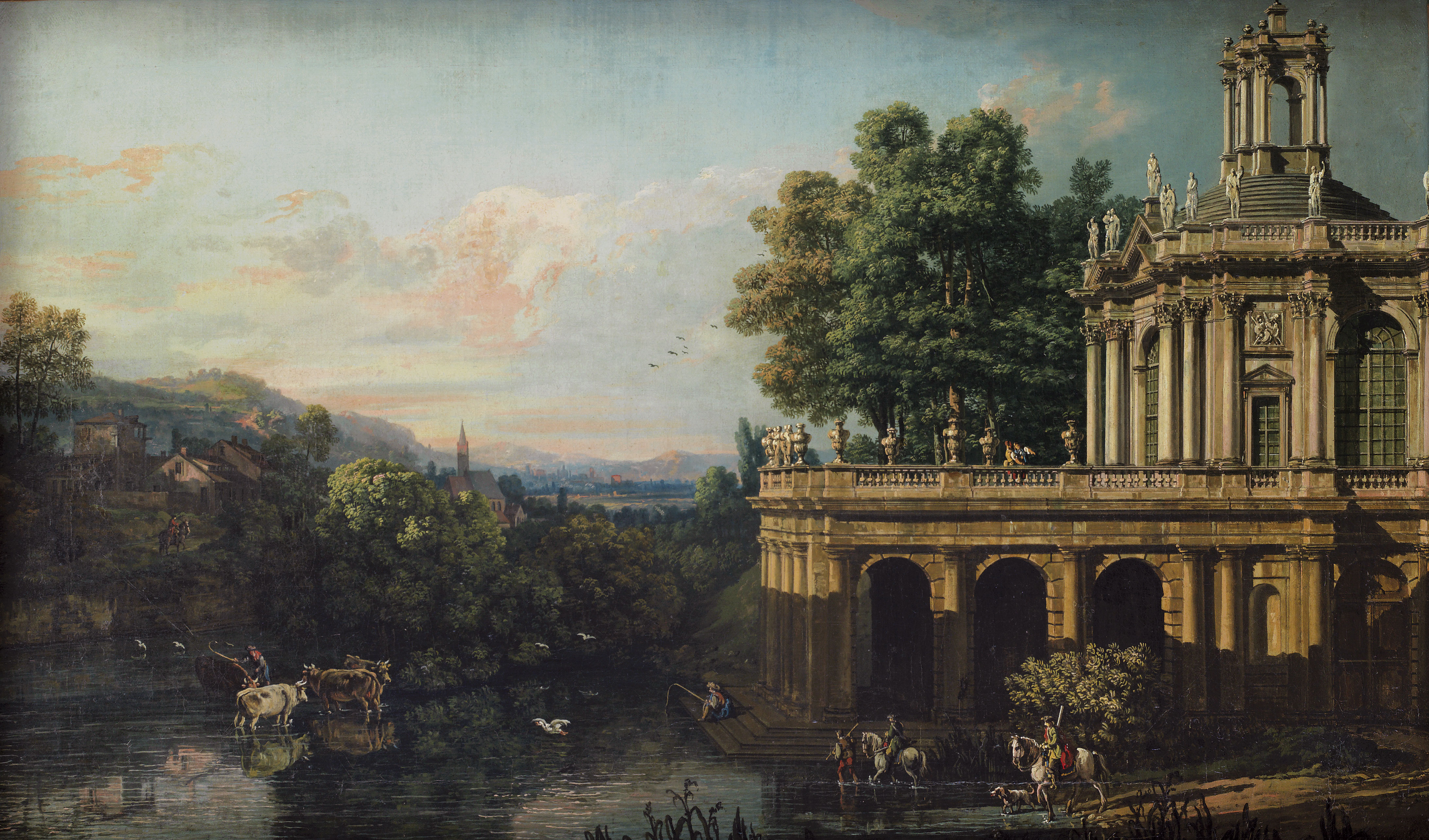
Architectural Capriccio with a palace, Museo de Bellas Artes de Bilbao

Bellotto was born in Venice, the son of Lorenzo Antonio Bellotto and Fiorenza Canal, sister of the famous Canaletto, and studied in his uncle's workshop.

In 1742 he moved to Rome, where he produced vedute of that city. In 1744 and 1745 he traveled northern Italy, again depicting vedute of each city. Among others, he worked for Charles Emmanuel III of Savoy.

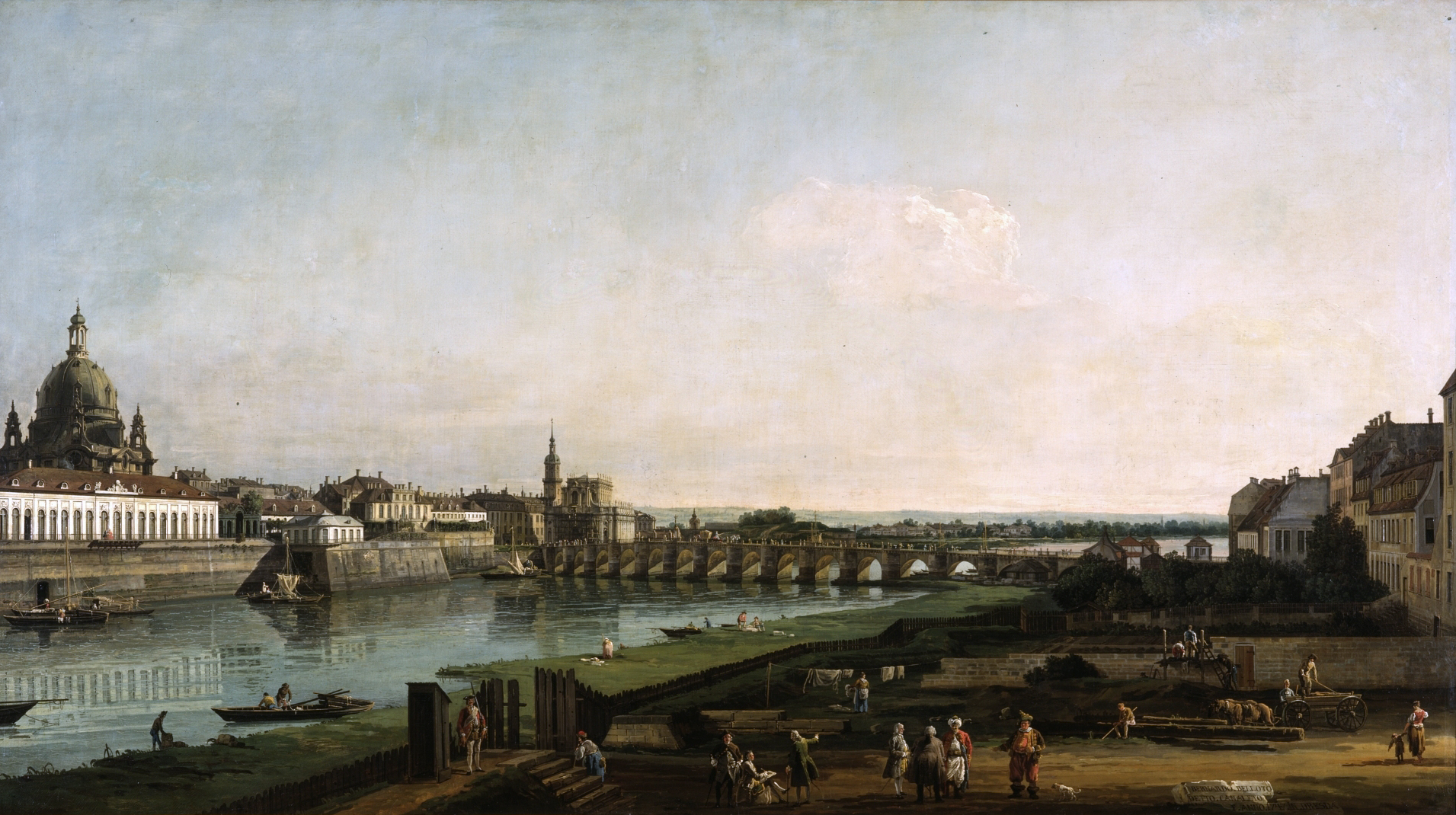
Dresden From the Right Bank of the Elbe Above the Augustus Bridge, Gemäldegalerie Alte Meister

From 1747 to 1758 he moved to Dresden, following an invitation from King Augustus III of Poland. He created paintings of the cities Dresden and Pirna and their surroundings. Today these paintings preserve a memory of Dresden's former beauty, which was destroyed by bombing during World War II.

His international reputation grew, and in 1758 he accepted an invitation from Empress Maria Theresa to come to Vienna, where he painted views of the city's monuments.

In 1761 Bellotto left Vienna for Munich, where he spent almost a year. In a letter to her cousin Duchess Maria Antonia of Bavaria, Empress Maria Theresia had praised Bellotto's artistic achievements at the Viennese court. Logically, he was commissioned works by the ruling family of Bavaria. He painted a panoramic view of Munich and two vedute of Nymphenburg Palace for Maximilian III Joseph, Elector of Bavaria. At the end of 1761, Bellotto returned to Dresden.

When King Augustus III of Poland, also Elector of Saxony, who usually lived in Dresden, died in 1763, Bellotto's work became less important in Dresden. As a consequence, he left Dresden to seek employment in Saint Petersburg at the court of Catherine the Great. On his way to Saint Petersburg, however, Bellotto accepted an invitation in 1764 from Poland's newly elected King Stanisław August Poniatowski to become his court painter in Warsaw from 1768.

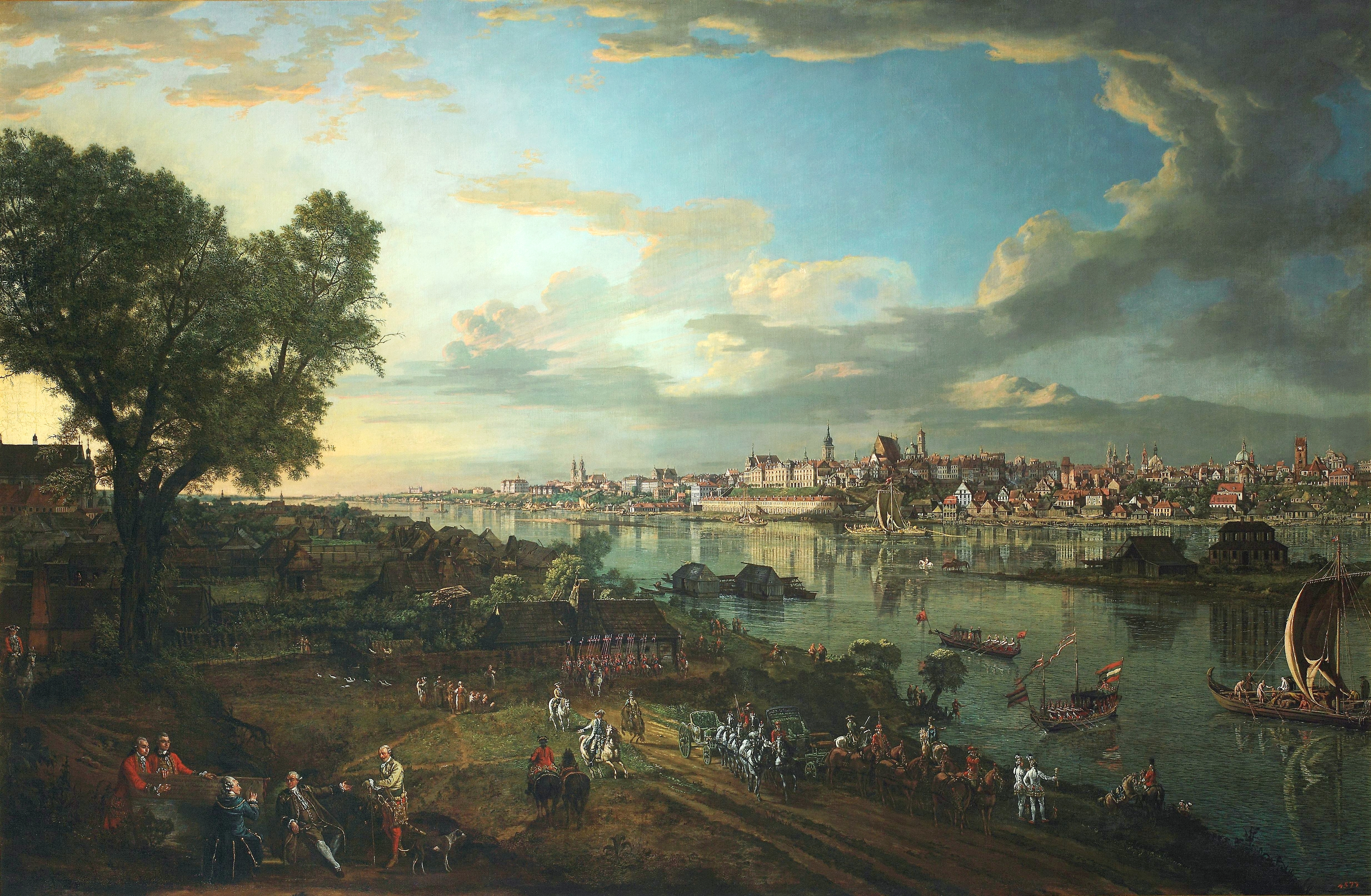
View of Warsaw from Praga, Royal Castle, Warsaw

Here he remained some 16 years, for the rest of his life, as court painter to the King, for whom he painted numerous views of the Polish capital and its environs for the Royal Castle in Warsaw, complement of the great historical paintings commissioned by Poniatowski from Marcello Bacciarelli. His initial commissions included painted decoration of the Ujazdów Castle between 1767 and 1770, of which a study of illusionistic vault is the only preserved example of profuse decoration lost in 1784 during the reconstruction of the castle into military barracks.

In 1769 the painter and his son Lorenzo (1744–1770) accomplished another large royal commission – fourteen views of Rome, ancient and papal, based on the collection of etchings by Giovanni Battista Piranesi entitled Vedute di Roma. The collection was dispersed in the early nineteenth century and today various paintings can be admired in different museums in Russia – The Roman Forum as seen from the Capitol to the south-east and Piazza della Rotonda with Pantheon (Pushkin Museum, Moscow), View of the Piazza Navona (Nizhny Novgorod State Art Museum), View of S. Maria Maggiore (Far Eastern Art Museum, Khabarovsk) and in private collections.

His paintings of Warsaw, 26 vedute painted between 1770 and 1780 to embellish the so-called Panorama Room (later Canaletto Room) at the Royal Castle in Warsaw and later relocated to Russia, were restored to the Polish Government in 1921 and were used in rebuilding the city after its near-complete destruction by German troops during World War II.

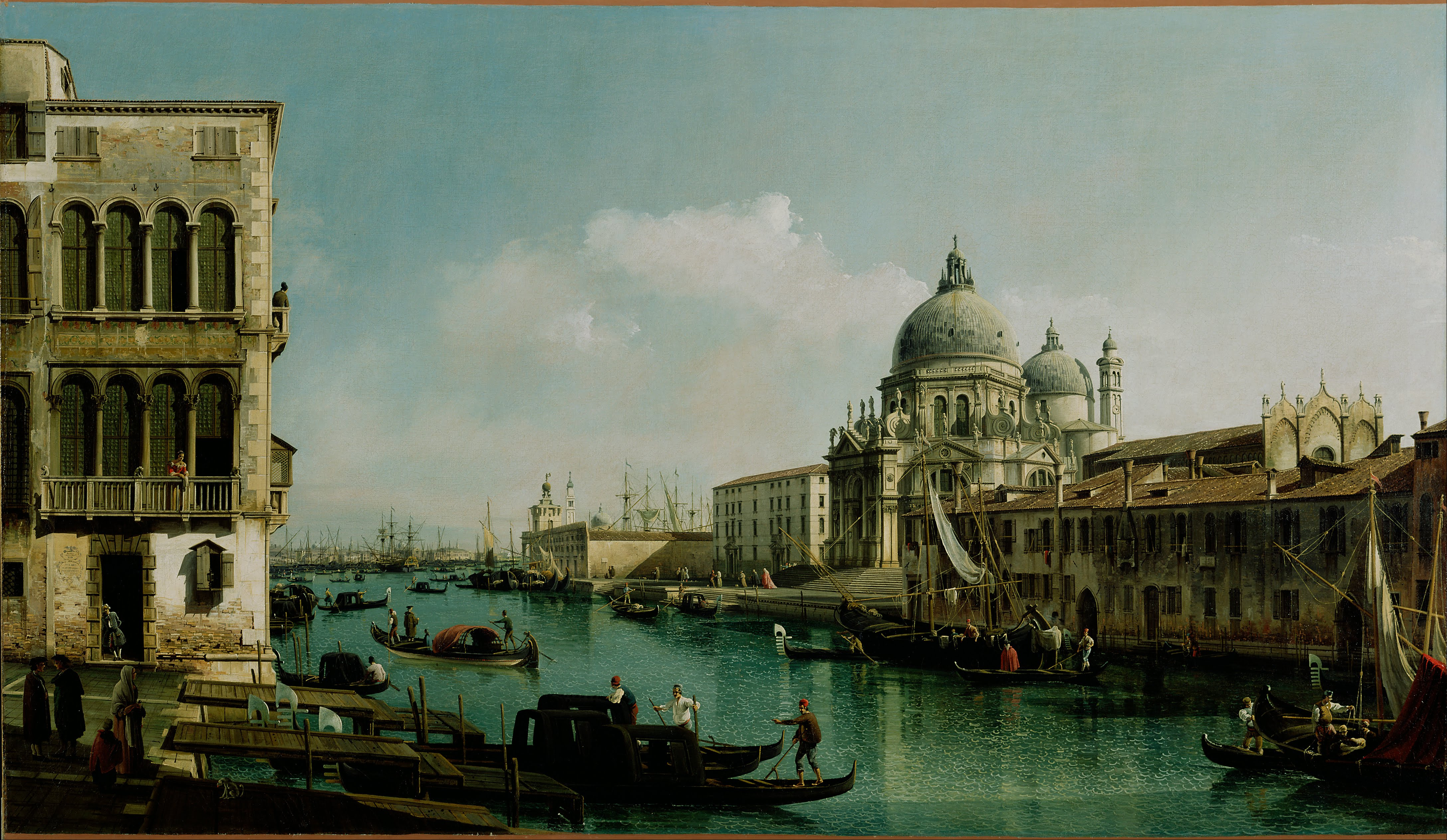
View of the Grand Canal with the Santa Maria della Salute and the Dogana. J. Paul Getty Museum.

Bellotto's early work bears strong features of his uncle's style, becoming more individual and distinguished in later years with clear inspiration of Dutch landscape painting with massed clouds, cast shadows and rich foliage. His colouring is colder and characterized by a steely grey.

The last period of the artist's work is assessed as distinct from the earlier stages with emphasis on the immediacy of observation, striving for a generic treatment of staffage, ability to capture the atmosphere of the place and visible transformation of his painting which become more colorful with warmer tones. For the first time he also undertook historical subjects including The Election of Stanisław August (1778) for the King and Entry of Jerzy Ossoliński into Rome in 1633 (1779) commissioned by Józef Maksymilian Ossoliński. Bellotto created a school of painting which was later continued and developed by Zygmunt Vogel and Marcin Zaleski.

Bernardo Bellotto died in Warsaw in 1780 and was buried in Capuchin Church at Miodowa Street.

His younger brother was named Pietro Bellotto (1725 – c. 1805) and after collaborating with Canaletto and his brother, moved to France, where he was known as le Sieur Canalety and Pietro Bellotti di Caneletty. The brother was also referred to as Belloti, Belloty, Beloty, or Bellottit.

== Works by subject ==
=== Italy ===
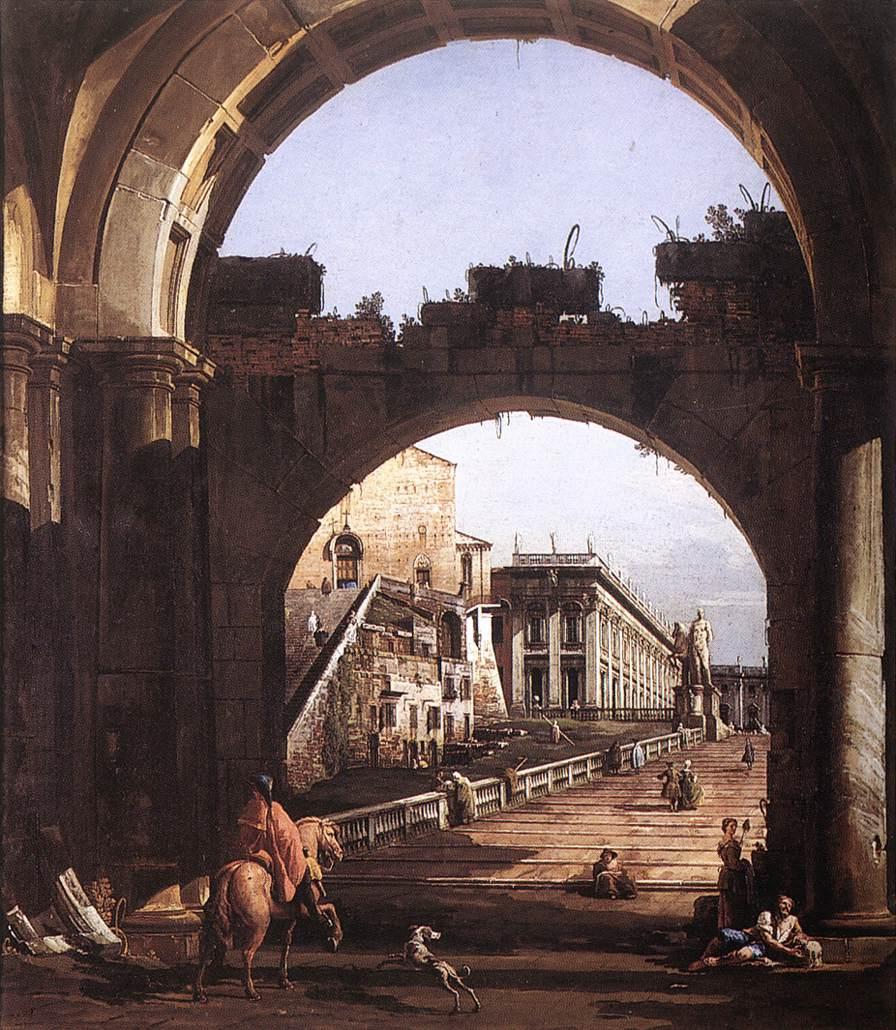
'Capriccio of the Capitol'. "Bellotto's urban scenes have the same carefully drawn realism as his uncle's Venetian views but are marked by heavy shadows and are darker and colder in tone and colour."

==== Venice and Veneto ====
- The Grand Canal facing Santa Croce (c. 1738) National Gallery
- Piazza san Marco, c. 1740, Cleveland (Ohio), Cleveland Museum of Art
- The Grand Canal in Venice (c. 1740) Musée des Beaux-Arts de Lyon
- Capriccio with the Campidoglio (c. 1742) Galleria Nazionale di Parma
- Piazza del Campidoglio with Santa Maria d'Aracoeli, Rome (c. 1743) Petworth House
- Venice - the campo dell'Arsenale (c. 1743), National Gallery of Canada, Ottawa
- View of Piazza san Marco Museo civico Amedeo Lia, La Spezia
- The ponte delle Navi in Verona (1746–1747) View looking north at Powis Castle, view looking south on long-term loan to National Gallery of Scotland
- The Tiber with the Church of San Giovanni dei Fiorentini, Rome (about 1742–1744), Toledo Museum of Art, United States
- View of the Tiber in Rome with the Castel Sant'Angelo (1743 or 1744), Detroit Institute of Arts, United States

==== Other ====
- Piazza del Campidoglio with Santa Maria d'Aracoeli, Rome (c. 1742–43), Petworth House
- Rovine del Foro romano (c. 1743), National Gallery of Victoria, Melbourne
- View of Vaprio d'Adda (1744), Metropolitan Museum of Art, New York
- View of the Villa Perabò poi Melzi in Gazzada (c. 1744), Pinacoteca di Brera, Milan
- View of Turin with the Palazzo Reale (1745) Galleria Sabauda, Turin
- View of the old bridge over the Po in Turin (1745) Galleria Sabauda, Turin

=== Dresden and Saxony ===
- Dresden From the Right Bank of the Elbe Above the Augustus Bridge (1747) Gemäldegalerie Alte Meister
- The New Market in Dresden (c. 1747) Hermitage Museum, St Petersburg
- The Hofkirche in Dresden with the castle and the Augustus bridge (Dresden from the left bank of the Elbe) (1748) Pinacoteca Giovanni e Marella Agnelli, Turin
- The New Market in Dresden seen from Moritzstrasse (c. 1750) Pinacoteca Giovanni e Marella Agnelli, Turin
- View of Dresden with the Frauenkirche (1750–1752) Gemäldegalerie Alte Meister, Dresden
- Square with the Kreuzkirche in Dresden (1751–1752) Hermitage Museum, St Petersburg
- Marketplace at Pirna (c. 1764) Museum of Fine Arts, Houston
- Ruins of the Kreuzkirche, Dresden (c. 1765) Kunstmuseum Zürich, Switzerland

==== 1756–1758 series ====
- The Fortress of Königstein: Courtyard with the Brunnenhaus Manchester Art Gallery
- The Fortress of Königstein: Courtyard with the Magdalenenburg Manchester Art Gallery
- The Fortress of Königstein from the North National Gallery, London
- 'The Fortress of Königstein from the South-West (private collection, Earl of Derby)
- The Fortress of Königstein (National Gallery of Art, Washington)

=== Warsaw ===
- Church of the Sisters of St Bernard and the Column of Sigismund III in Warsaw from the descent towards the Vistula (1768–1770) Royal Castle, Warsaw
- View of Warsaw with the Vistula from the Praga Suburb (1770) Royal Castle, Warsaw
- View of the Wilanów Meadows (1775) Royal Castle, Warsaw
- Miodowa Street (1777) Royal Castle, Warsaw
- Krasinski Square in Warsaw (1778) Royal Castle, Warsaw
- Iron-Gate Square in Warsaw (1779) Royal Castle, Warsaw
- The Carmelite Church in Warsaw (1780) Royal Castle, Warsaw

=== Other ===
- Das kaiserliche Lustschloß Schönbrunn, Ehrenhofseite (1759–1760) Kunsthistorisches Museum, Vienna
- Vienna seen from the Belvedere (1758–1761) Kunsthistorisches Museum, Vienna
- Capriccio with Christ Driving the Moneylenders from the Temple (1765–1766) National Museum, Warsaw
- Capriccio with a River and Bridge (c. 1745) Thyssen-Bornemisza Museum, Madrid

== Gallery ==
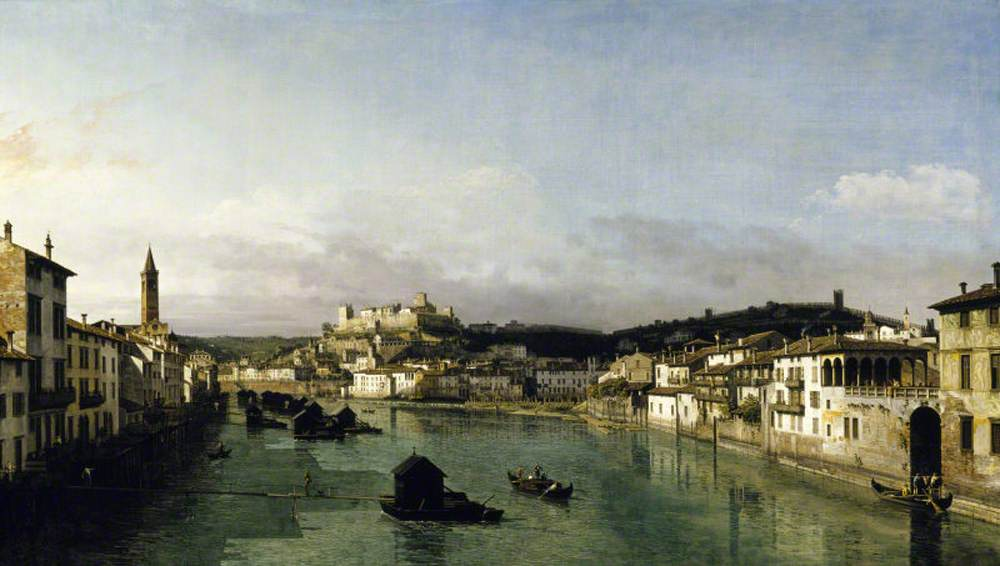
View of Verona from the Ponte Nuovo, 1745-47

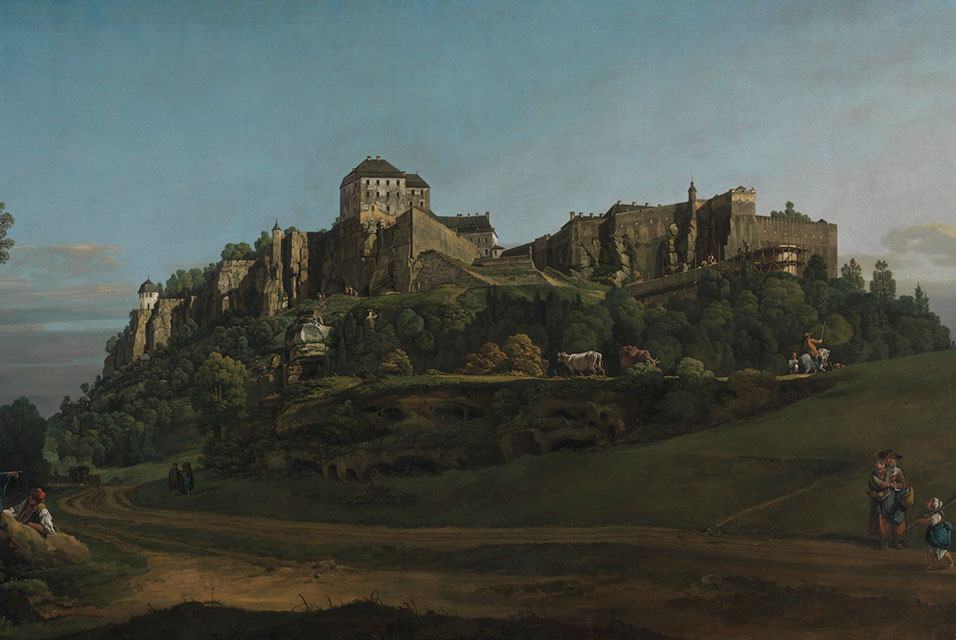
The Fortress of Königstein from the North, 1758

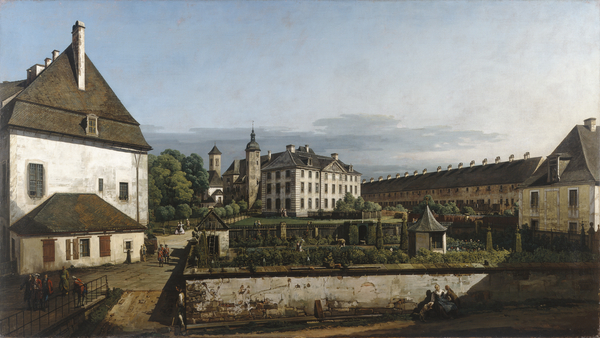
The Fortress of Königstein Courtyard with the Brunnenhaus, 1758

The Fortress of Konigstein Courtyard with the Magdalenenburg, 1758

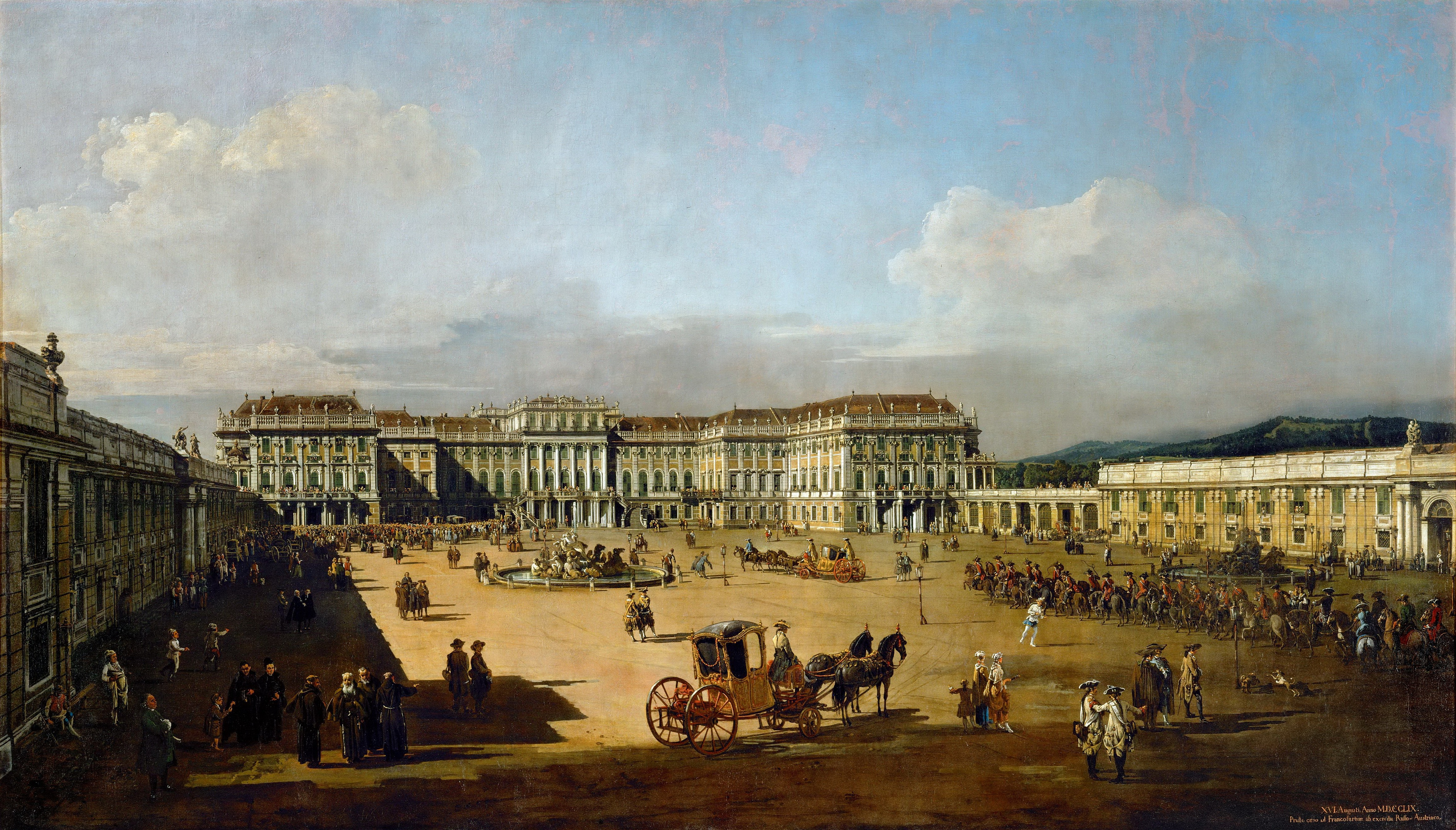
The Imperial Pleasure Palace Schönbrunn, Courtyard Side, 1760

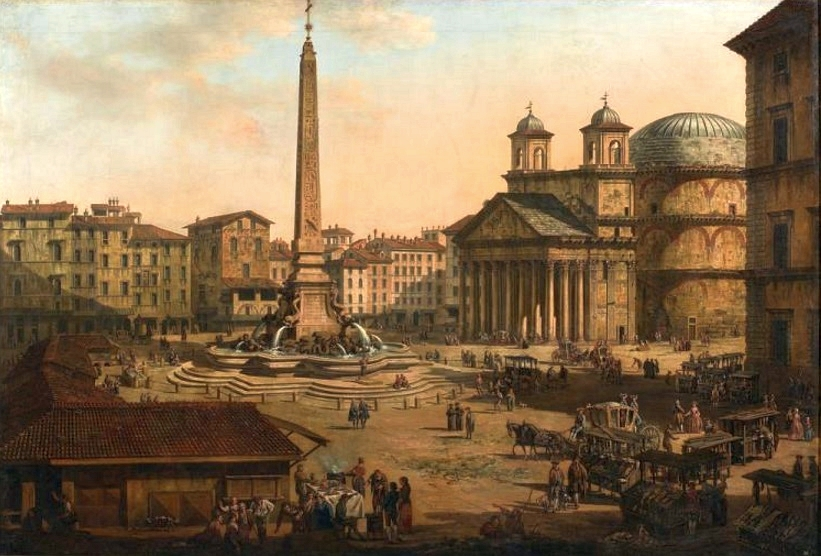
Piazza della Rotonda and the Pantheon, 1769

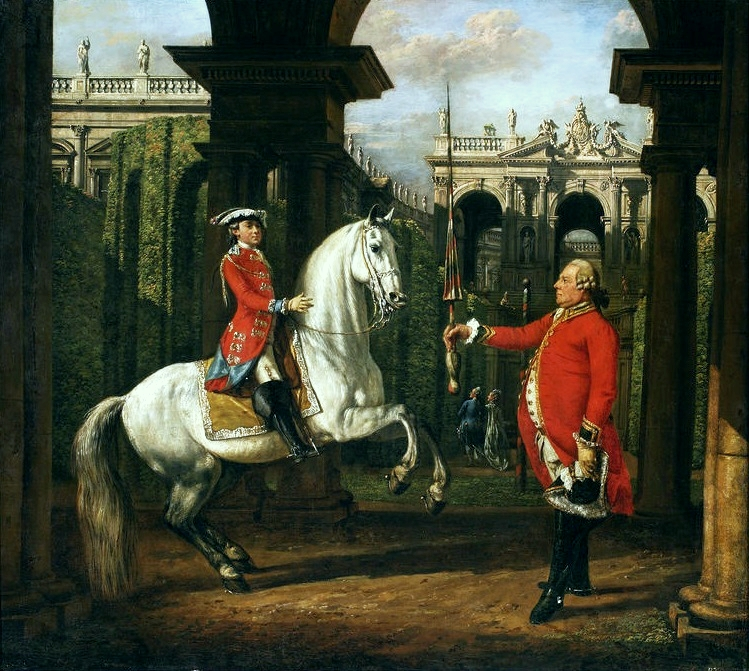
Colonel Königsfels Teaching Prince Poniatowski to Ride, 1773

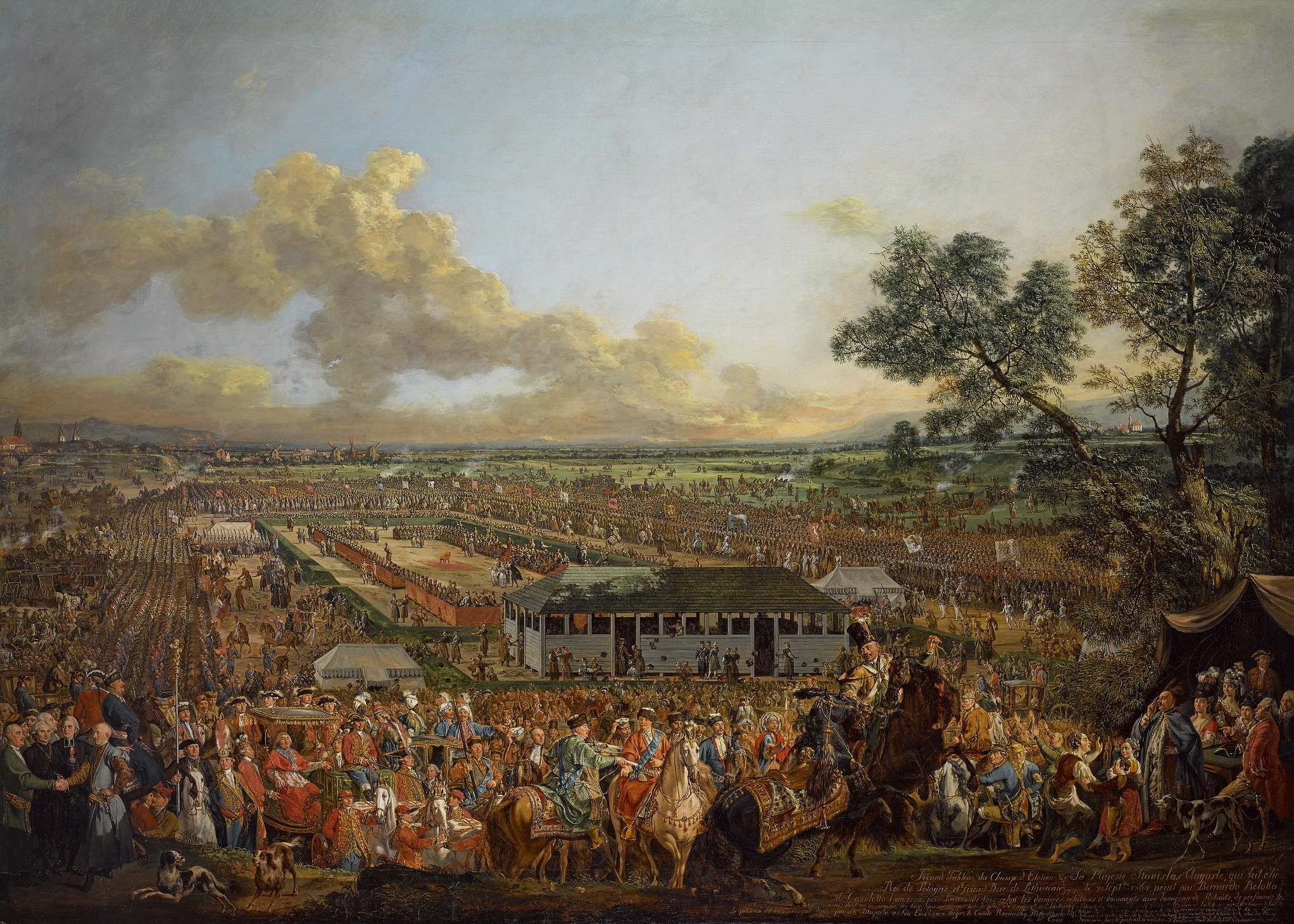
The Election of Stanisław August, 1778
