= 1679 in art =

Events from the year 1679 in art.

== Events ==
- (unknown)

== Works ==
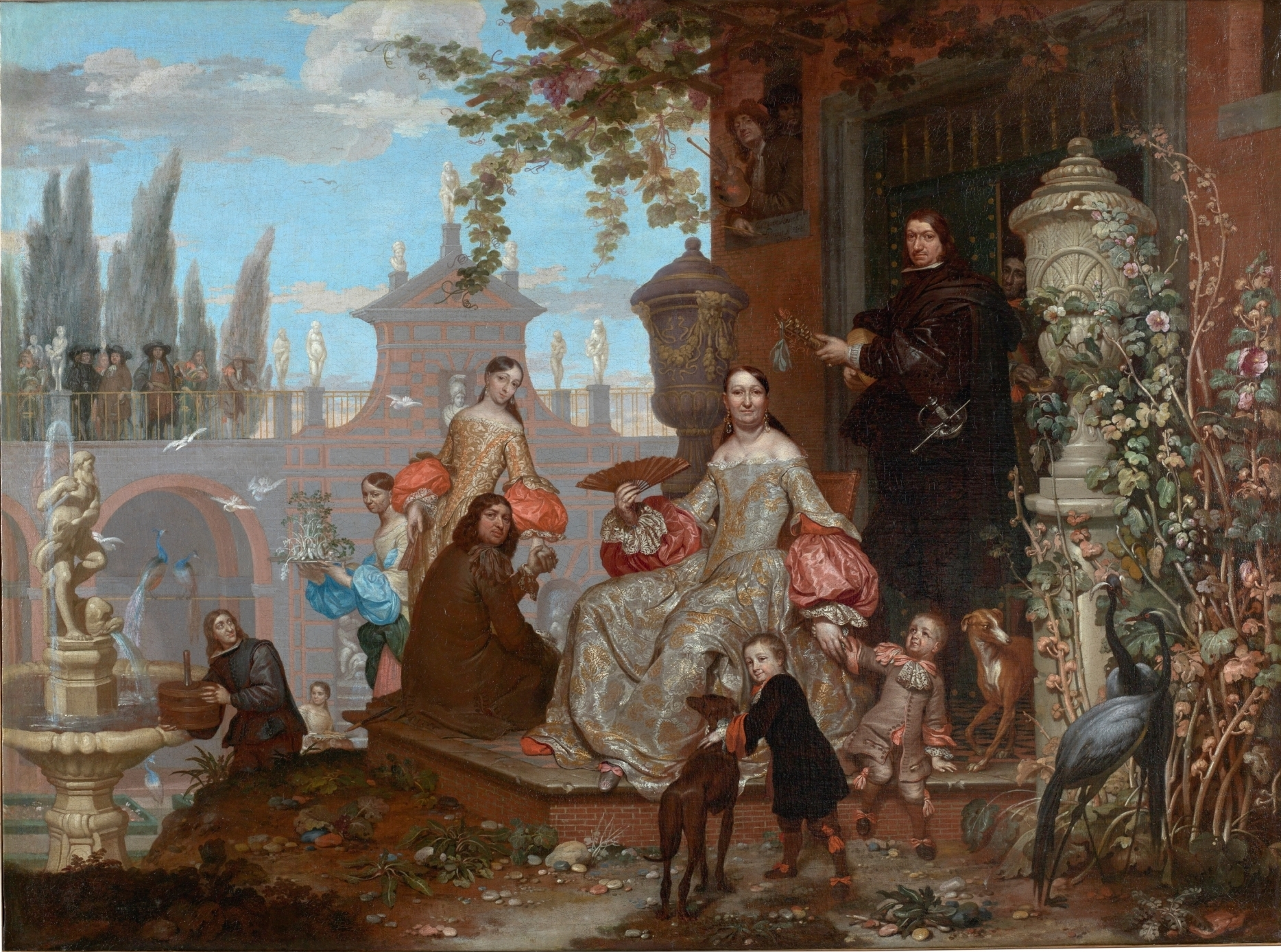
Jan van Kessel the Younger – Portrait of a family in a garden. In this group the painter portrays himself at the window.

- François de Troy – Portrait of Nils Bielke
- Cornelius Jansen (attributed) – Memorial painting of Isaac Bargrave in Canterbury Cathedral
- Jan van Kessel – Portrait of a family in a garden

== Publications ==
- First part of Jieziyuan Huazhuan ("Manual of the Mustard Seed Garden"), a manual on landscape painting, published in China

== Births ==
- January 27 – Jean-François de Troy, French painter (died 1752)
- April 2 - Marcellus Laroon the Younger, English painter and draughtsman (died 1772)
- April 24 - Francesco Mancini, Italian painter (died 1758)
- date unknown
  - Elias Baeck, German painter and engraver (died 1747)
  - Giuseppe Dallamano, Italian painter of quadratura in Turin (died 1758)
  - Francesco Fernandi, Italian painter (died 1740)

== Deaths ==
- January 23 – Girolamo Forabosco, Italian painter (born 1605)
- January 29 – Carlo Ceresa, Italian painter of portraitures, altarpieces and religious works (born 1609)
- February 3 (bur.) – Jan Steen, Dutch genre painter (born 1626)
- February 27 (bur.) – Joan Carlile, English professional portrait painter (born c. 1606)
- March 27 – Abraham Mignon, Dutch flower painter born at Frankfurt (born 1640)
- April 18 (bur.) - John Verelst Anglo-Dutch artist (born 1648)
- April 22 – Giovanni Battista Passeri, Italian painter of genre and still life paintings (born 1610)
- June 15 – Guillaume Courtois, French painter and etcher (born 1628)
- October - Barent Avercamp, Dutch painter (born 1612)
- December
  - Jan van de Cappelle, Dutch Golden Age painter of seascapes and winter landscapes (born 1626)
  - Jan Victors, Dutch painter of subjects from the Bible (born 1619)
- date unknown
  - Baldassare Bianchi, Italian painter of the Baroque period (born 1612)
  - Tomas de Aguiar, Spanish painter of the Baroque period (born unknown)
  - Josse de Corte, French sculptor (born 1627)
  - Felipe Diricksen, Spanish Baroque painter primarily of portraits and religious paintings (born 1590)
  - Robert Streater, English landscape, history, still-life, and portrait artist, architectural painter and etcher (born 1621)
