= 1747 in art =

Events from the year 1747 in art.

== Events ==
- August – Jean-Bernard, abbé Le Blanc, writes an influential letter on the subject of the Paris Salon.
- Charles-Amédée-Philippe van Loo joins the Académie Royale de Peinture et de Sculpture. Later in the year he marries Marie-Marguerite Lebrun.

== Works ==
- Bernardo Bellotto – View of Verona from the Ponte Nuovo
- Francis Bindon – Portrait of Richard Baldwin, Provost of Trinity College, Dublin
- Canaletto – London Seen Through an Arch of Westminster Bridge
- Thomas Gainsborough – Wooded Landscape with a Peasant Resting (Tate Britain)
- Matthäus Günther – Frescos in Amorbach Abbey (1742–47)
- Charles-Joseph Natoire
  - Portrait of Louis, Dauphin of France
  - Saint Stephen and the False Witnesses (for Abbey of Saint-Germain-des-Prés)
  - Triumph of Bacchus (Musée du Louvre)
- Samuel Scott – Wager's Action off Cartagena
- Gervase Spencer – Portrait miniatures
- Richard Wilson
  - Dover Castle
  - Portrait of Flora MacDonald

== Births ==
- January 4 – Dominique Vivant, French artist, writer, diplomat, author and archaeologist (died 1825)
- March 8 – Johann Peter Melchior, German porcelain modeller (died 1825)
- September 30 – Friedrich Justin Bertuch, German patron of the arts (died 1822)
- December 8 – Louis Gerverot, French porcelain painter (died 1829)
- date unknown
  - William Ellis, English engraver (died 1810)
  - Giuseppe Quaglio, Italian painter and stage designer (died 1828)
  - Jean Simeon Rousseau de la Rottière, French decorative painter (died 1820)
  - Margareta Seuerling, Swedish actor and theater director (died 1820)
  - Shiba Kōkan, born Andō Kichirō, Japanese painter and printmaker (died 1818)
  - Francis Wheatley, English painter and engraver (died 1801)

== Deaths ==
- January 26 – Willem van Mieris, Dutch painter from Leyden (born 1662)
- April 3 – Francesco Solimena, Italian painter and draughtsmen (born 1657)
- July 17 – Giuseppe Maria Crespi, Italian painter of the Bolognese School (born 1665)
- November 7 – Giuseppe Melani, Italian painter, active mainly in Pisa (born 1673)
- date unknown
  - Elias Baeck, German painter and engraver (born 1679)
  - Maurice Baquoy, French engraver (born 1680)
  - Giovanni Battista Canossa, Italian wood engraver (born unknown)
  - Claude Charles, French historical and decorative painter (born 1661)
  - Tommaso Costanzi, Italian gem engraver of the late-Baroque period (born 1700)
  - Michael Ignaz Mildorfer, Austrian painter (born 1690)
