= Canosa =

Canosa may refer to:

- Canosa (surname), surname
- Canosa di Puglia, town and comune in the province of Barletta-Andria-Trani, Apulia, southern Italy
- Canosa Sannita, comune and town in the province of Chieti, Abruzzo, central Italy
- Canosa vases, type of pottery belonging to ancient Apulian vase painting

== See also ==
- Canossa (disambiguation)
