= Canossa (disambiguation) =

Canossa is a town in Italy.

Canossa may also refer to:

- Canossa Academy Lipa, in the Philippines
- Canossa Castle, in Italy
- Canossa College, in Hong Kong
- Canossa Hospital, in Hong Kong
- Canossa School of Santa Rosa, Laguna
- Canossa, Edmonton
- House of Canossa, noble family
- Giovanni Battista Canossa (died 1747), Italian wood engraver
- Luigi di Canossa (1809–1900), cardinal
- Palazzo Canossa, Verona

== See also ==
- Canosa (disambiguation)
