= Dallamano =

Dallamano is an Italian surname. Notable people with the surname include:

- Giuseppe Dallamano (1679–1758), Italian painter
- Massimo Dallamano (1917–1976), Italian director and director of photography
- Simone Dallamano (born 1983), Italian footballer
