= Gregorio Lazzarini =

Italian painter

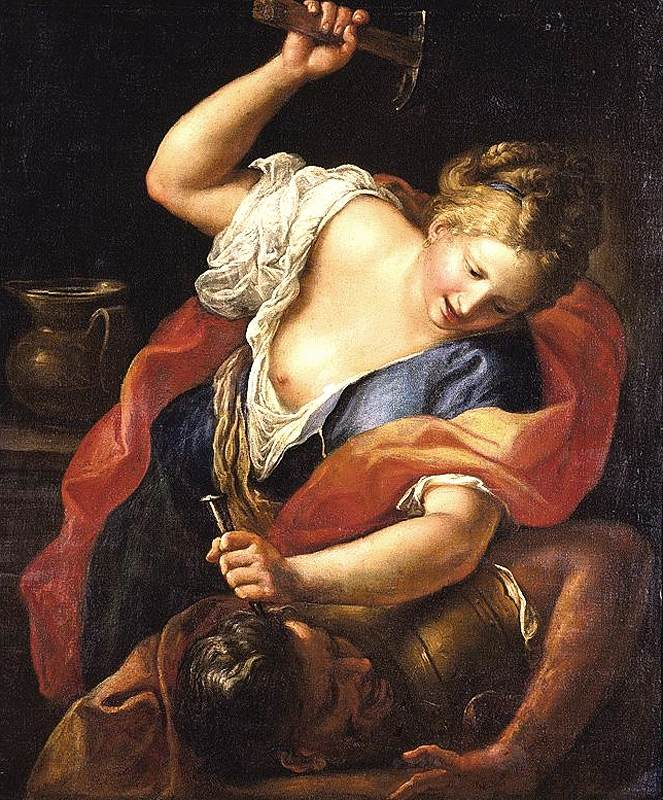
- Gregorio Lazzarini, ''Jael and Sisera (1700–1702), Oil on canvas, 117 x 95 cm, priv. col.
- Born: 1657; Venice, Republic of Venice
- Died: 10 November 1730 (aged 72–73); Venice, Republic of Venice
- Education: Francesco Rosa; Girolamo Forabosco; Pietro della Vecchia
- Occupation: painter
- Movement: Baroque

Gregorio Lazzarini (1657 – 10 November 1730) was an Italian painter of mythological, religious and historical subjects, as well as portraits. One of the most successful Venetian artists of the day, a prominent teacher, and father to a significant school of painting, he is best known for having first trained Giambattista Tiepolo, who joined his workshop in 1710 at the age of fourteen. His own style was somewhat eclectic.

== Life ==
Born in Venice, the son of a barber, (Note: The contemporary biography, Vita di Gregorio Lazzarini by Vincenzo da Canal, which was originally compiled in 1732 (published, 1809), provides an essential source of information on Lazzarini's life and works.) he was the brother of the proficient painter, Elisabetta Lazzarini (1662–1729). He trained initially with the Genovese painter Francesco Rosa, then with Girolamo Forabosco, and lastly in the studio of Pietro della Vecchia.

He joined the painters' guild in Venice in 1687. Active in Venice until at least 1715, he spent most of his life in the Venetian Republic. He was a prolific painter. He was reputed to be a patient teacher who imparted a broad knowledge of artistic styles for the portrayal of mythological and historical subjects; according to his contemporary biographer, Vincenzo da Canal, "the young who desired to get ahead in the pictorial arts chose Lazzarini as their master". (Note: A nobleman from Vicenza, da Canal wished to record the achievements of teacher and student alike. He acknowledges that Tiepolo quickly abandoned Lazzarini's "diligent manner, and, being all fire and spirit, adopted one that was rapid and free".) Other pupils of Lazzarini included Gaspare Diziani and Bartolomeo Ignazio Capello.

Some of his works decorate the Sala dello Scrutinio of the Doge’s Palace in Venice. A group of his paintings are on view inside the Sala San Tommaso at the basilica of Santi Giovanni e Paolo. Among his major works is a canvas depicting the Charity of San Lorenzo Giustiniani for the Patriarcal house at San Pietro di Castello. His overtly academic style, which changed little during his career, combined the solidity of Emilian painting of the Baroque period with the rich colours of the Venetian school.

Lazzarini died on 10 November 1730 in Villabona Veronese (now Villa d'Adige in Badia Polesine), having moved there in September to stay with his brother, the local priest.

== Gallery ==
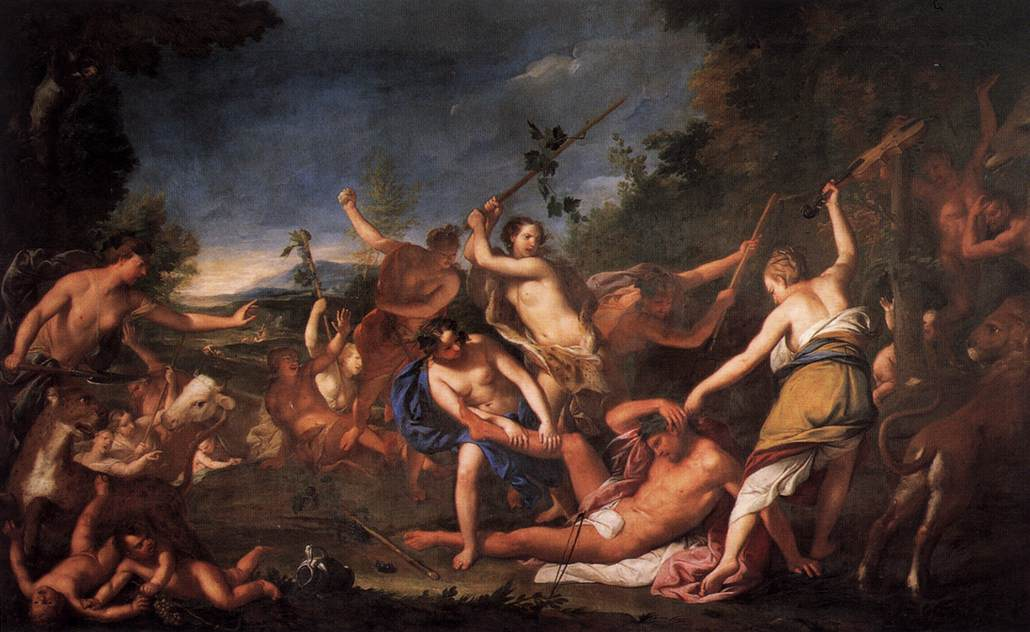
Orpheus and the Bacchantes, Ca' Rezzonico, Venice

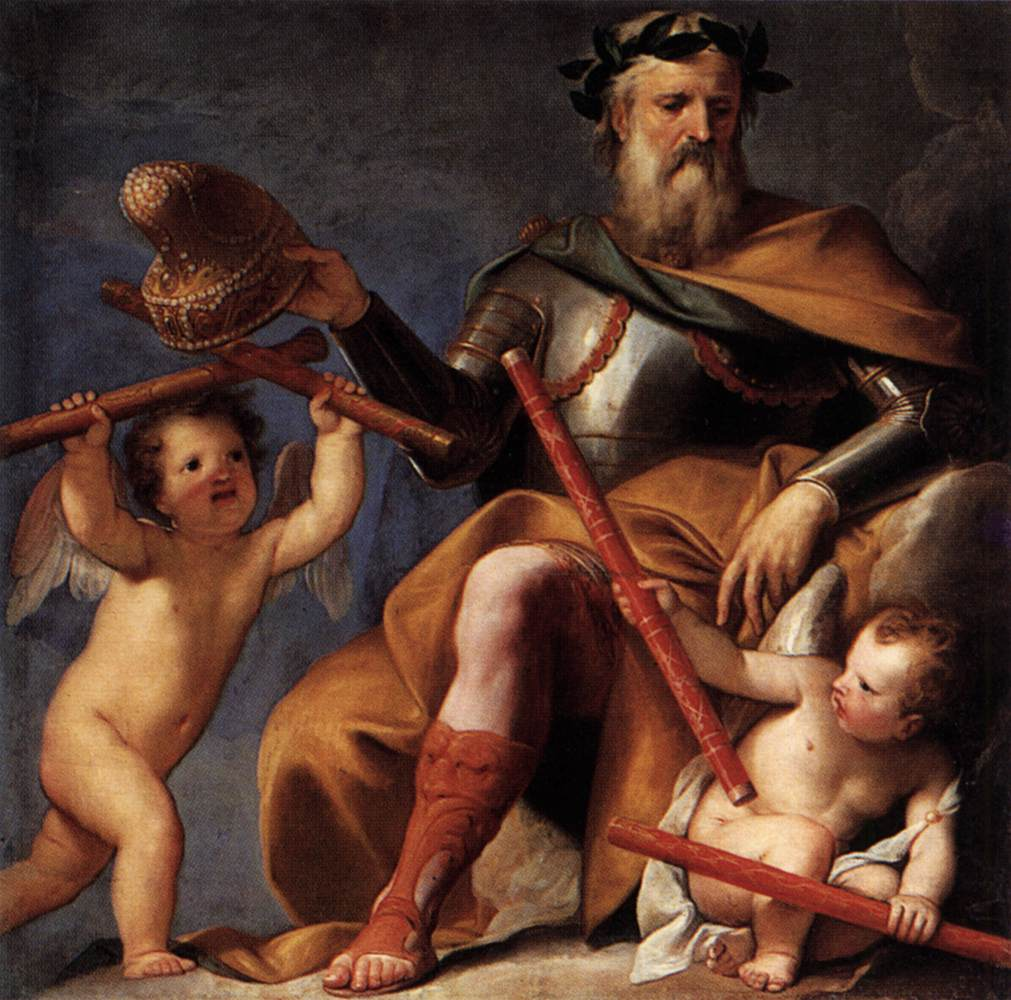
Merit Offers the Command to Doge Morosini, 1694, Doge's Palace, Venice

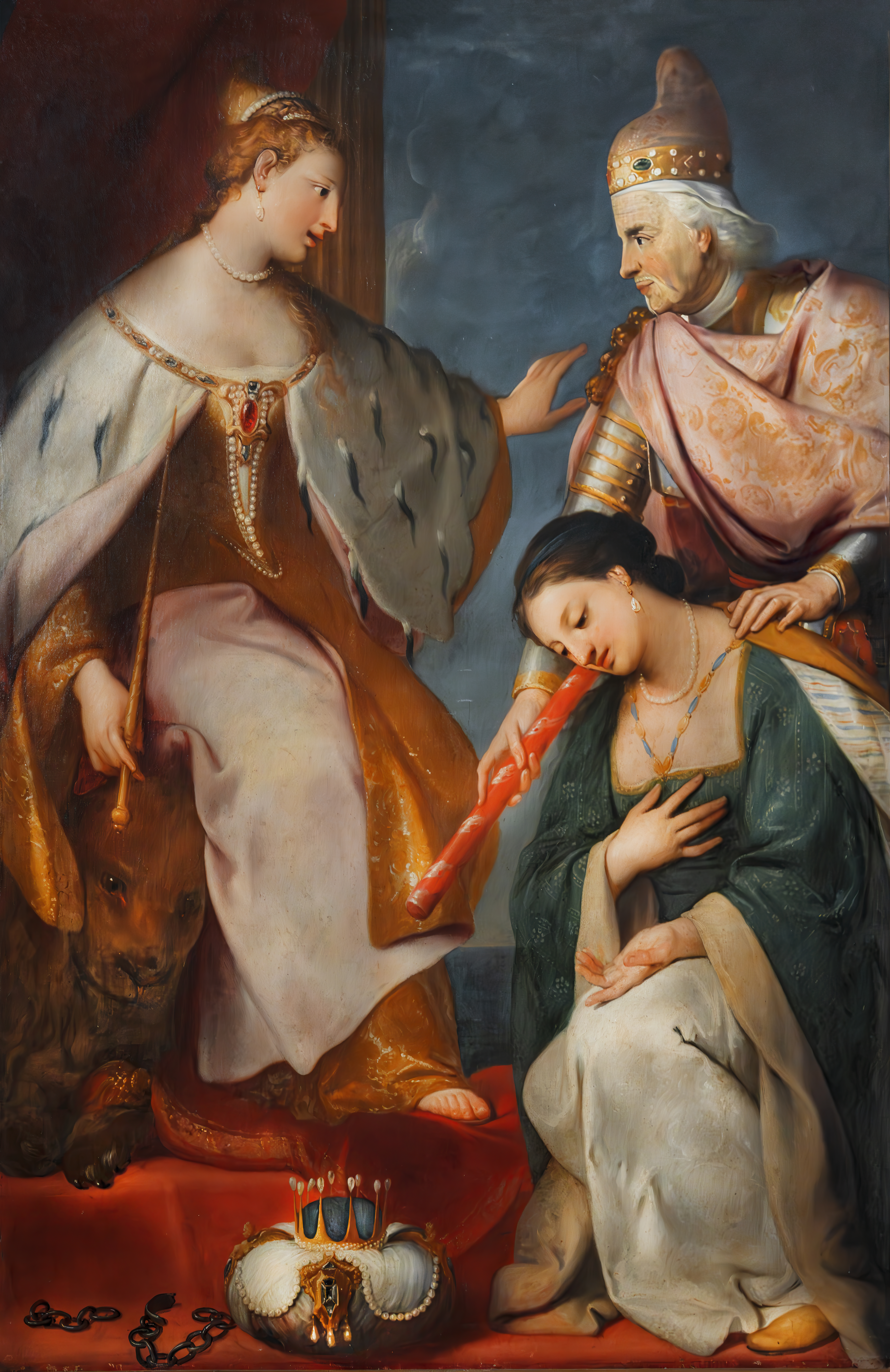
Doge Morosini offers Reconquered Morea to Venice, Museo Correr, Venice

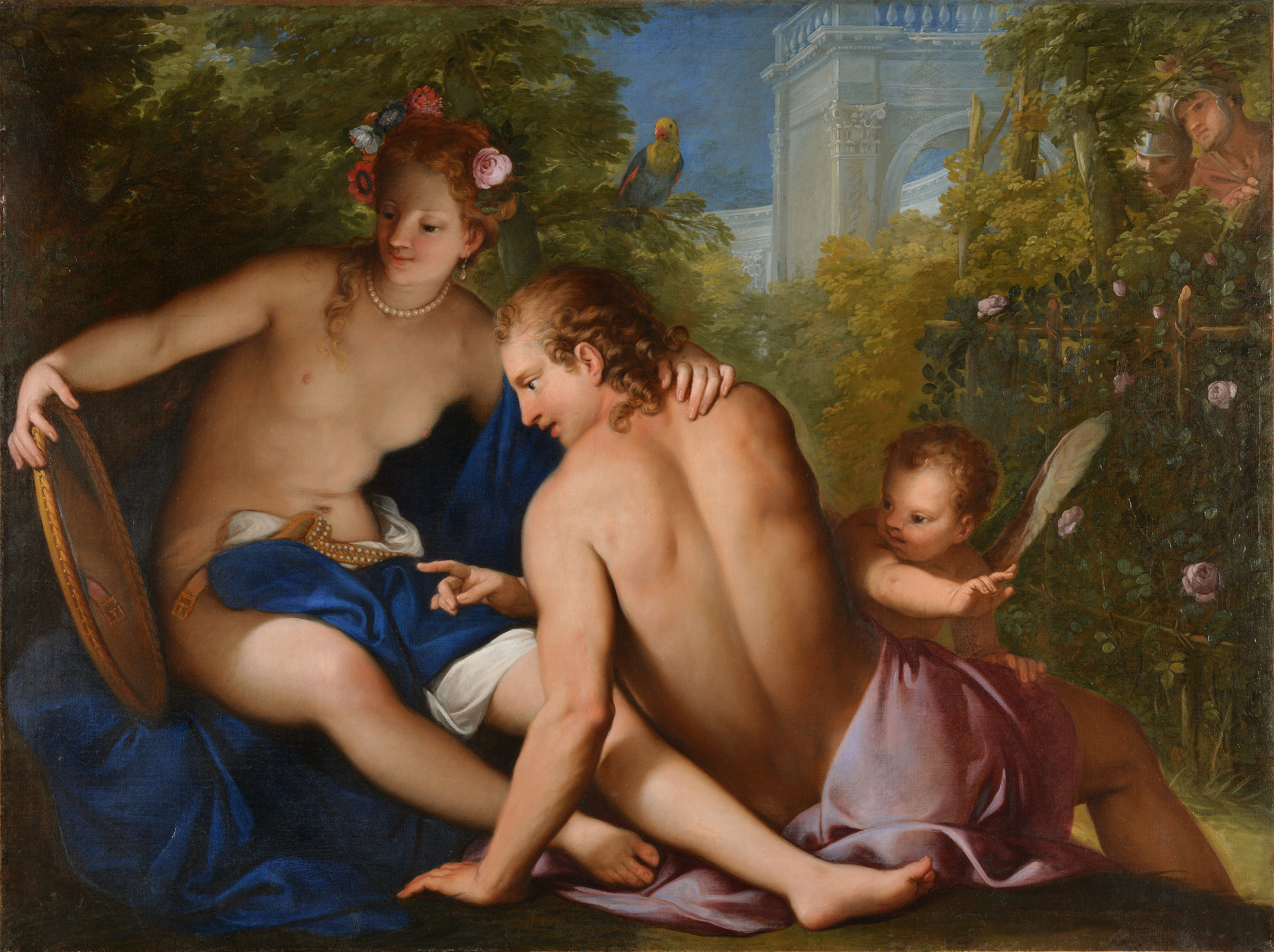
Rinaldo and Armida, National Gallery of Slovenia, Ljubljana

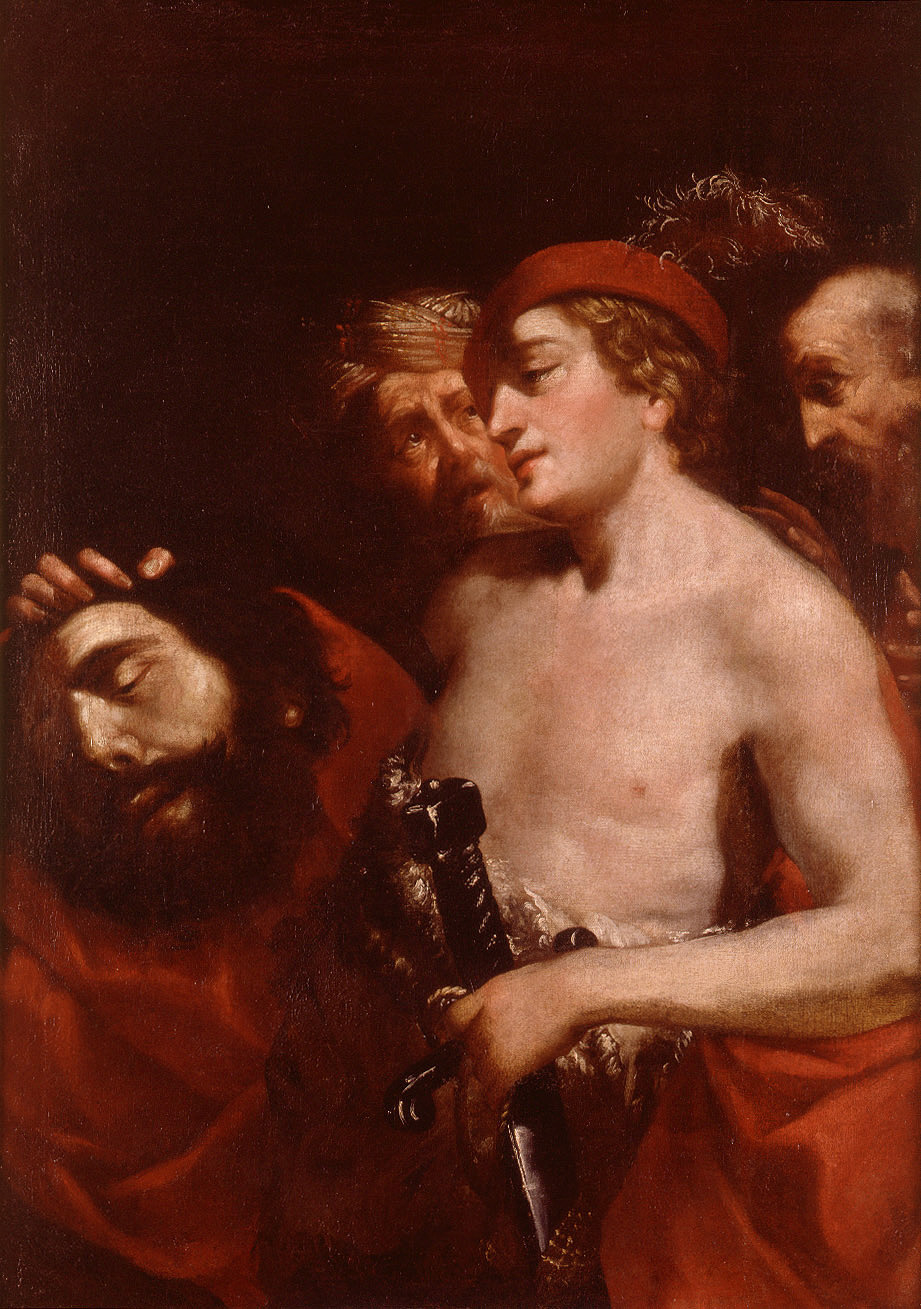
David and Goliath, Museo de Bellas Artes de Valencia

Reason Ordering Temperance to Restrain Avarice, Warrington Museum & Art Gallery, Warrington

== Notes and references ==
Notes

== Bibliography ==
- Bryan, Michael (1889). Walter Armstrong and Robert Edmund Graves (ed.). Dictionary of Painters and Engravers, Biographical and Critical. Vol. II L-Z. London: George Bell and Sons. p. 30.
- Da Canal, Vincenzo (1809). Vita di Gregorio Lazzarini (in Italian). Venice: Stamperia Palese.
- Sorce, Francesco (2005). "LAZZARINI, Gregorio". Dizionario Biografico degli Italiani (in Italian). Vol. 64: Latilla–Levi Montalcini. Rome: Istituto dell'Enciclopedia Italiana. ISBN 978-88-12-00032-6.
