= Francesco Rosa =

Italian painter

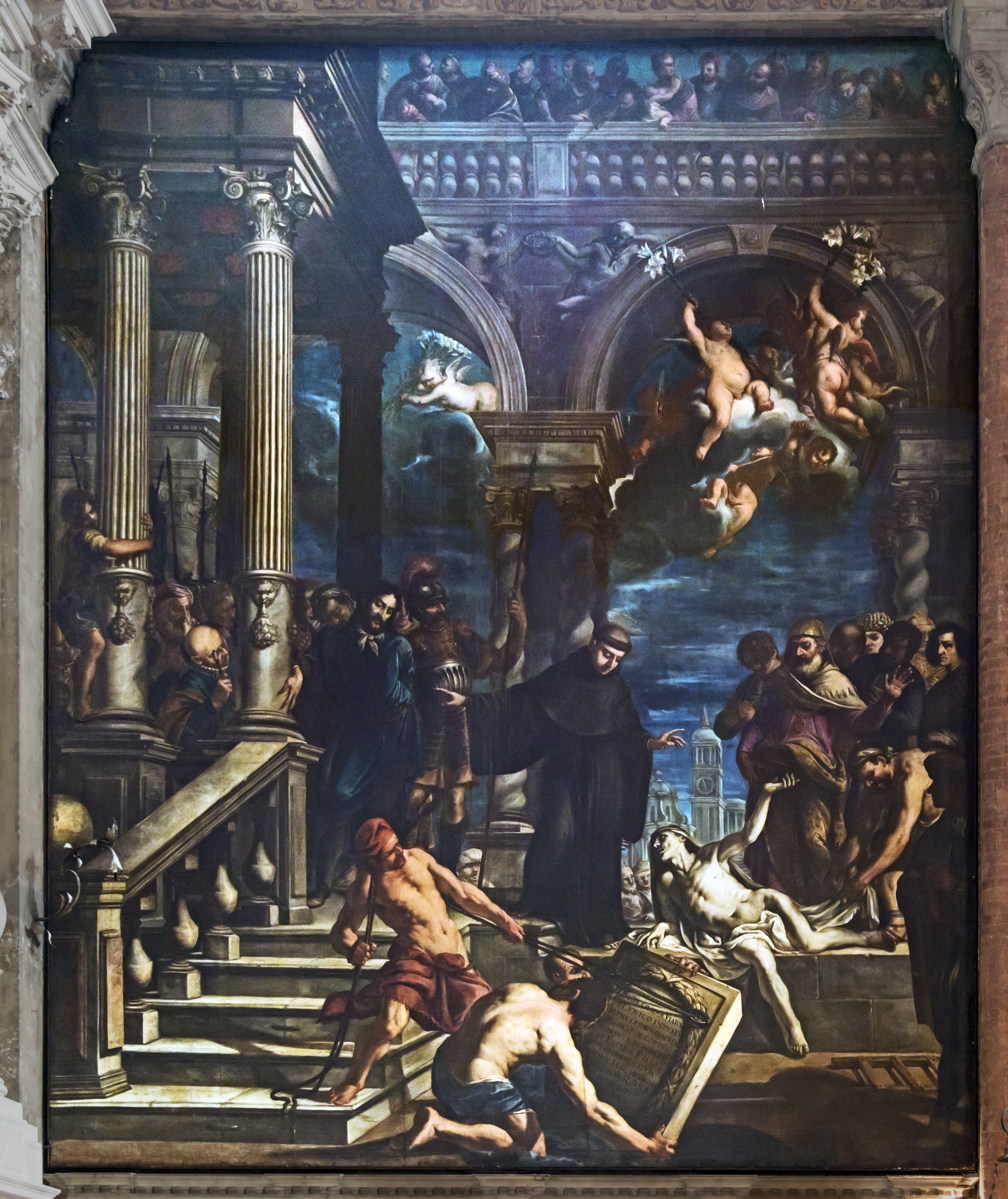
Miracle of Saint Anthony

Francesco Rosa (died 1687) was an Italian painter from Genoa. His works include The Glory of the Eternal Father at Santa Caterina a Magnanapoli and Moses at the Pantheon, both in Rome. Gregorio Lazzarini trained under him.
