= Pietro Bellotti =

Italian painter (1625–1700)

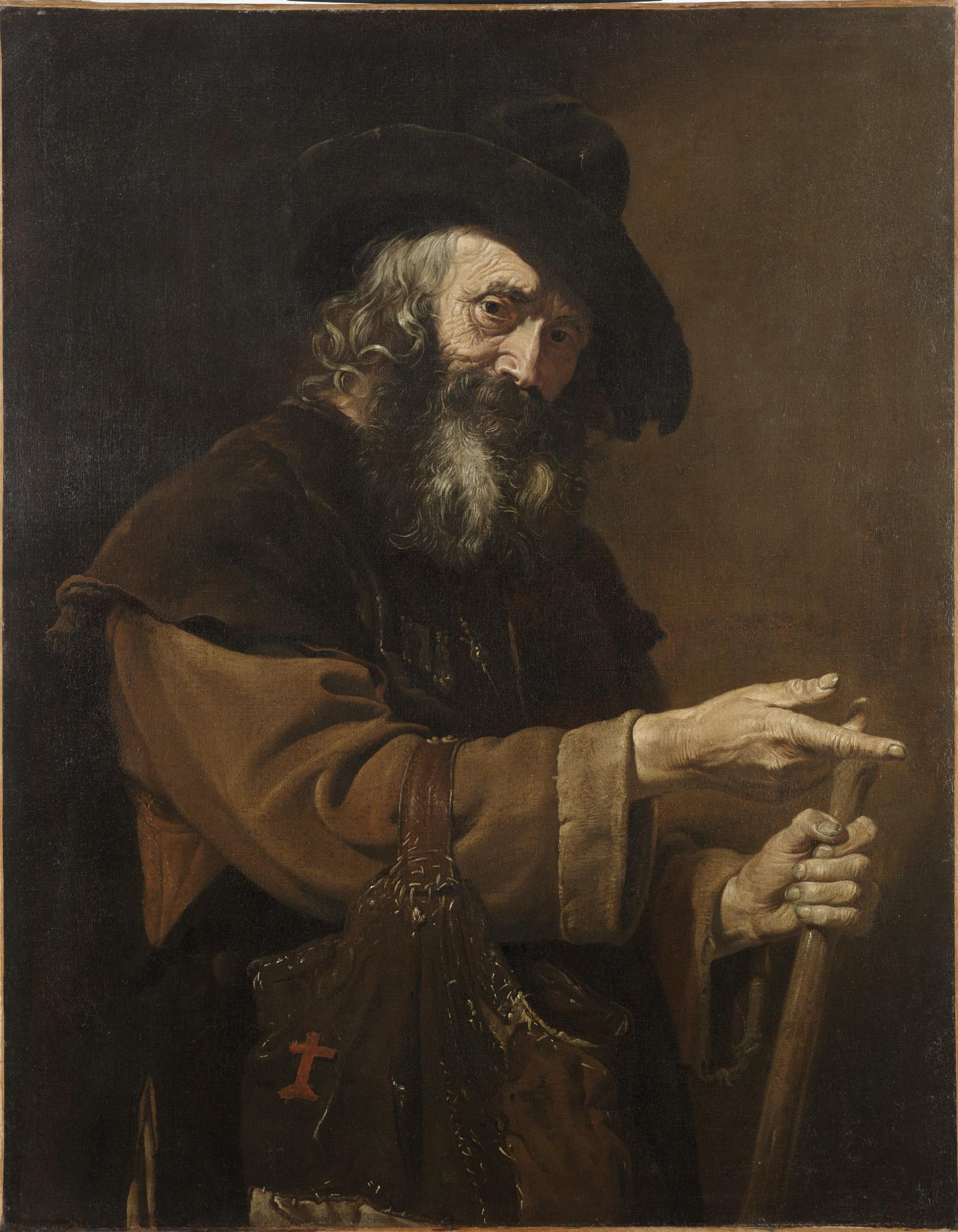
Old Pilgrim, 1660s, Dallas Museum of Art

Pietro Bellotti (1625–1700) was an Italian painter active in the Baroque period.

== Life and work ==
Bellotti was born in Volciano di Salò in 1627 (1625 according to Orlandi), he gained fame as a painter of portraits and heads of characters. He was a pupil of Girolamo Forabosco in Venice. According to Orlandi, he worked for Cardinal Mazzarino, Cardinal Ottoboni (the future Pope Alexander VIII), for the elector of Bavaria and others. He was patronised by Pope Alexander VIII and by the Duke of Uceda. In Mantova, he was "superintendent of the city and villa galleries" for Gonzaga. After wandering from court to court, he returned to Lake Garda and died in poverty in Gargnano in 1700.

His principal works are:

- La Parca Lachesi, from 1654, at the Museum of Stuttgart (replica, signed and dated 1684, at the Pinacoteca di Feltre);
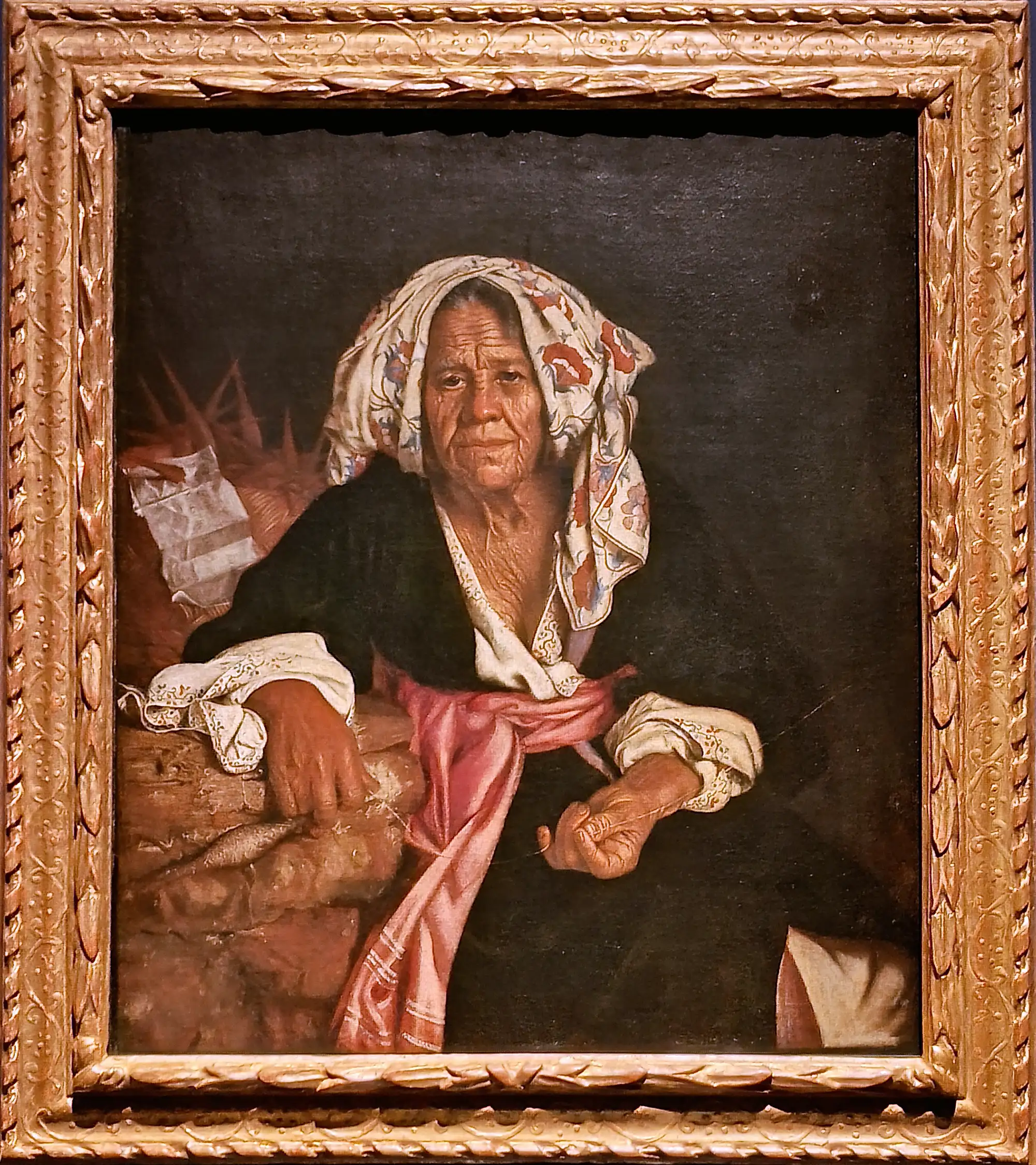
  Pietro Bellotti, The Parcae Lachesis (1654), Staatsgalerie, Stuttgart, Germany
- Self-Portrait, signed and dated 1658, at the Uffizi Gallery, where he is depicted with a cup in his hand and a scroll with the inscription: "Hinc Hilaritas";
- Two Peasants' Heads at the Pinacoteca di Bologna;
- Philosopher in the Pinacoteca di Feltre;
- Old Head at the Correr Museum;
- Medea at the Accademia dei Concordi in Rovigo;
- Maiden with a Turban in the Braunschweig Museum.

He shares the same name with the younger brother of Bernardo Bellotto, a Venetian vedute painter, nephew of Canaletto. This Pietro was born on 22 March 1725 in Venice, and after collaborating with the two painters above, moved to Toulouse, France, where he was active in the local Royal academy, as well as in Nantes (1755,1768), Besançon (1761), Lille (1778–1779), and Paris. In France, he was referred to by a number of names, including le Sieur Canalety and Pietro Bellotti di Caneletty. He is also referred to as Belloti, Belloty, Beloty, or Bellottit. He died in France before 1805.

== Examples of Work ==
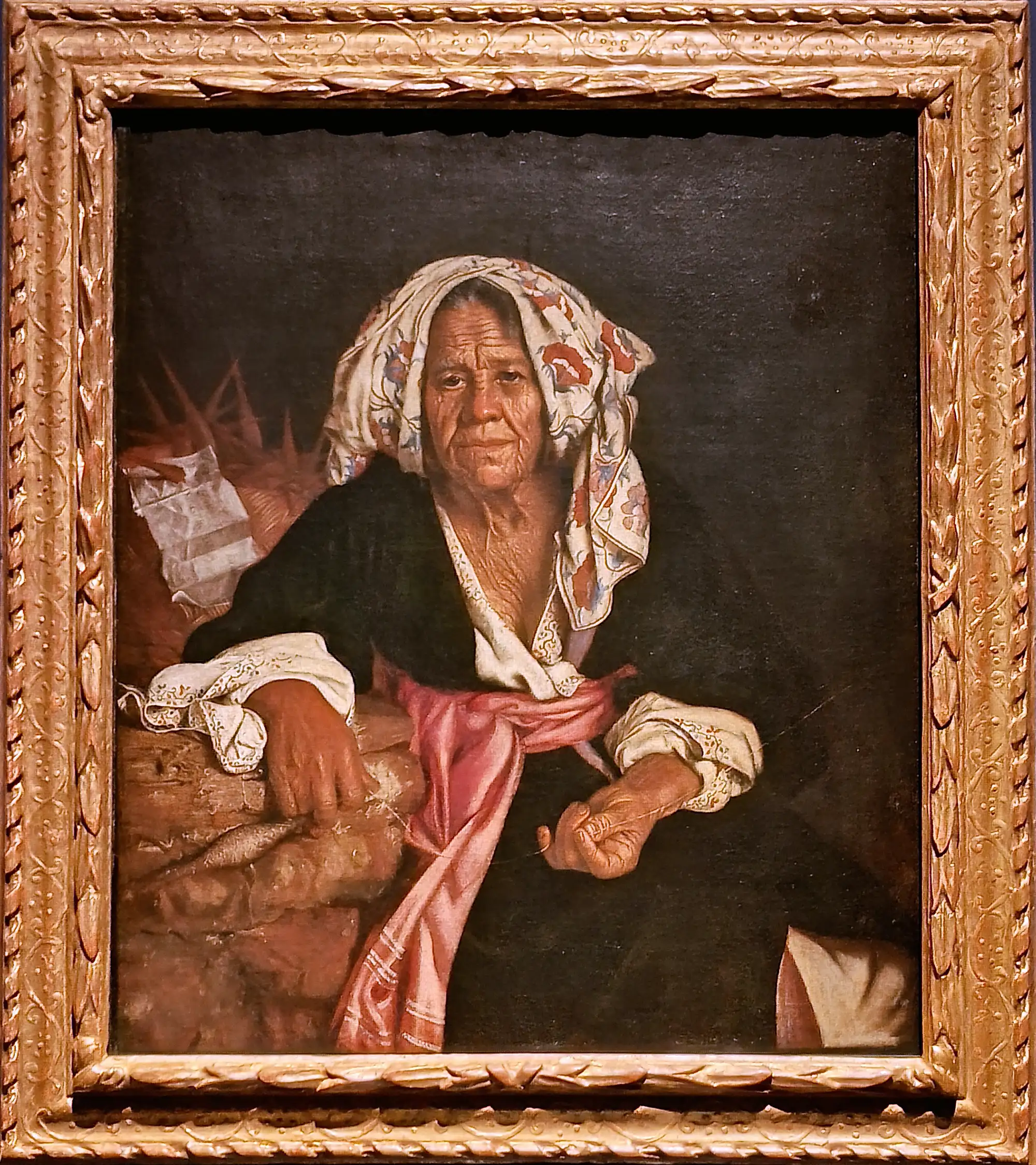
Parcae Lachesis, 1654, Staatsgalerie, Stuttgart, Germany

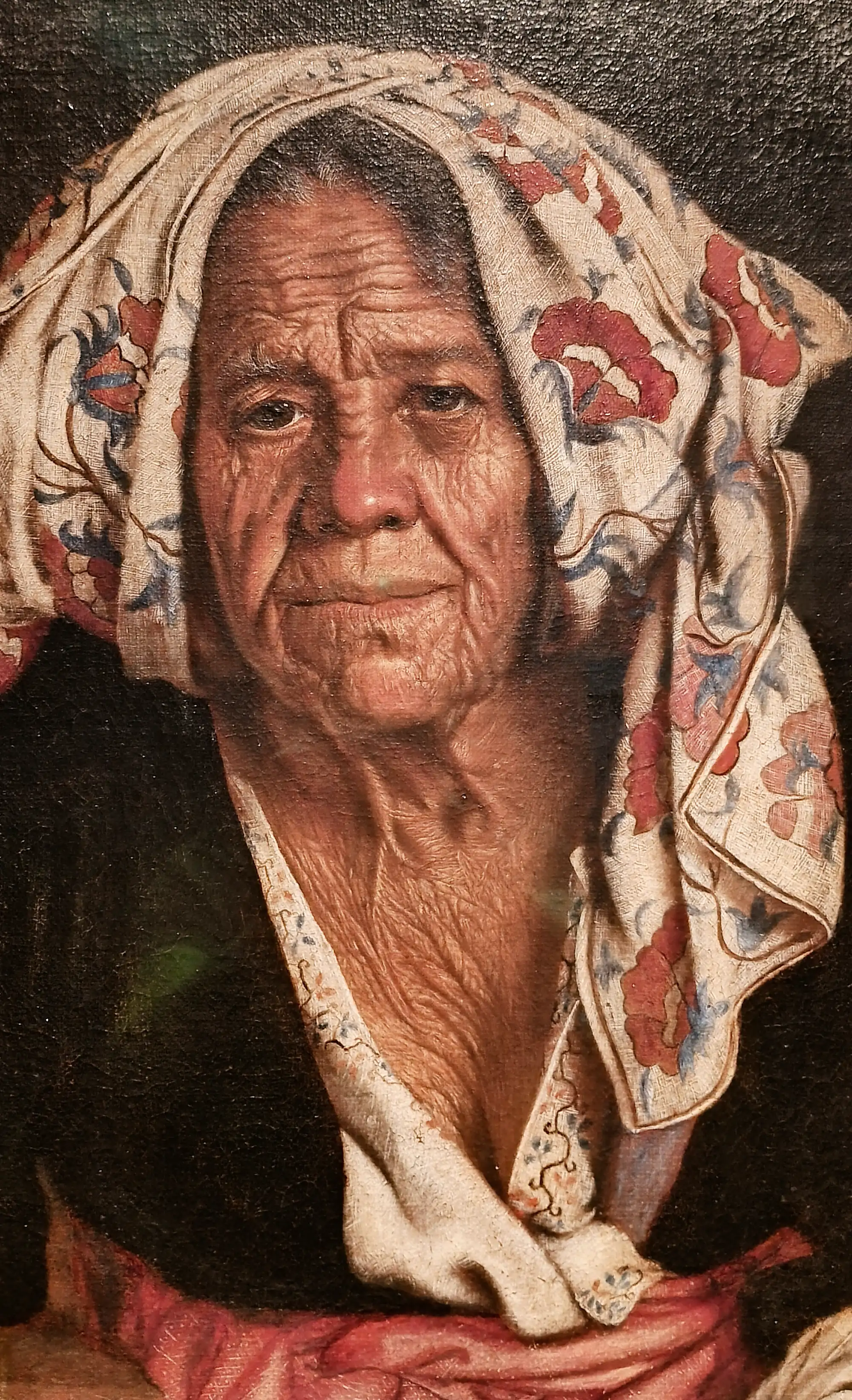
Detail of Parcae Lachesis, 1654, Staatsgalerie, Stuttgart, Germany

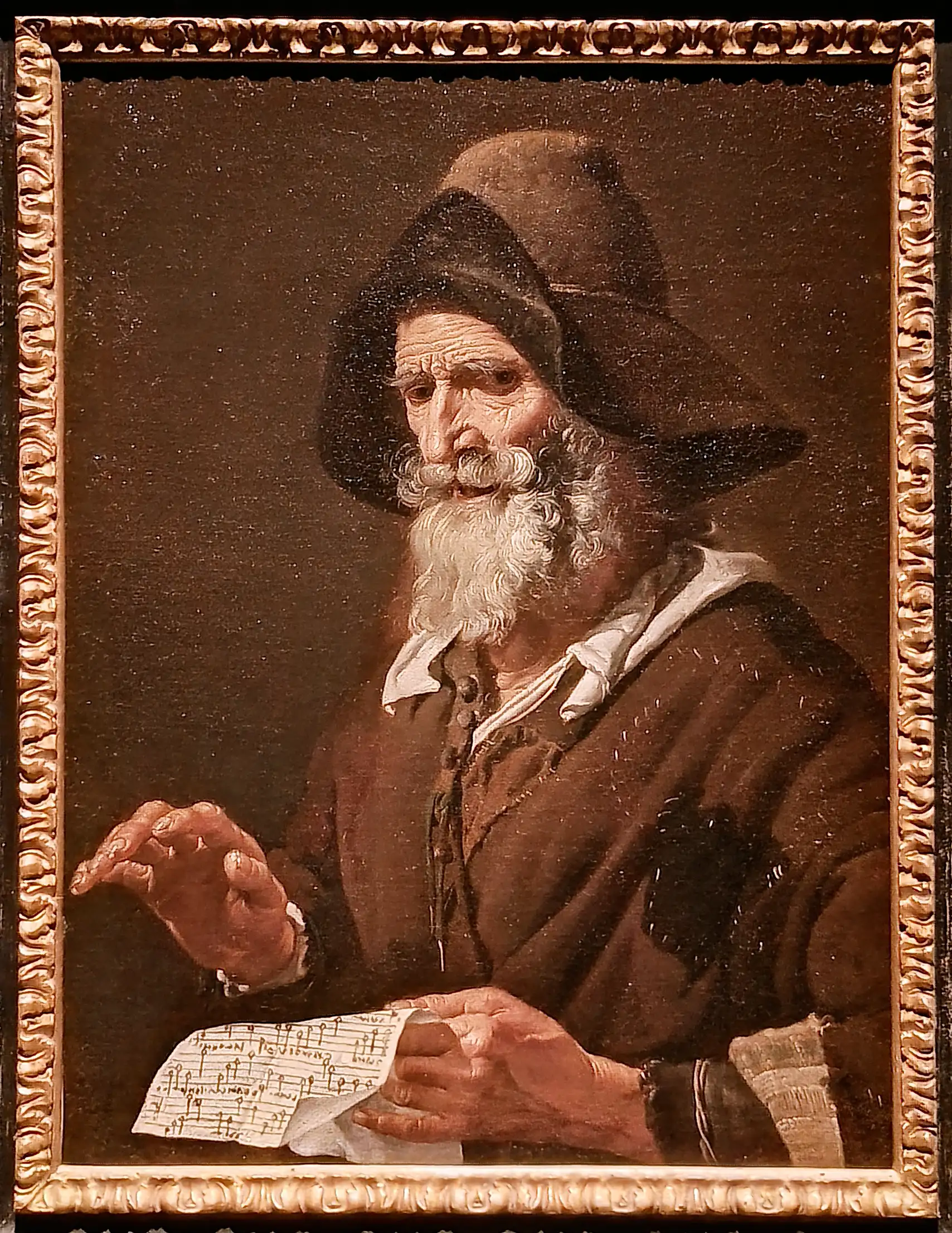
The Old Singer, 1680-1690, Private Collection

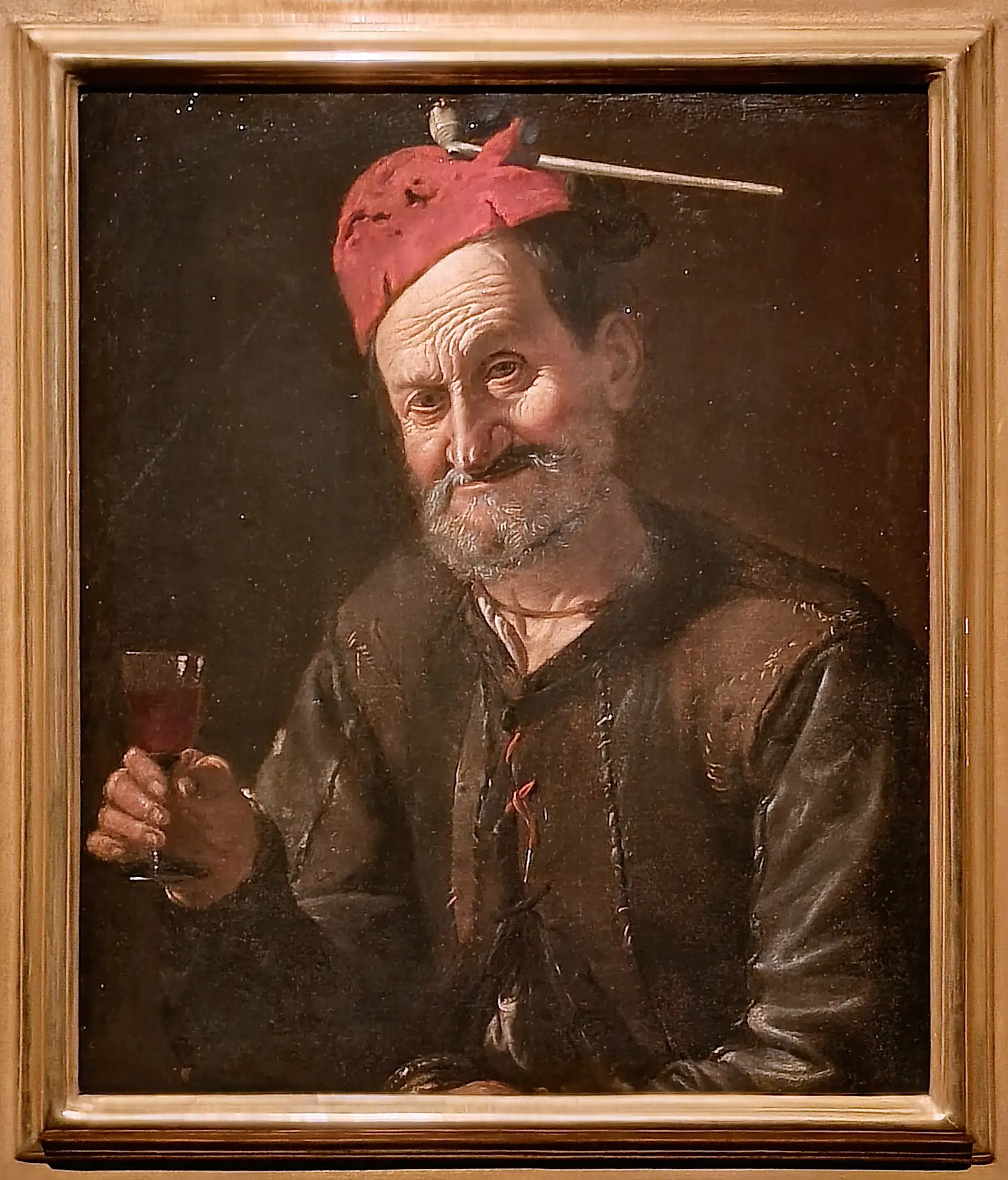
Old Drinker, 1670-1675, Pinacoteca del Castello Sforzesco

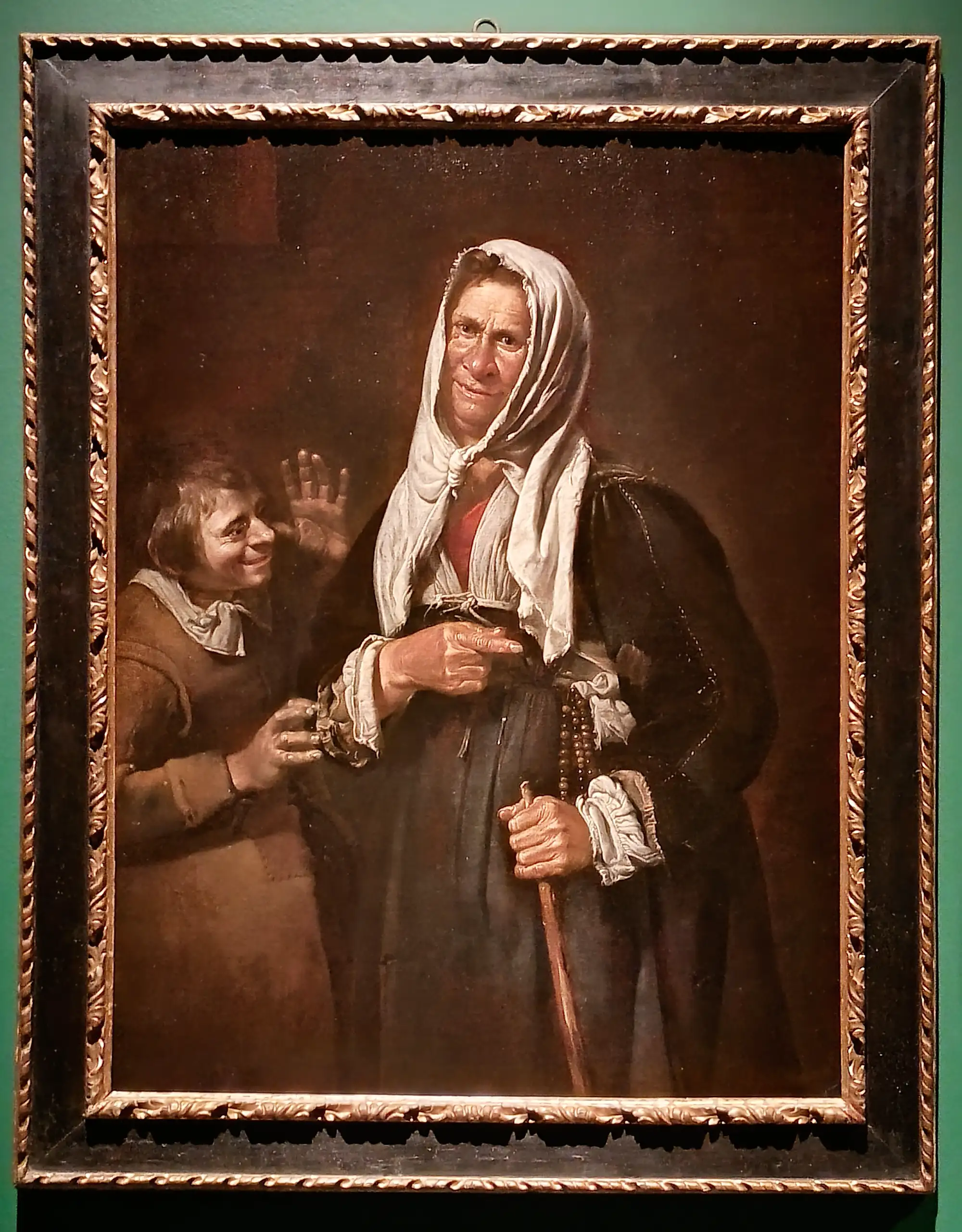
Old Peasant Woman with a Boy, 1680-1690, Museo d'Arte Sorlini

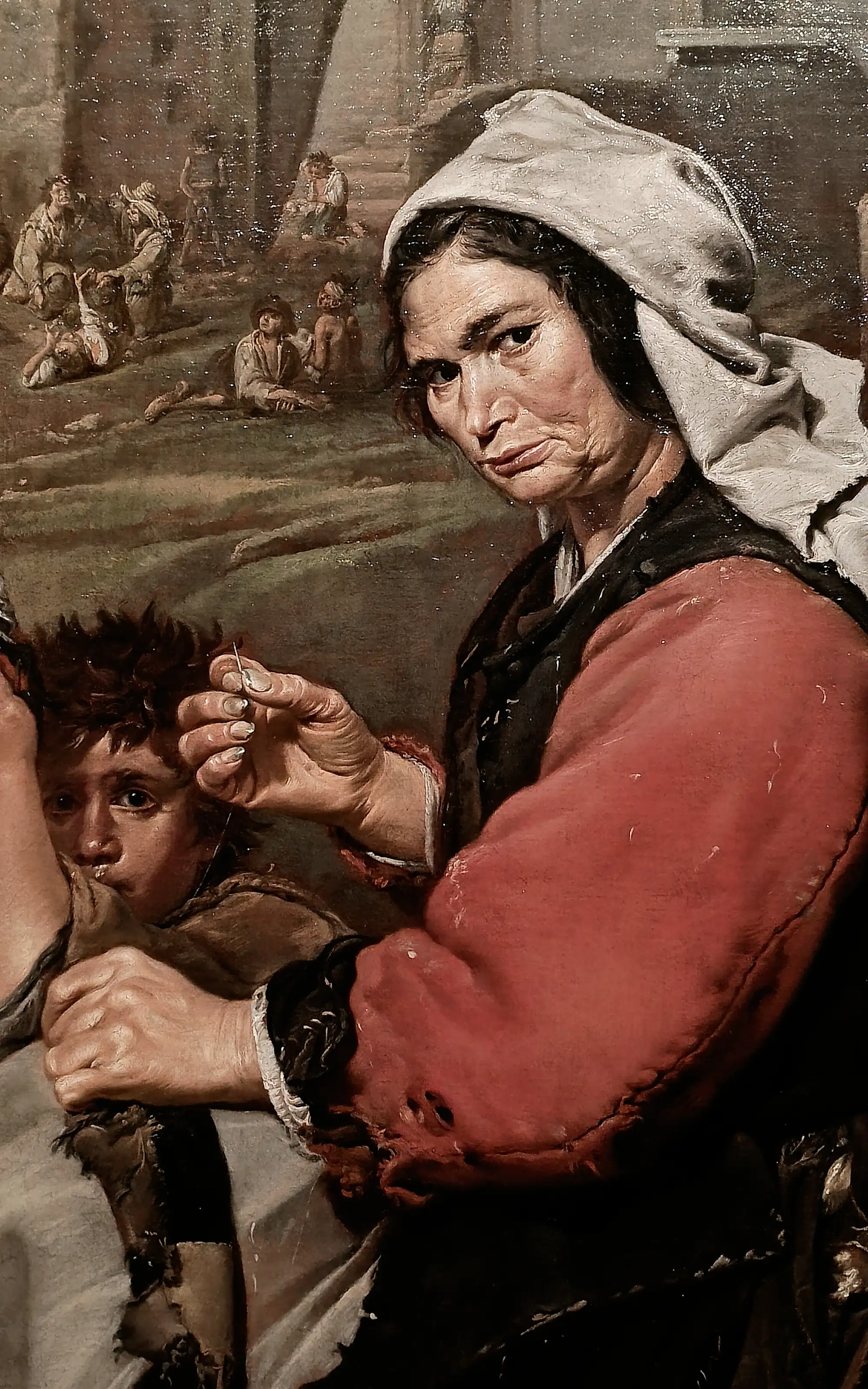
Detail of Peasants in the Open Air, 1685-1690, Galleria dell'Accademia, Venice

== Bibliography ==
- Bryan, Michael (1886). Robert Edmund Graves (ed.). Dictionary of Painters and Engravers, Biographical and Critical. Vol. I: A-K. London: George Bell and Sons. p. 108.
- Ticozzi, Stefano (1830). Dizionario degli architetti, scultori, pittori, intagliatori in rame ed in pietra, coniatori di medaglie, musaicisti, niellatori, intarsiatori d'ogni etá e d'ogni nazione' (Volume 1). Milan: Gaetano Schiepatti. p. 137.
