= Bartolomeo Ignazio Capello =

Italian painter

Bartolomeo Ignazio Capello (Borgo di Valsugana, Trento, Prince-Bishopric of Trent; 1689–1768) was an Italian painter in a late Baroque style.

He studied in Venice under Gregorio Lazzarini and Antonio Balestra; then travelled to Modena where he created copies of the work of Correggio. He was employed to paint for the Court of the Elector of Mainz; and in the Villa Giovanelli Colonna in Noventa Padovana, in Trento near Prato and Saracini; for the residence of Cardinal Schönborn in Speyer, and also for patrons in Salzburg.
