= Canosa (surname) =

Canosa is a surname. Notable people with the surname include:

- Erick Cañosa, Filipino politician and medical technologist
- Hans Canosa (born 1970), American film director, screenwriter, film editor, and producer
- Jorge Mas Canosa (1939–1997), Cuban-born American businessman
- Rodrigo Canosa (born 1988), Uruguayan footballer
