= Girolamo Forabosco =

Italian painter (1605–1679)

Girolamo Forabosco or Gerolamo Forabosco (1605 – 23 January 1679) was an Italian painter of the Baroque period.

He was active in Padua and his birthplace of Venice, where he was enrolled in the Venetian Fraglia dei Pittori between 1634 and 1639 and paid taxes in Venice from 1640 to 1644. He was a pupil of Alessandro Varotari (il Padovanino), and influenced in Venice by Bernardo Strozzi. Gregorio Lazzarini and Pietro Bellotto were among his pupils. He died in Padua.

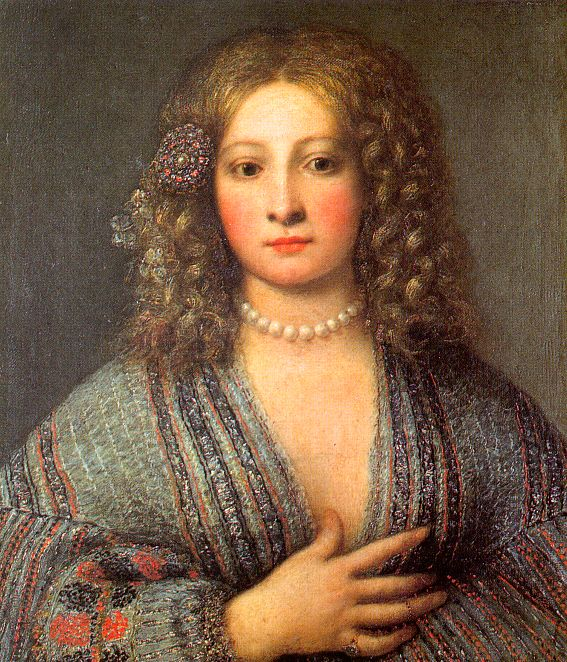
Girolamo Forabosco, Portrait of a Courtesan, Uffizi, Florence

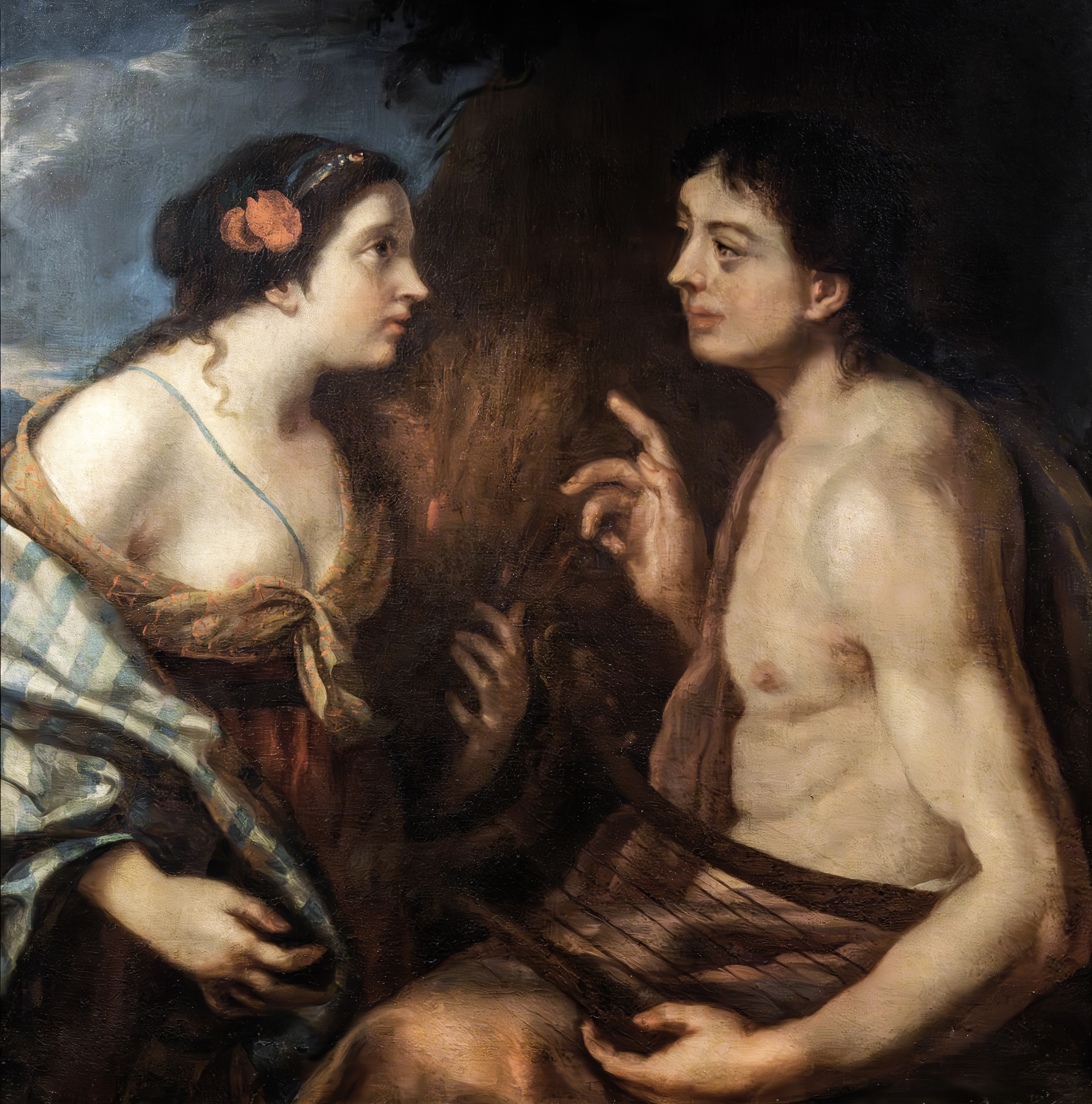
Apollo and the Cuman Sibyl, Pinacoteca Egidio Martini Venice

== Sources ==
- Web gallery of Art
- David with head of Goliath from Liechtenstein collection.
