= Jean Simeon Rousseau de la Rottière =

French painter (1747–1820)

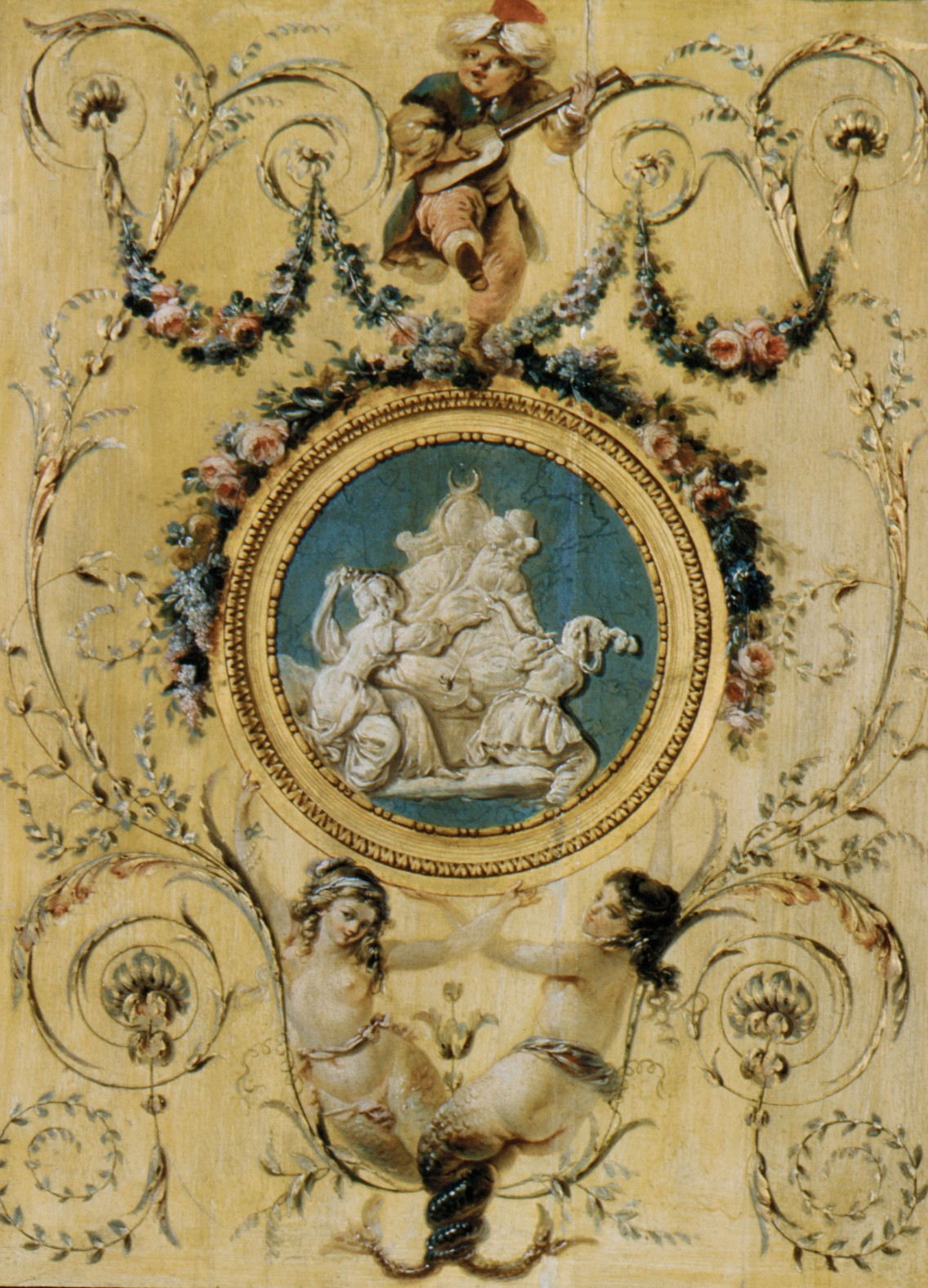
Door panel from the "Cabinet Turc" of Comte d'Artois at Versailles

Jean Simeon Rousseau de la Rottière (1747–1820) was a French decorative painter. He was the youngest son of Jules Antoine Rousseau (sculpteur du Roi). The territorial addition to his patronymic ("de la Rottiere") has never been explained, but it is known to have been in use when he was little more than a boy.

== Life and work ==
Jean Simeon studied at the Academie Royale, where in September 1768 he won the medal given to the best painter of the quarter. Together with his brother Jules Hugues, he was employed from an early date by his father for the decorative work executed by the family at the Palace of Versailles. There has been some controversy among the authorities as to the respective shares of father and son in these works, but many of the attributions are fairly determined by dates, Jules Antoine Rousseau having been at work at Versailles for years before the birth of his famous son.

The Bains du Roi, the Salon de la Méridienne, part of the bedchamber of Madame Adelaide, and the Garde-robe of King Louis XVI were among the achievements which there can be little doubt were shared in by Rousseau de la Rottière. His most individual and most famous undertaking was, however, the decoration of the Boudoir de Madame de Sévilly, now at the Victoria and Albert Museum. This little room, measuring 4 x 3 m and almost 5 m high, was removed from the house in the Rue de Saint Louis, in Le Marais. The Seigneur de Sévilly, who was hereditary Trésorier Général de l'Extraordinaire des Guerres under Louis XVI, married his cousin Anne Marie Louise de Pange, a favorite maid-of-honor of Marie Antoinette, and the story runs that Mme de Sévilly and the queen, wanting to give him a surprise, had the room decorated during his absence from Paris. It was purchased for the museum for 60,000 francs in 1869. The wall paintings of this sumptuous room came from the hand of Rousseau de la Rottière; the overdoor and part of the ceiling were executed by Lagrene le jeune; the architect was Ledoux; the grey marble figures of aged men on either side of the fireplace were sculptured by Clodion; the mounts of the chimneypiece are apparently from the chisel of Gouthire.

The date of the room is assigned to 1781-82, and Rousseau's authorship of much of its decoration is rendered certain by a sketch of his which still survives. The decoration was inspired to themes taken from the excavations of Pompeii. The tall narrow panels are painted in medallions with amorini; festoons and bouquets of flowers fill every available space; the shutters are painted with doves and shepherdesses. Lagrene's pictures in the upper lunettes represent the elements; upon the ceiling is Jupiter enthroned within a deep blue border. It is a melancholy reflection that M. de Sévilly, whom his wife and Marie Antoinette combined to surprise with this chefdoeuvre, was guillotined, and that his wife, whose sitting-room it was, was condemned to die with him and with Madame Élisabeth de France, whom they had befriended, but was saved, against her will, by the princess, who made a false declaration as to her condition. She had two subsequent husbands, and lost them both in little more than two years. She herself lived less than five years after her delivery by the fall of Maximilien Robespierre.
