= Tomas de Aguiar =

Spanish painter

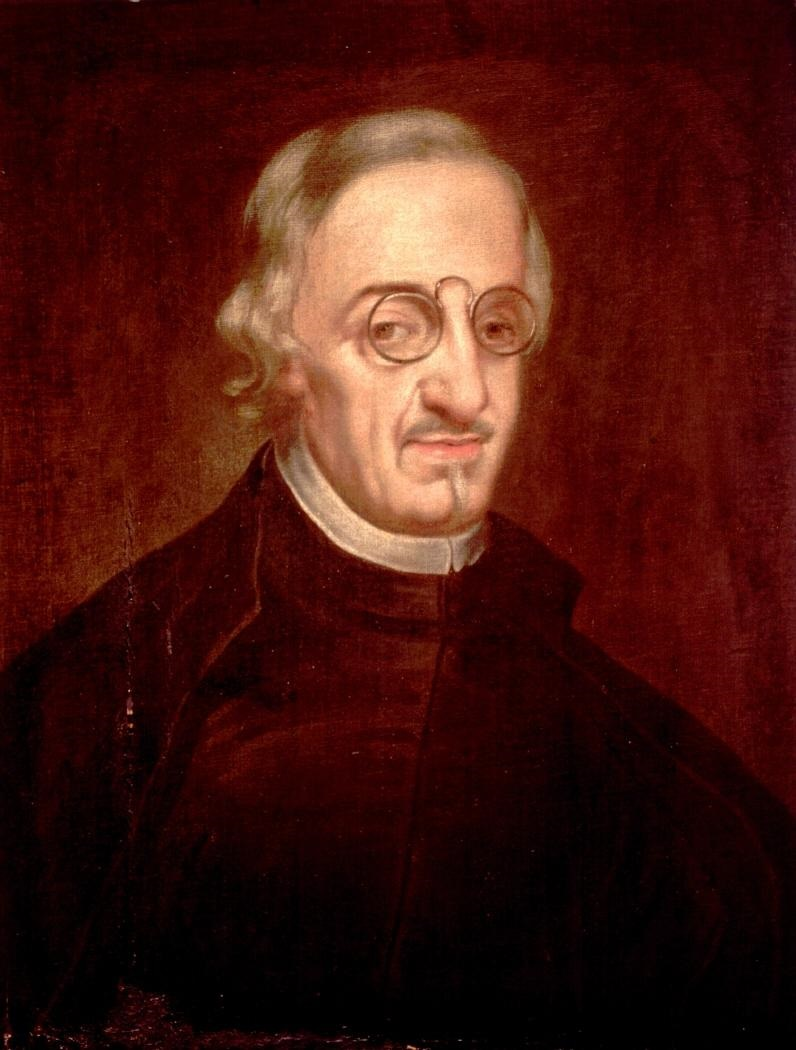
Antonio de Solis, traditionally attributed to Juan de Alfaro y Gamez and Tomás de Aguiar, Museum of Lázaro Galdiano, 1660

Tomás de Aguiar (died c. 1679) was a Spanish painter, active during the Baroque period. He was a pupil of Diego Velázquez, and known for painting portraits.

With little information about his life, the most accurate news is that provided by the 17th-century historian Lazaro Diaz del Valle, and a friend of Velasquez, which included Aguiar in his handwritten notes in the section dedicated to the "Spanish Lords and Noble Knights have been entertaining to paint and draw," where it said :

"lives in the service of the Lord Duke of Arcos 1657 this year. He is excellent at taking natural portraits."

Juan Agustín Ceán Bermúdez also praised Aguiar's skill in portraits, and noted that he painted "with great credit" for the 1660s. The poet Gabriel Bocángel wrote in 1653 "D. Thomas de Aguiar, who in the elegance of his numbers deserved testifies to the opinion of his own", which would confirm the origin of Aguiar as a gentleman with good education.

The existence of some kind of relationship with Velasquez is further confirmed by the inventory of goods left at his death and his wife Juana Pacheco, inventory conducted by Juan Bautista Martínez del Mazo in August 1660, where an item designated as number 166 was collected, presumably a portrait painted by Velázquez and now lost, described as "another cabeça (head) of Don Tomás de Aguiar".

Playwright and historian Antonio de Solís y Ribadeneyra, wrote "Don Tomás de Aguiar, a distinguished painter, and great Courtier", and dedicated a sonnet dedicated to him in response to Aguiar's painting a portrait of him:

Artificioso estilo, que regido
Discurres de ese Espíritu elegante,
Como imitas el Alma en mi semblante,
Y das tanta verdad a lo fingido?
Es acaso ese bronce colorido
Cristal, que buelve Idea semejante?
Pero no, que más cierto, y más constante
Das razón, y evidencias al sentido.
Tan vivo me traslada, o representa
Ese parto gentil de tu cuidado,
Que yo apenas, de mi le diferencio.
Y si la voz le falta, es por que intenta,
Al verme en su primor arrebatado,
Copiar mi admiración con su silencio.

Aguiar died in Madrid, Spain in 1679.
