= Giuseppe Dallamano =

Italian painter (1679–1758)

Giuseppe Dallamano (1679–1758) was an Italian painter of the late-Baroque period. Born in Modena, he was active in painting quadratura in Turin.
