= Elias Baeck =

German painter and engraver

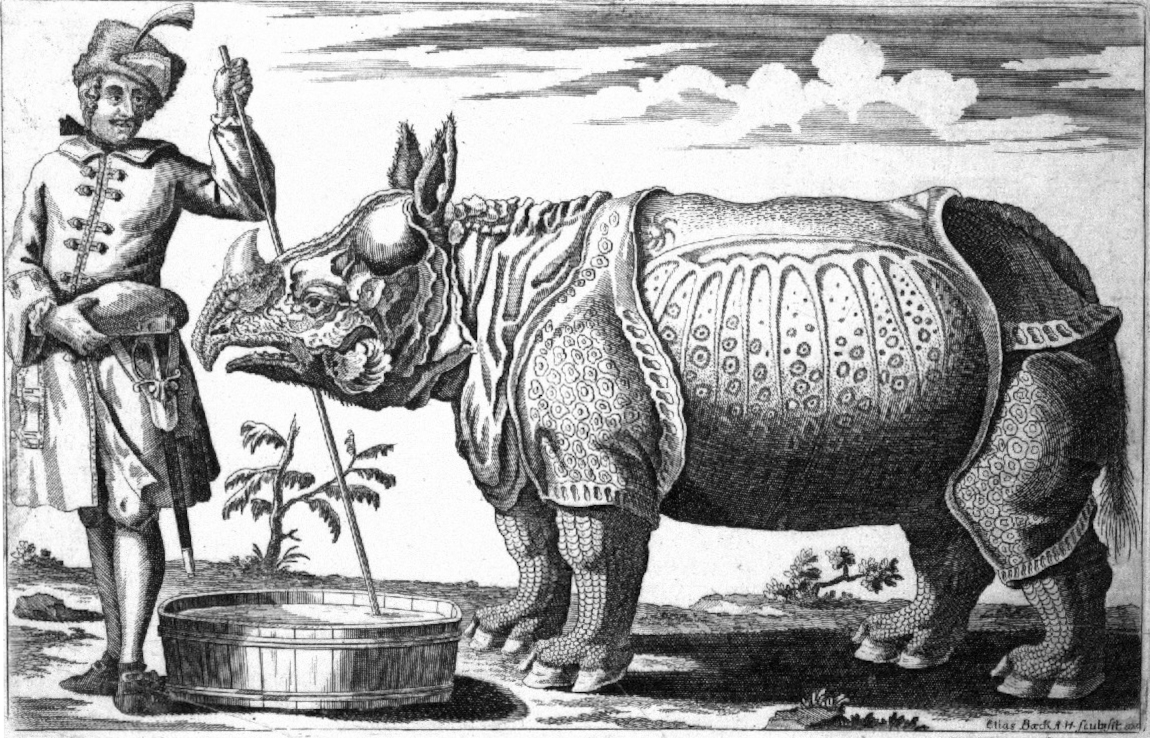
Clara, engraving from 1746.

Elias Baeck (1679–1747) called "Heldenmuth", was a German painter and engraver from Augsburg.

== Life ==
Baeck worked for some time in Rome, then in Laybach, but finally returned to Augsburg, where he died in 1747. His chief works — both in painting and engraving — were portraits and landscapes. His engravings are sometimes signed "E.B.a.H.", standing for "Elias Baeck, alias Heldenmuth".
