= Giovanni Battista Canossa =

Giovanni Battista Canossa (died 1747) was an Italian wood engraver.

He was born and died in Bologna, Papal States. This is also where he trained with Giovanni Maria Viani. He spent his whole career in the city.
