= 1858 in art =

Events from the year 1858 in art.

== Events ==
- January 3 – English writer and art critic John Ruskin meets 10-year-old Rose La Touche, a drawing pupil who becomes his muse, for the first time, at her family's London home.
- May 3 – The Royal Academy Exhibition of 1858 opens at the National Gallery in London
- May 13 – John Ruskin begins a tour of Europe which he considers a significant turning point in his life.
- English-born photographer Robert Jefferson Bingham creates the first photographic catalogue raisonné, depicting the works of French painter Paul Delaroche (d. 1856) (Oeuvre de Paul Delaroche, reproduit en photographie par Bingham, accompagné d'une notice sur la vie et les oeuvres de Paul Delaroche), published by Goupil & Cie in Paris. Goupil also begins publication of mass editions of photographic reproductions of popular paintings.
- Edward Lear visits the Holy Land.

== Awards ==
- Prix de Rome (for painting) – Jean-Jacques Henner

== Works ==
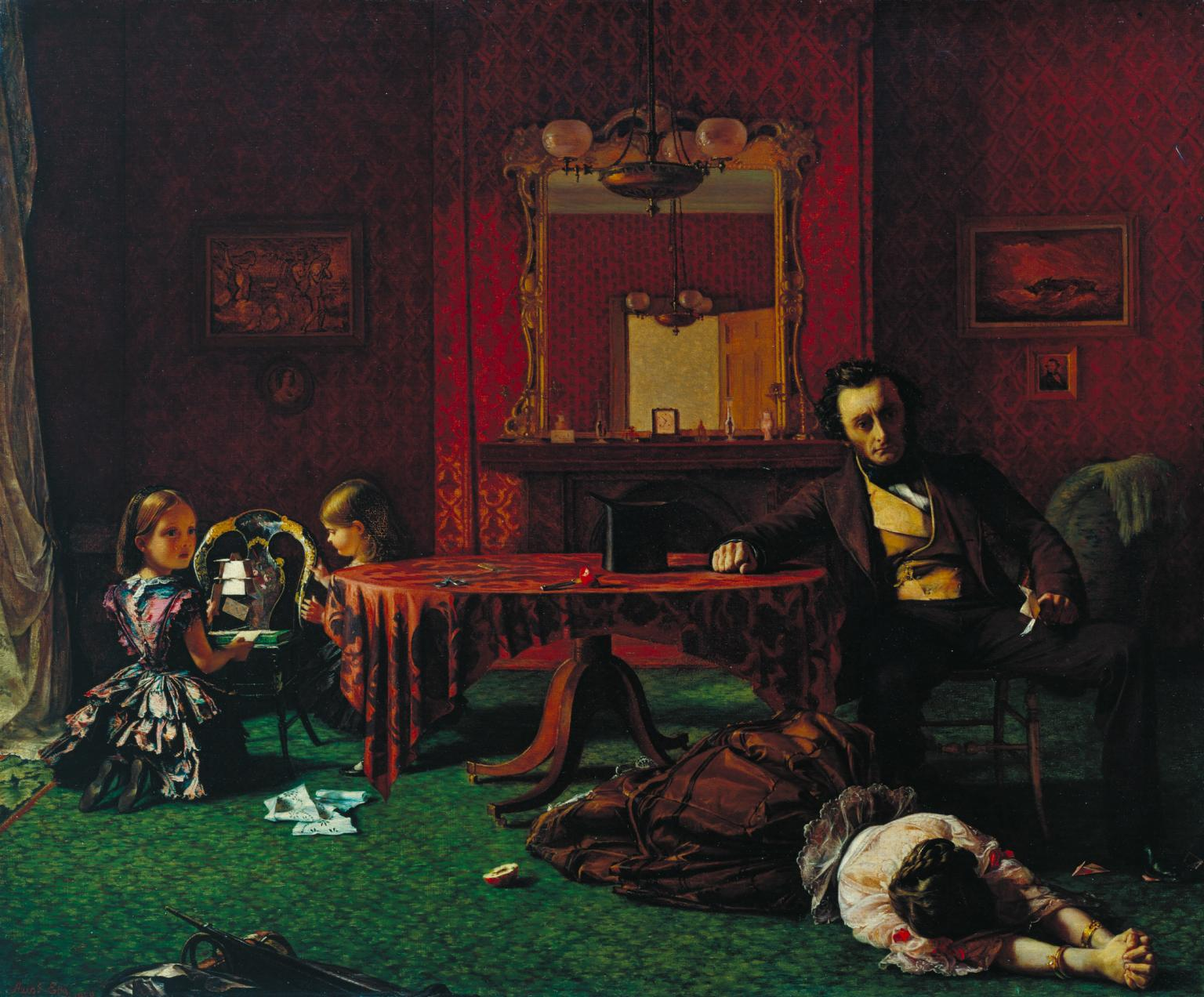
Misfortune from Augustus Egg's Past and Present

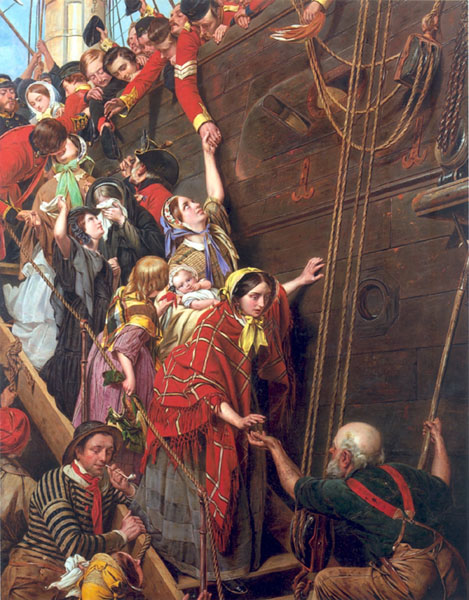
Eastward Ho! by Henry Nelson O'Neil.

- Ivan Aivazovsky – The Battle of Bomarsund
- Edward Armitage – Retribution
- Jerry Barrett – The Mission of Mercy: Nightingale receiving the wounded at Scutari
- Emma Brownlow – The Foundling Restored to its Mother
- Philip Hermogenes Calderon – Ave Maria
- 'Lewis Carroll' – Alice Liddell as a beggar child (photograph)
- Augustus Egg – Past and Present (triptych)
- William Henry Fisk – The Secret
- William Powell Frith
  - The Derby Day
  - The Crossing Sweeper
  - The Signal
- Jean Auguste Dominique Ingres – Self-Portrait at the Age of 78 (Uffizi Gallery, Florence)
- Christian Albrecht Jensen – Andreas Gottlob Rudelbach
- Édouard Manet – The Boy with Cherries (Museu Calouste Gulbenkian, Lisbon)
- William Morris – La belle Iseult
- Elisabet Ney – Jacob Grimm (sculpture)
- John Phillip – The Dying Contrabandista
- Henry Nelson O'Neil – Eastward Ho!
- John Quidor – The Headless Horseman Pursuing Ichabod Crane
- David Roberts
  - Edinburgh from the Calton Hill
  - The interior of the Collegiate Church of St Paul at Antwerp
- Rebecca Solomon – Behind the Curtain
- Clarkson Stanfield – On the Coast of Brittany
- Edward Washburn – The Arkansas Traveller
- Albert Wolff – Löwenkämpfer (equestrian bronze, Berlin, Germany)

== Births ==
- January 6 – Albert Henry Munsell, American painter, teacher of art and inventor of the Munsell color system (died 1918)
- January 10 – Heinrich Zille, German photographer and illustrator (died 1929)
- March 13 – Maximilien Luce, French Neo-Impressionist painter (died 1941)
- May 14 – Anthon van Rappard, Dutch painter (died 1892)
- June 16 – John Russell, Australian Impressionist painter (died 1930)
- June 21 – Medardo Rosso, Italian Post-Impressionist sculptor (died 1928)
- September 12 – Fernand Khnopff, Belgian Symbolist painter (died 1921)
- November 2 – Niels Skovgaard, Danish sculptor and painter (died 1938)
- November 12 – Marie Bashkirtseff, Ukrainian-born painter (died 1884)
- November 30 – Rosa Mayreder, Austrian freethinker, author, painter, musician and feminist (died 1938)

== Deaths ==
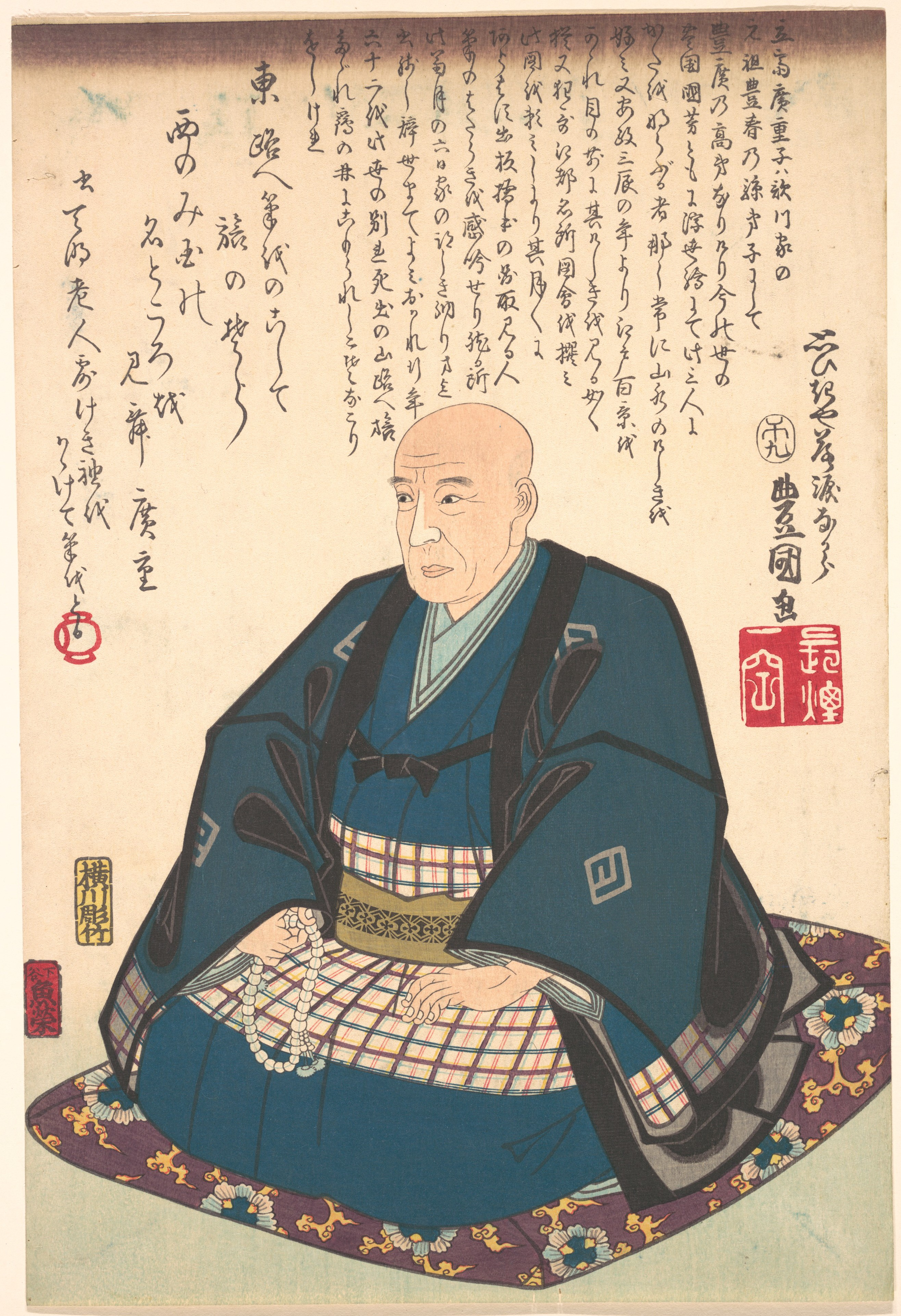
Memorial portrait of Hiroshige by Kunisada

- January 10 – Hezekiah Augur, American sculptor and inventor (born 1791)
- January 31 – Václav Mánes, Czech painter (born 1793)
- April 9 – Joseph Stieler, German painter (born 1781)
- May 18 – Carl Gustaf Löwenhielm, Swedish diplomat who made paintings of the countries in which he served (born 1790)
- June 15 – Ary Scheffer, painter (born 1795)
- July 15 – Alexander Andreyevich Ivanov, Russian painter who adhered to Neoclassicism (born 1806)
- October 12 – Hiroshige, Japanese ukiyo-e artist (born 1797)
- October 16 – Charles Norris, English topographical etcher and writer known for his landscape work of the Welsh countryside (born 1779)
- date unknown
  - Guillaume Descamps, French painter and engraver (born 1779)
  - John Hogan, sculptor (born 1800)
