= The Clique (art group) =

Group of English artists formed in the 1830s

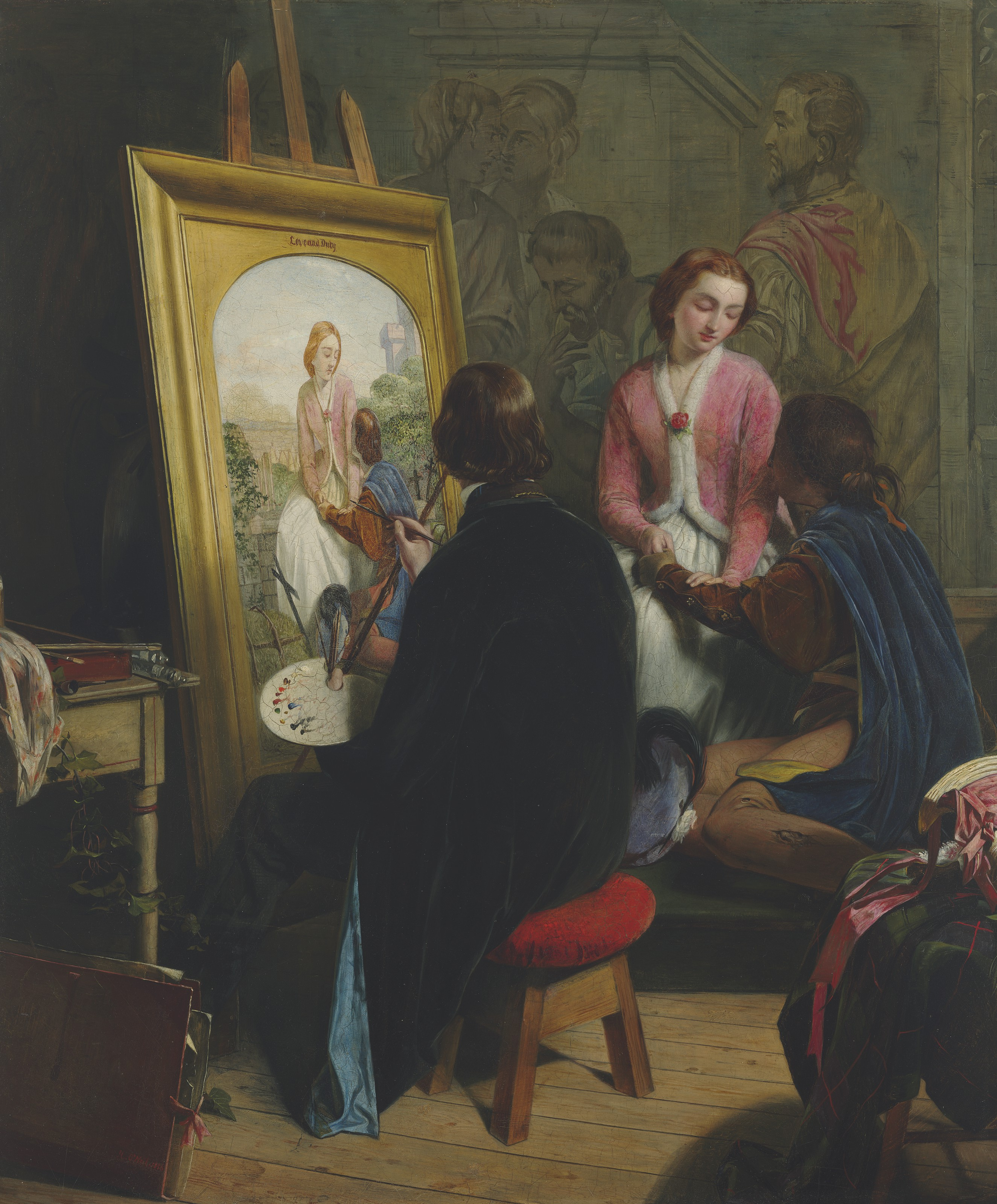
The Pre-Raphaelite, a satire on the Pre-Raphaelites painted by Henry Nelson O'Neil in 1856

The Clique was a group of English artists formed by Richard Dadd in the late 1830s. Other members were Augustus Egg, Alfred Elmore, William Powell Frith, Henry Nelson O'Neil, John Phillip and Edward Matthew Ward.

They have been described as "the first group of British artists to combine for greater strength and to announce that the great backward-looking tradition of the Academy was not relevant to the requirements of contemporary art."

== Foundation ==
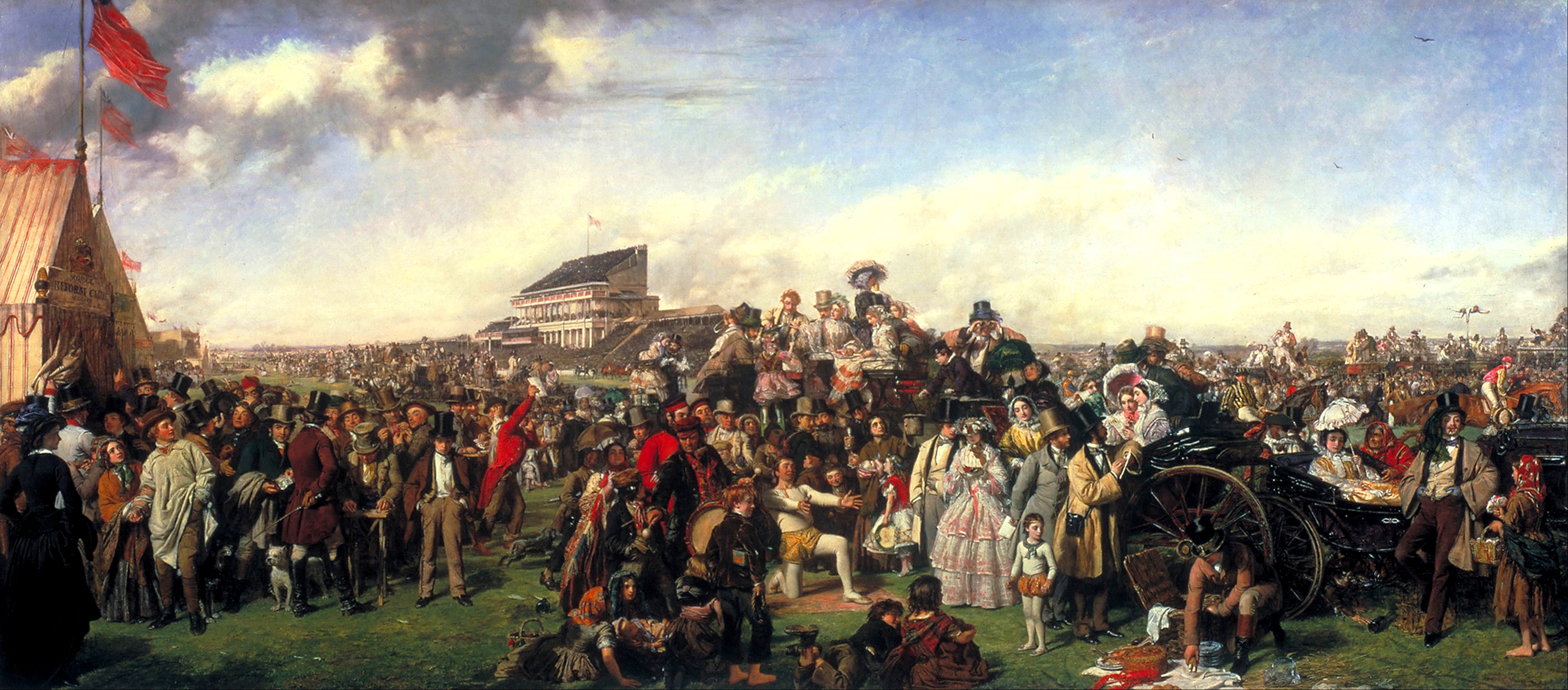
The Derby Day by William Powell Frith.

Information about the activities of The Clique derives mainly from the reminiscences of Frith and a short essay published in The Art Journal in 1898 by Gilbert Imray, a friend of the group. Both state that the group called themselves by this name at the time and that they formed a sketching club. Imray describes the aspirations of some members and explains that at their meetings they would all produce drawings on the same subject and ask non-artists such as Imray to judge the merits of the works.

They met together at the end of the 1830s and early 1840s. The group broke up in 1843 when Dadd was incarcerated after murdering his father. The others all became successful members of the Royal Academy of Arts (though O'Neil only became an associate member, not a full member). Their work was supported by the newly founded periodical The Art Journal.

== Ideas ==
The Clique was characterised by their rejection of academic high art in favour of genre painting, following the precedents of William Hogarth and David Wilkie. This was in line with their view that art should be judged by the public, not by its conformity to academic ideals.

In the 1850s most members of the Clique became inveterate enemies of the Pre-Raphaelite Brotherhood, believing their art to be willfully eccentric and primitivist. Frith and O'Neil wrote many attacks on Pre-Raphaelite principles. However Egg became a friend and supporter of William Holman Hunt.

Portraits of members of the Clique were commissioned by Patrick Allan-Fraser for Hospitalfield House in Arbroath.

In the 1860s another group of artists with similar ideas became known as the St. John's Wood Clique.

== Gallery ==
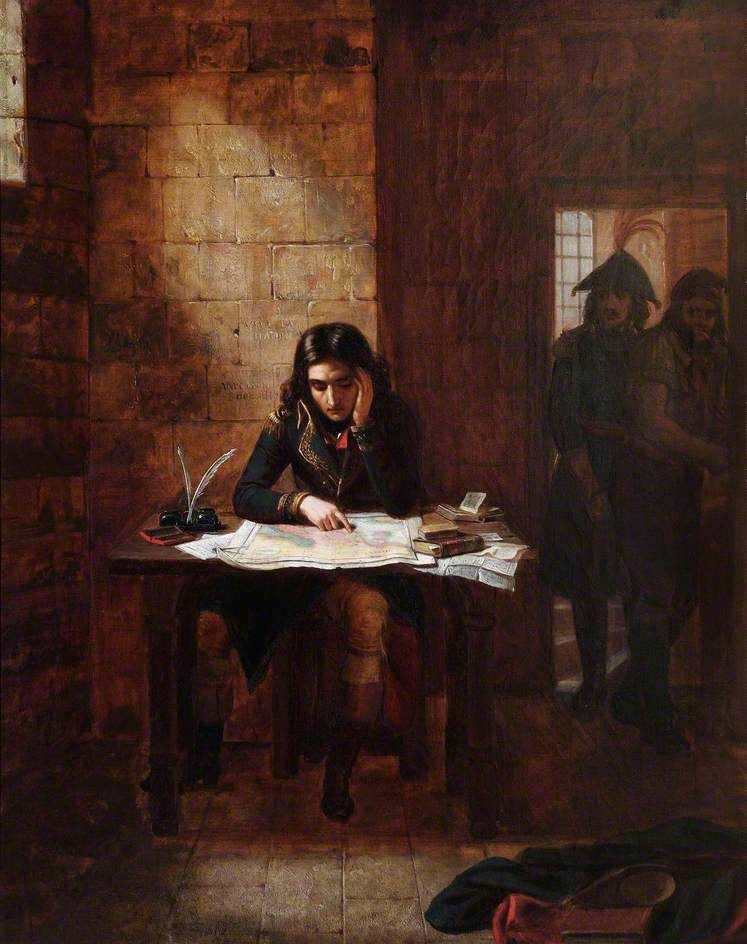
Napoleon in the Prison of Nice in 1794 by Edward Matthew Ward, 1841

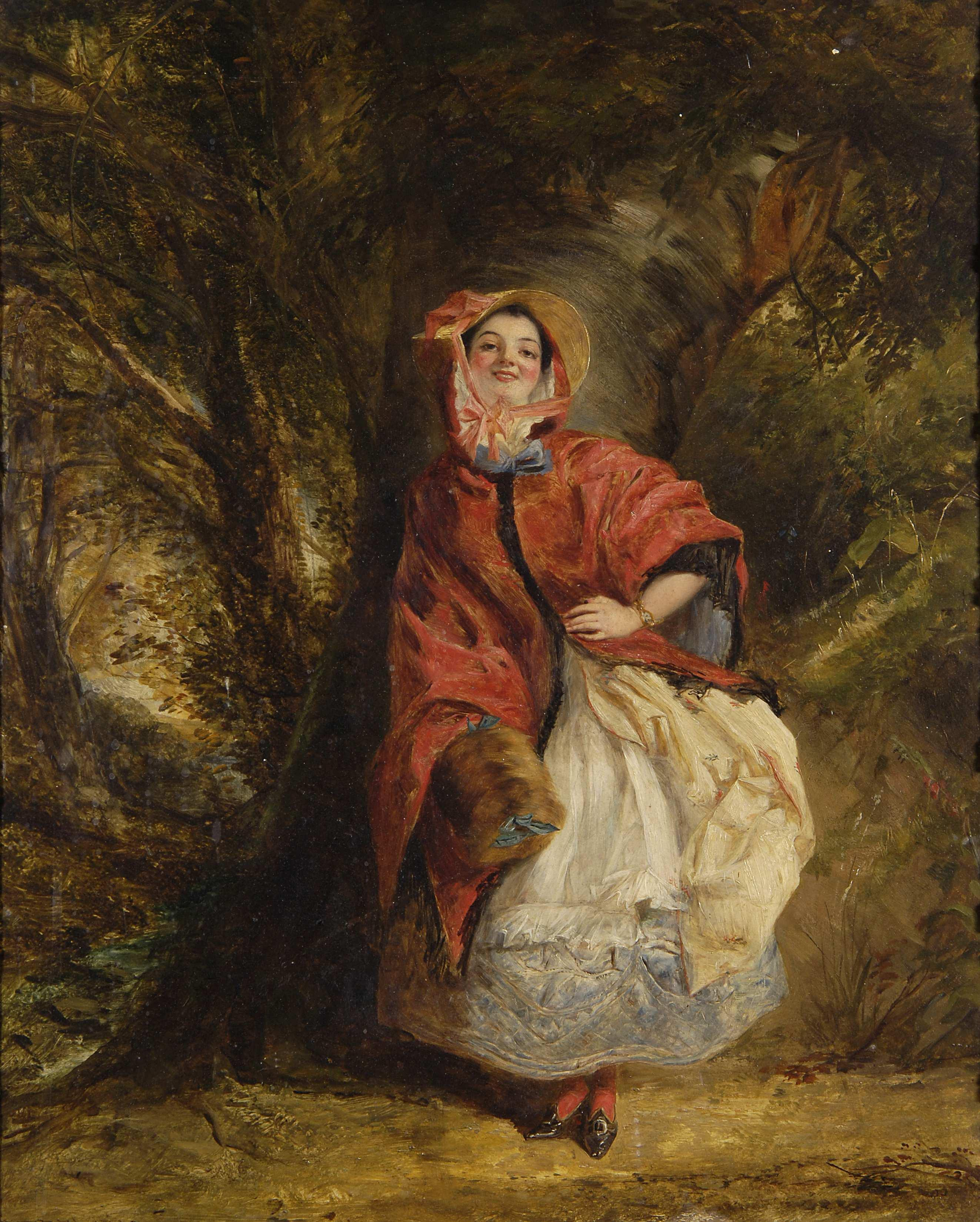
Dolly Varden by William Powell Frith, 1842

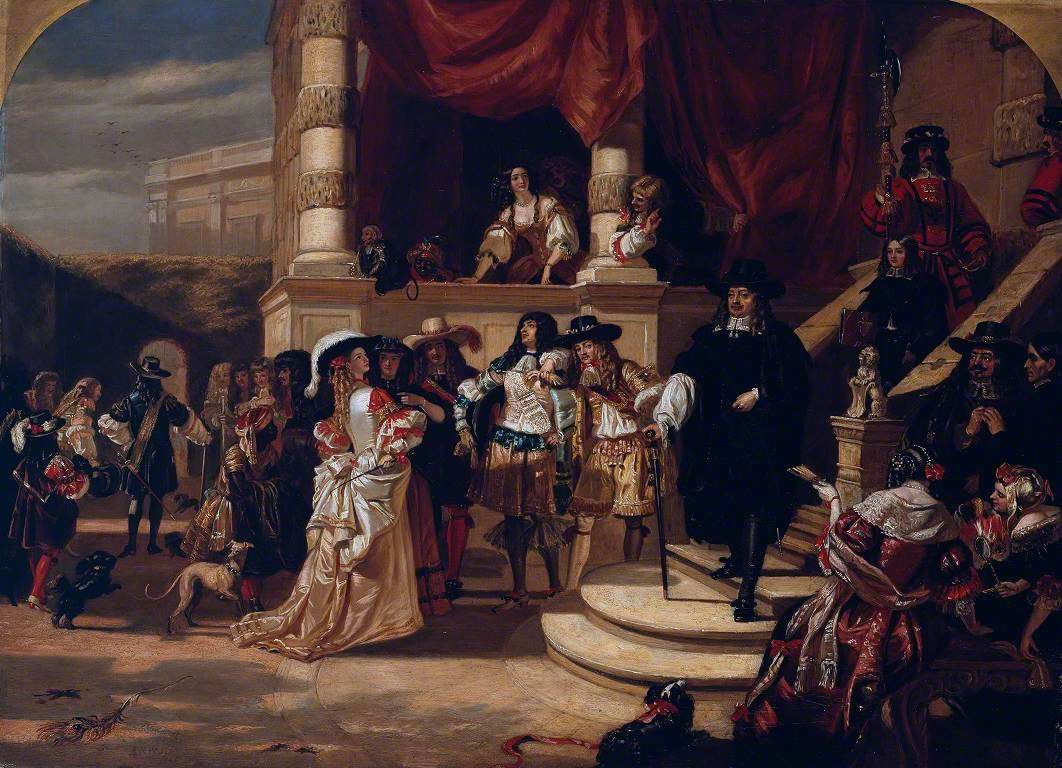
The Disgrace of Lord Clarendon by Edward Matthew Ward, 1846

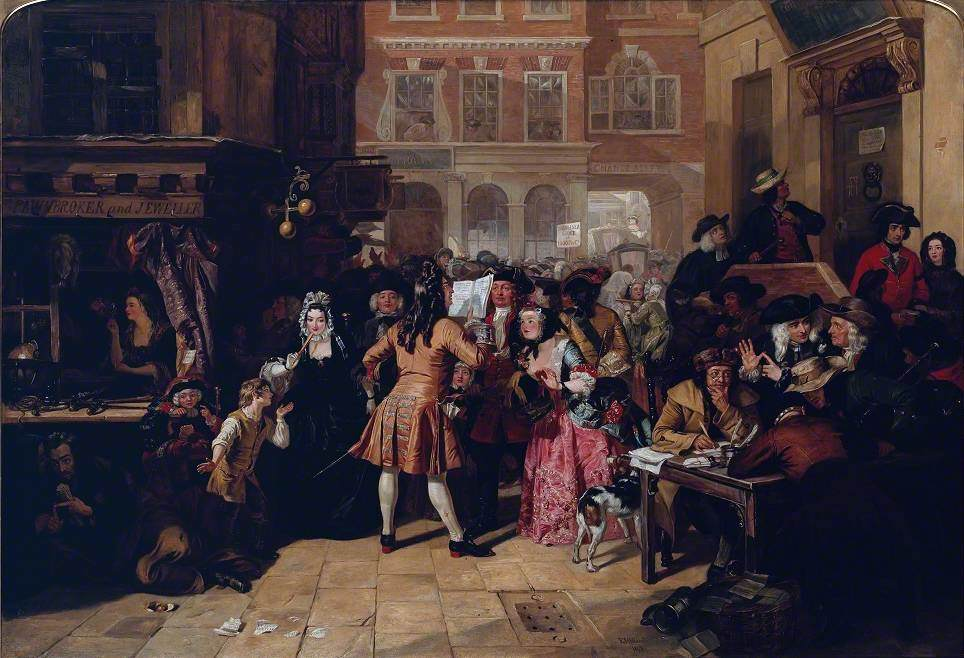
The South Sea Bubble by Edward Matthew Ward, 1847

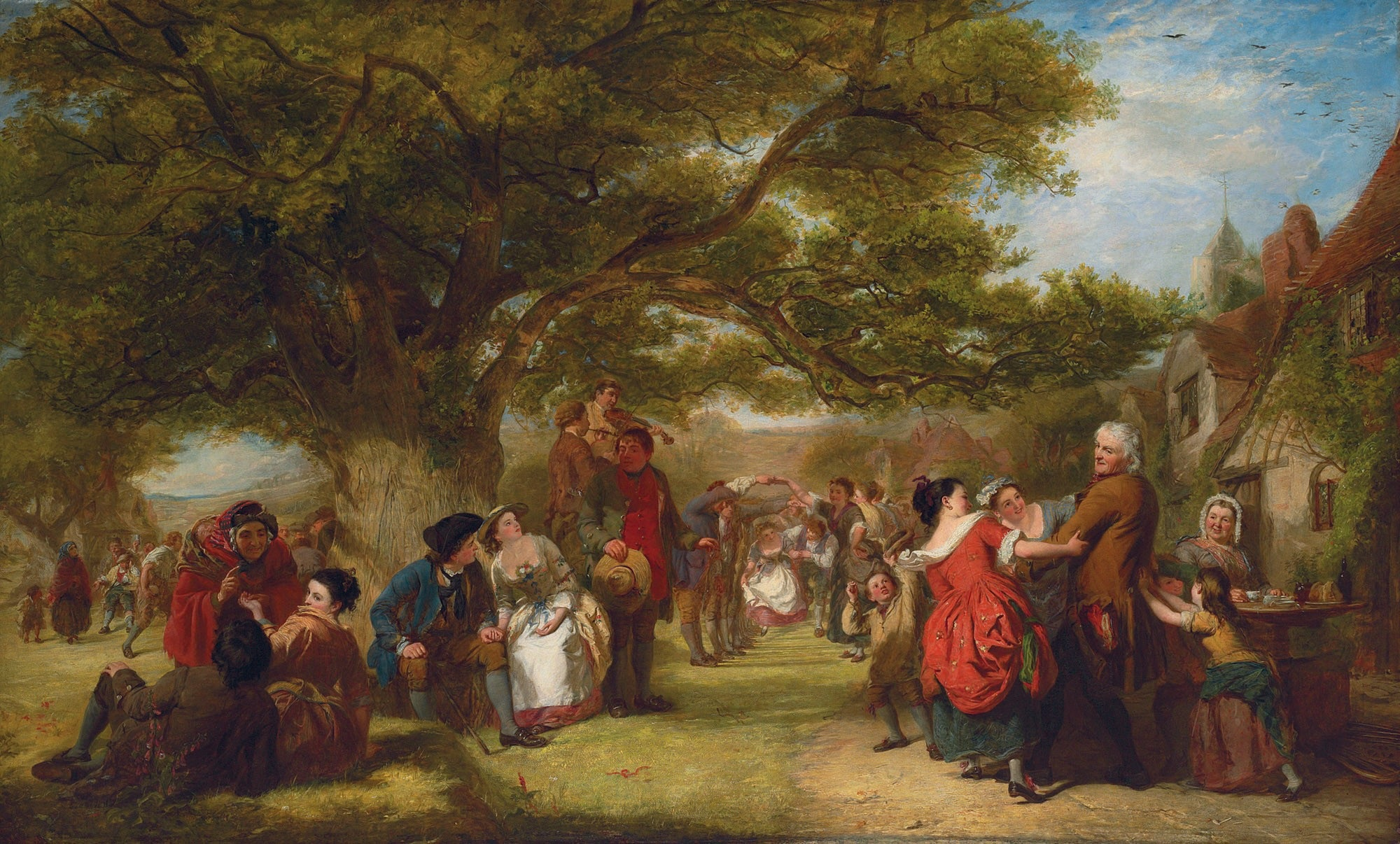
An English Merrymaking a Hundred Years Ago by William Powell Frith, 1847

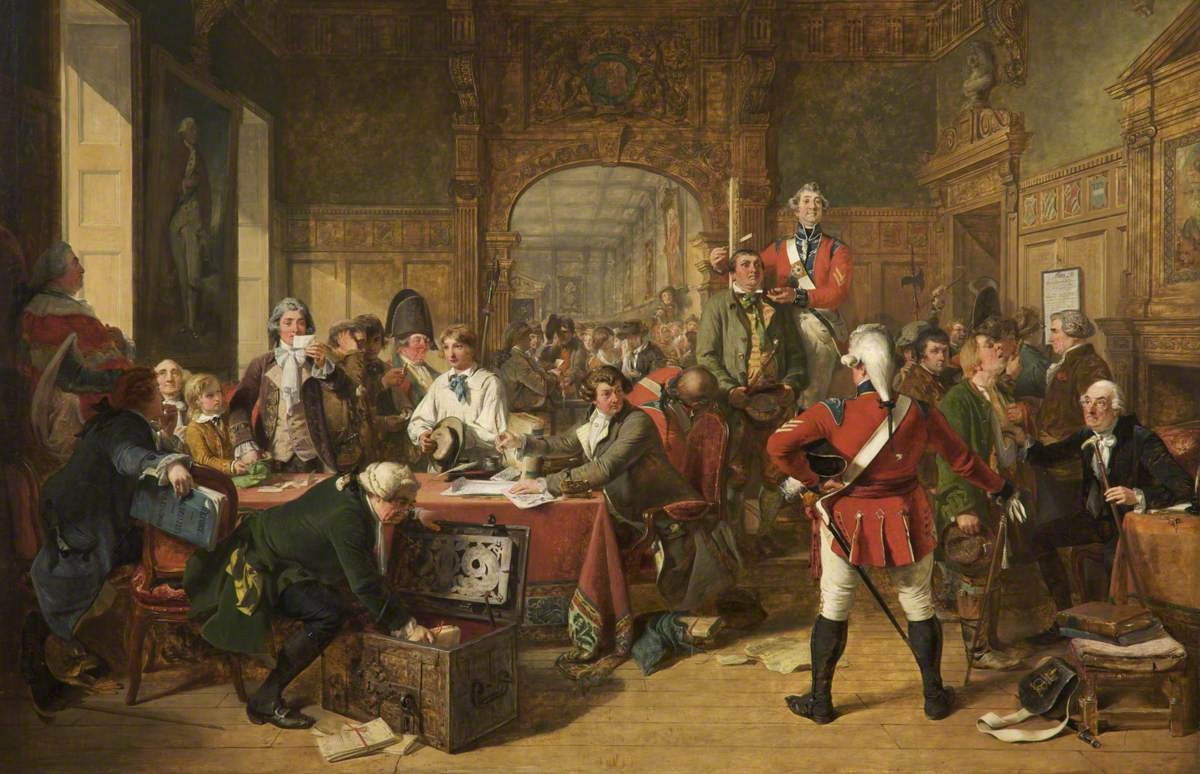
Drawing for the Militia by John Phillip, 1849

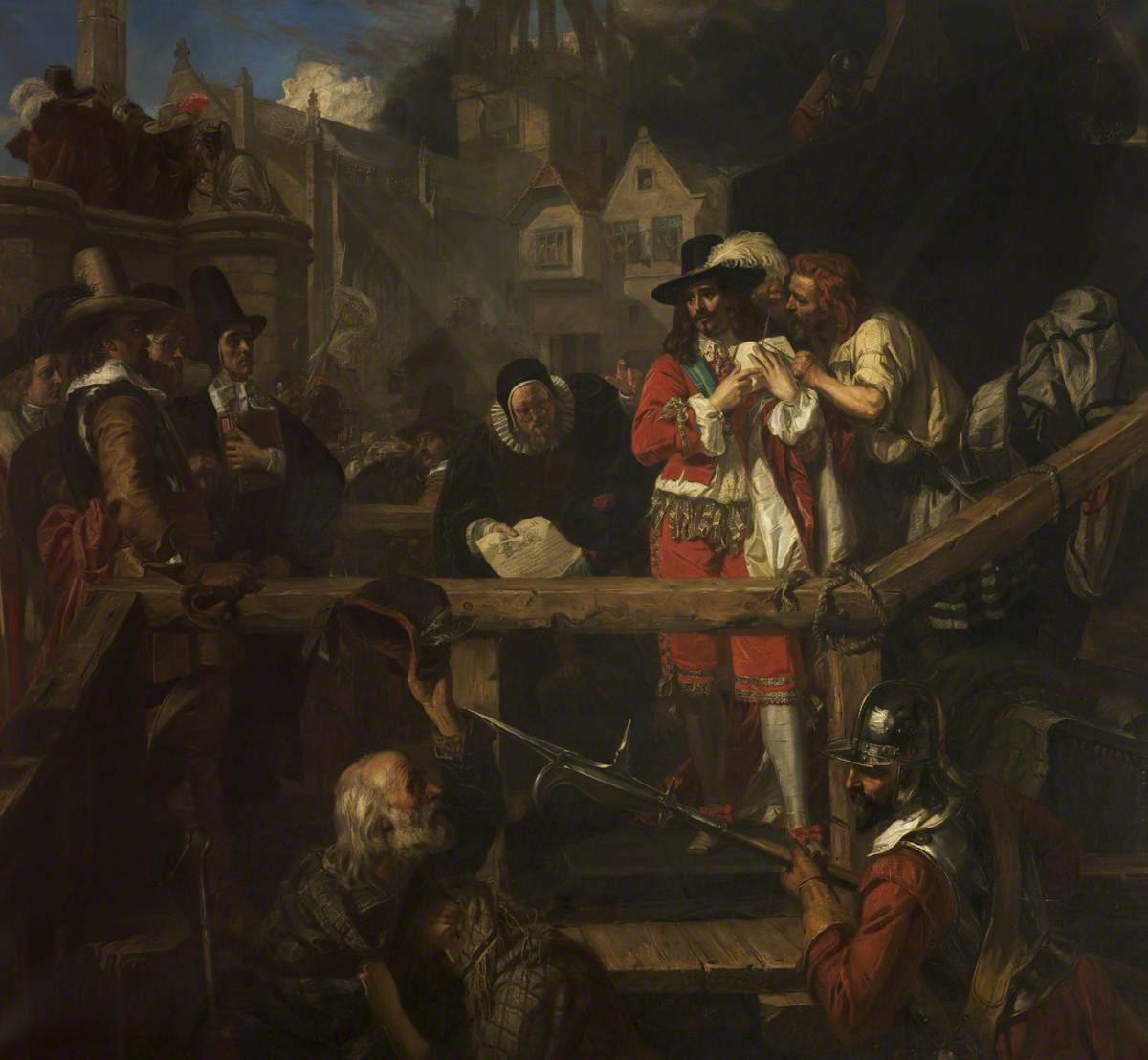
The Execution of the Marquis of Montrose by Edward Matthew Ward, 1853

Josephine Signing the Act of Her Divorce by Edward Matthew Ward, 1853

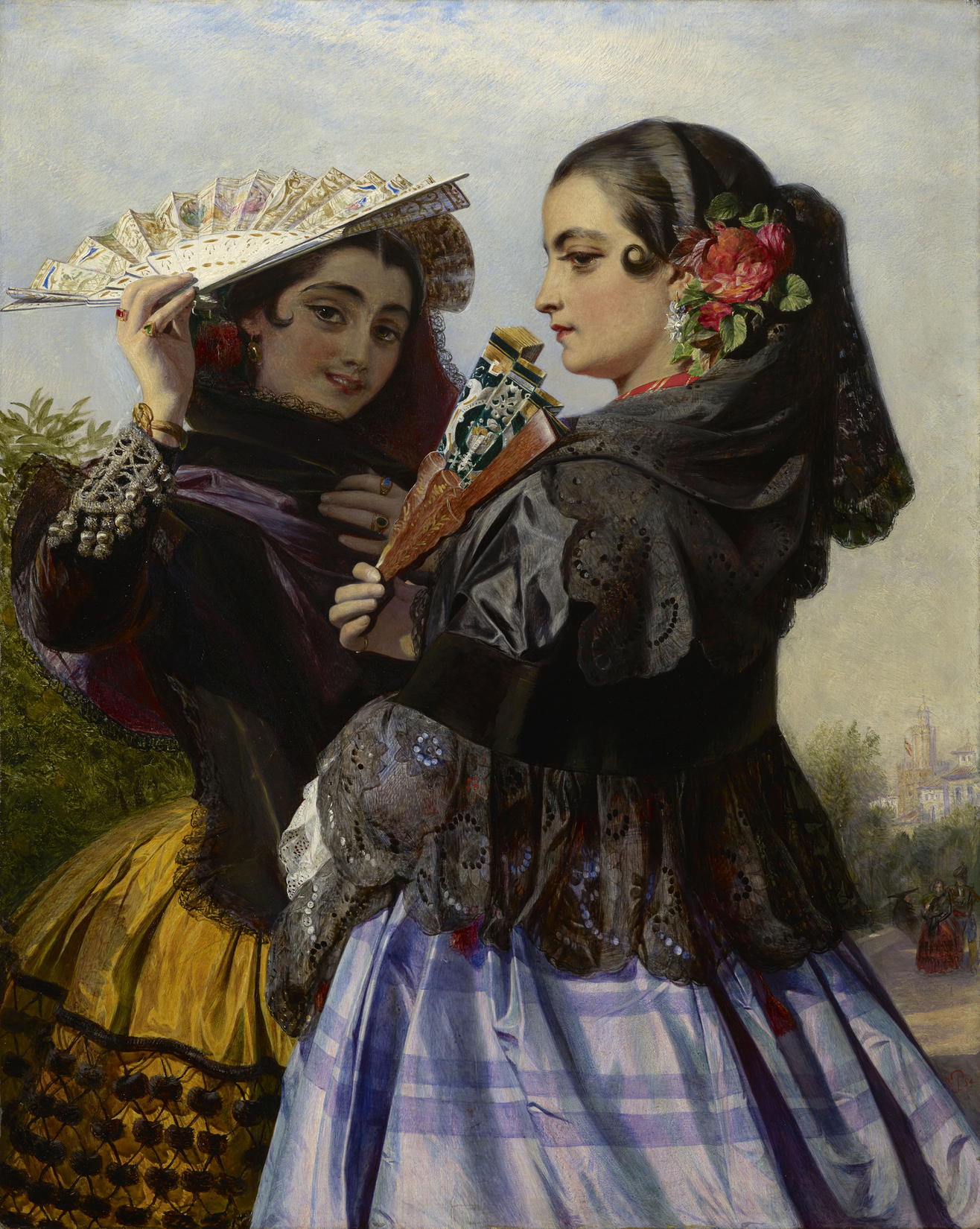
El Paseo by John Phillip, 1854

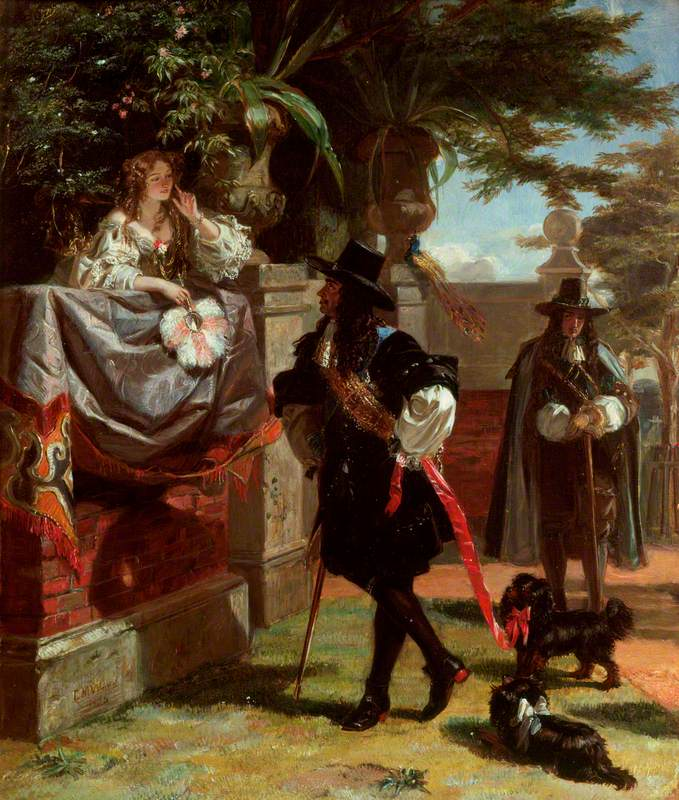
Charles II and Nell Gwyn by Edward Matthew Ward, 1854

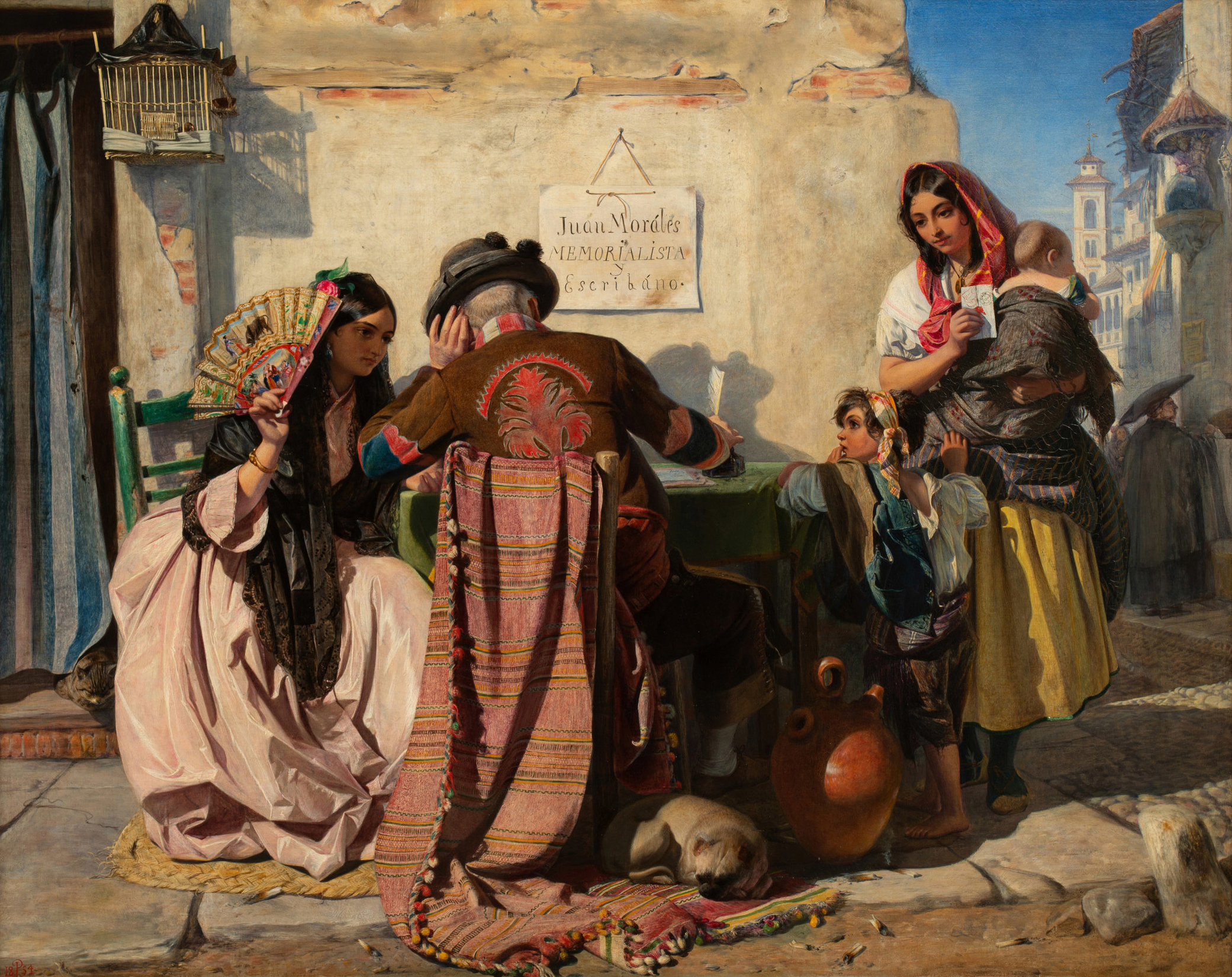
The Letter-Writer of Seville by John Phillip, 1854

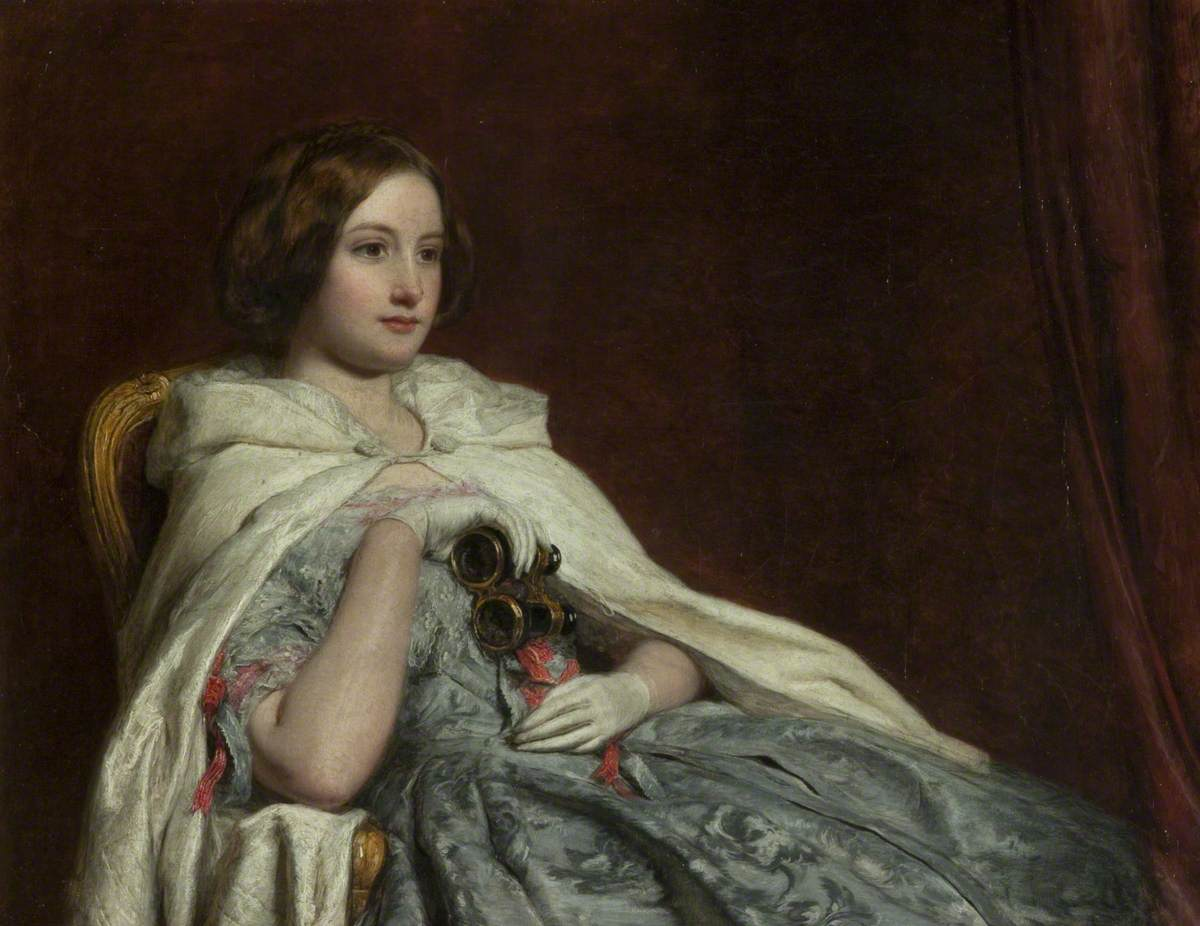
At the Opera by William Powell Frith, 1855

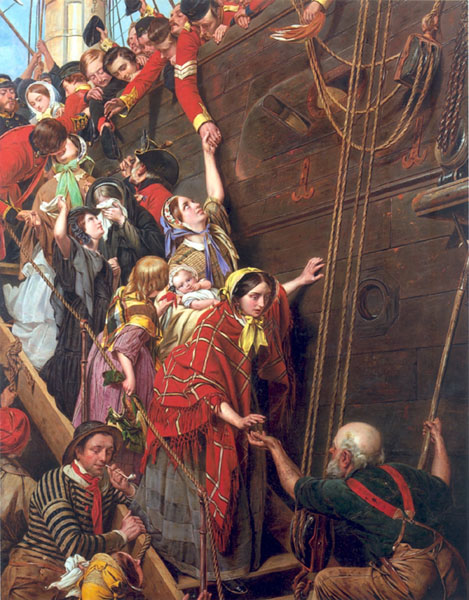
Eastward Ho! by Henry Nelson O'Neil, 1858

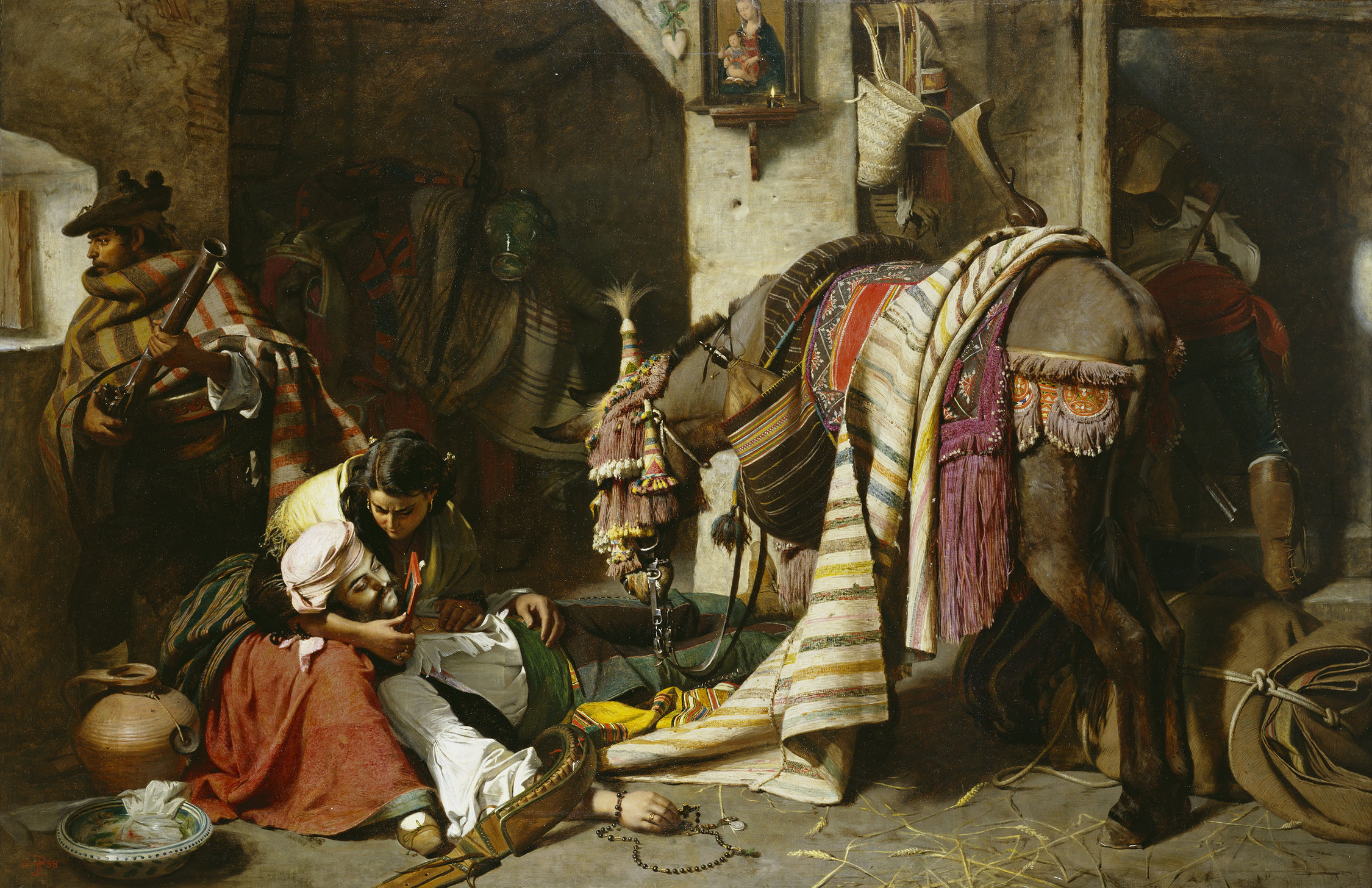
The Dying Contrabandista by John Phillip, 1858

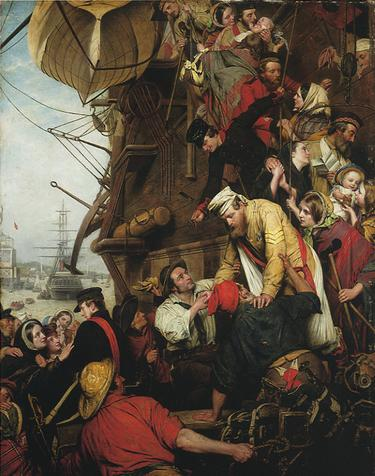
Home Again, by Henry Nelson O'Neil, 1859

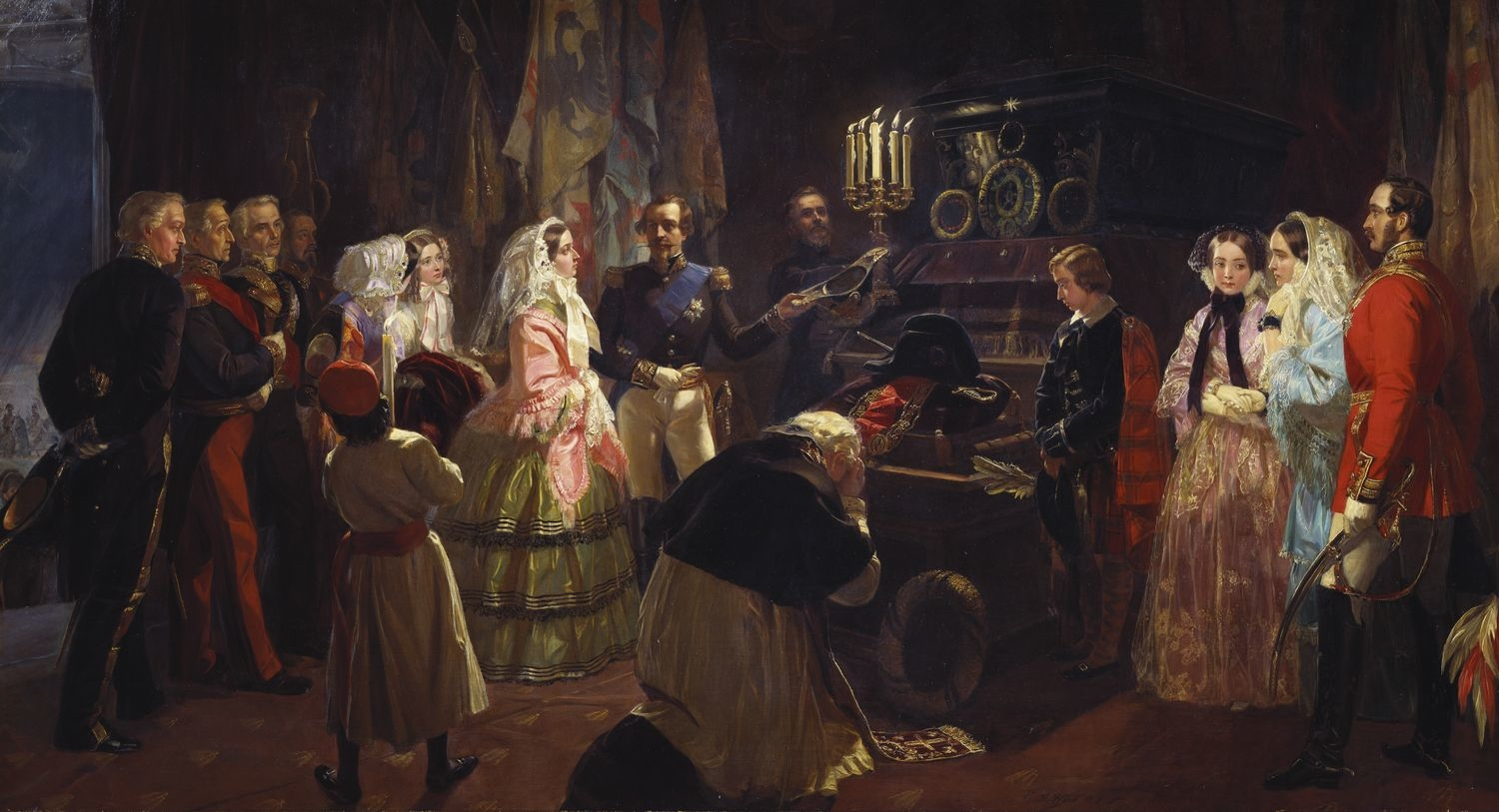
Queen Victoria at the Tomb of Napoleon by Edward Matthew Ward, 1860

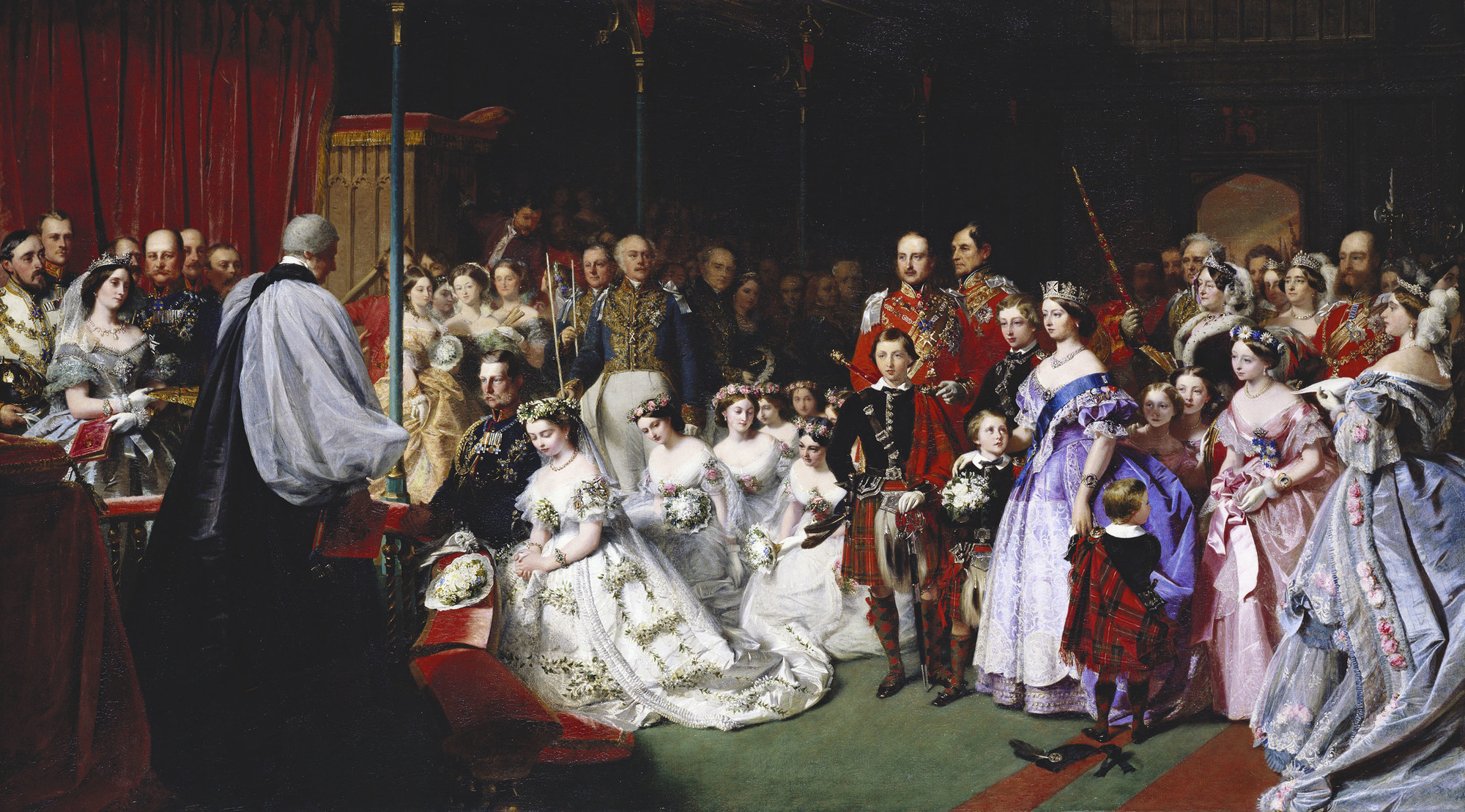
The Marriage of Victoria, Princess Royal by John Phillip, 1860

A Volunteer by Henry Nelson O'Neil, 1860

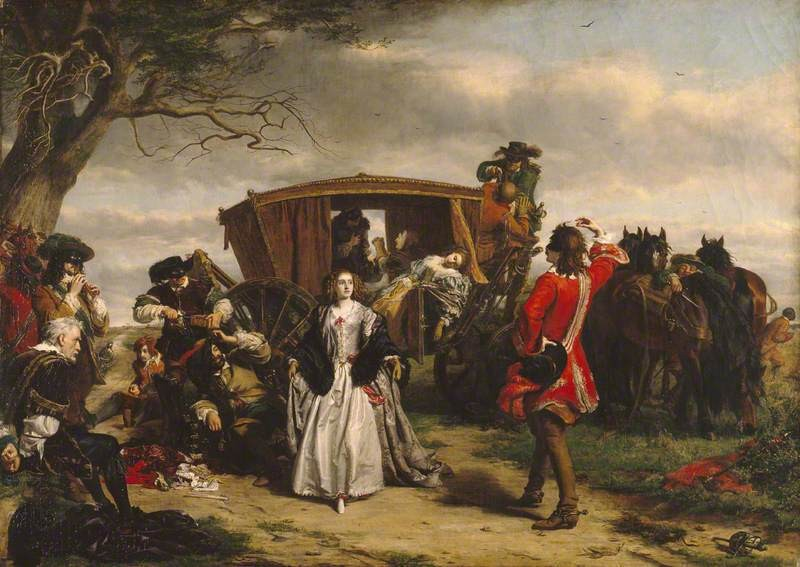
Claude Duval by William Powell Frith, 1860

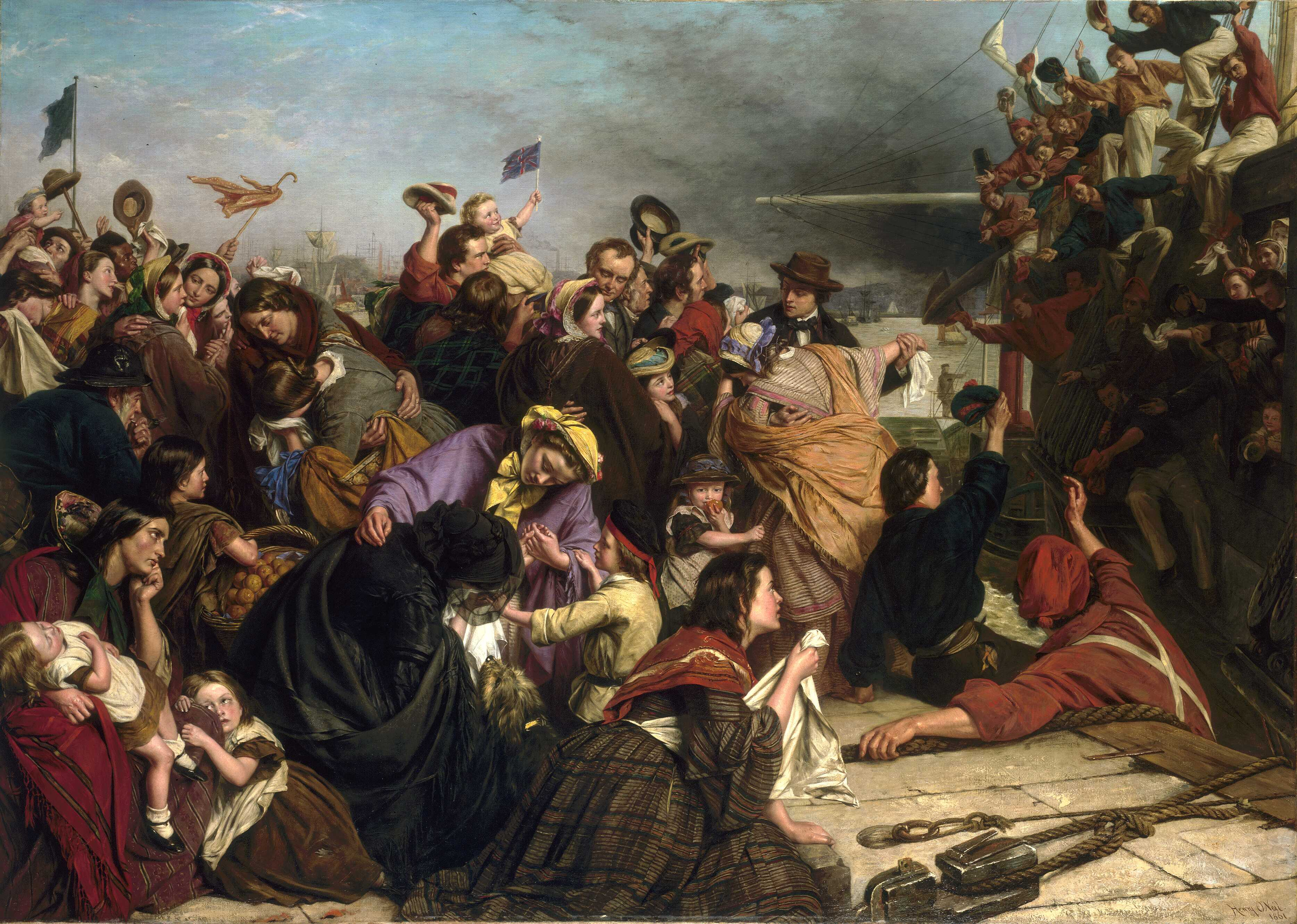
The Parting Cheer by Henry Nelson O'Neil, 1861

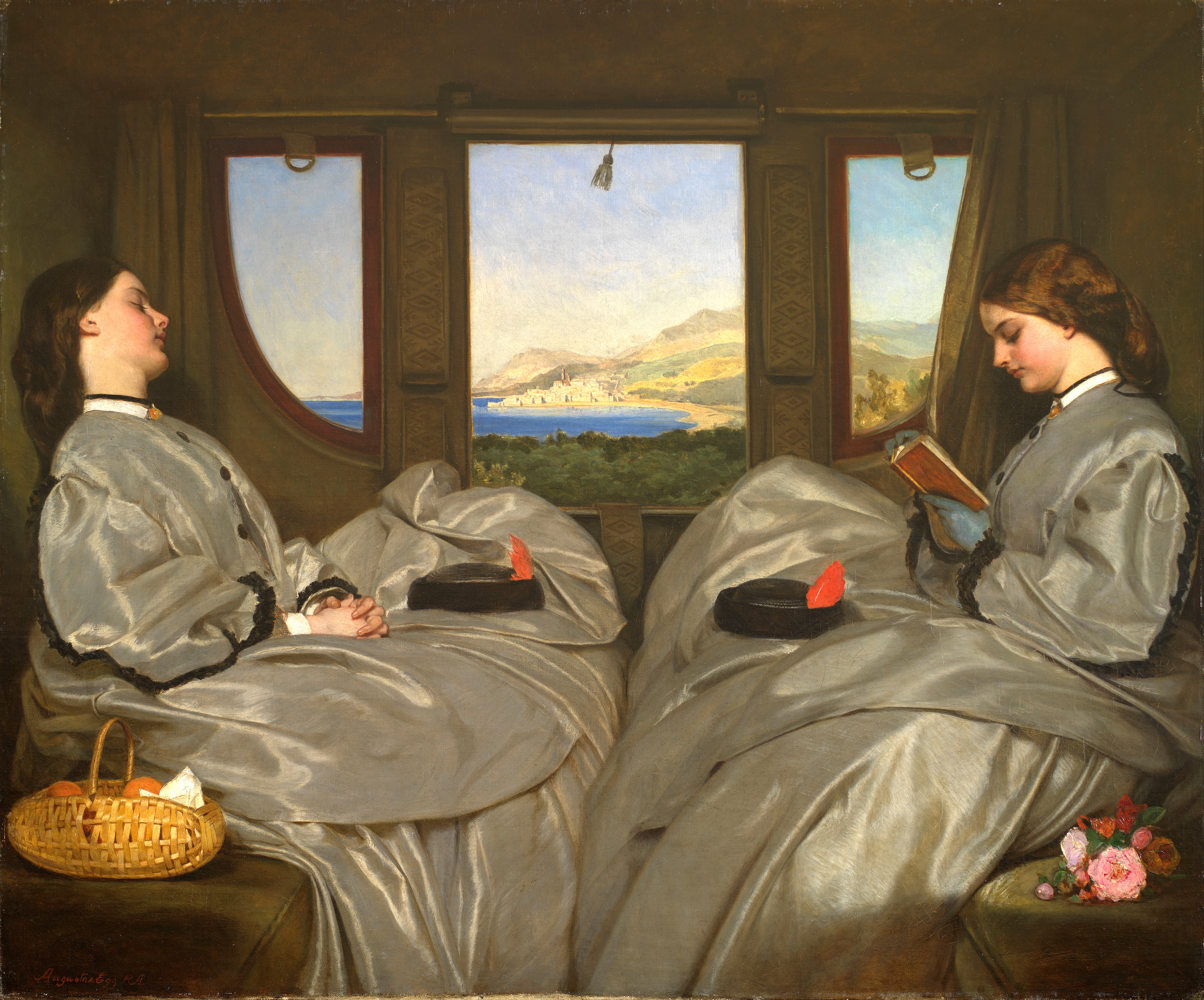
The Travelling Companions by Augustus Egg, 1862

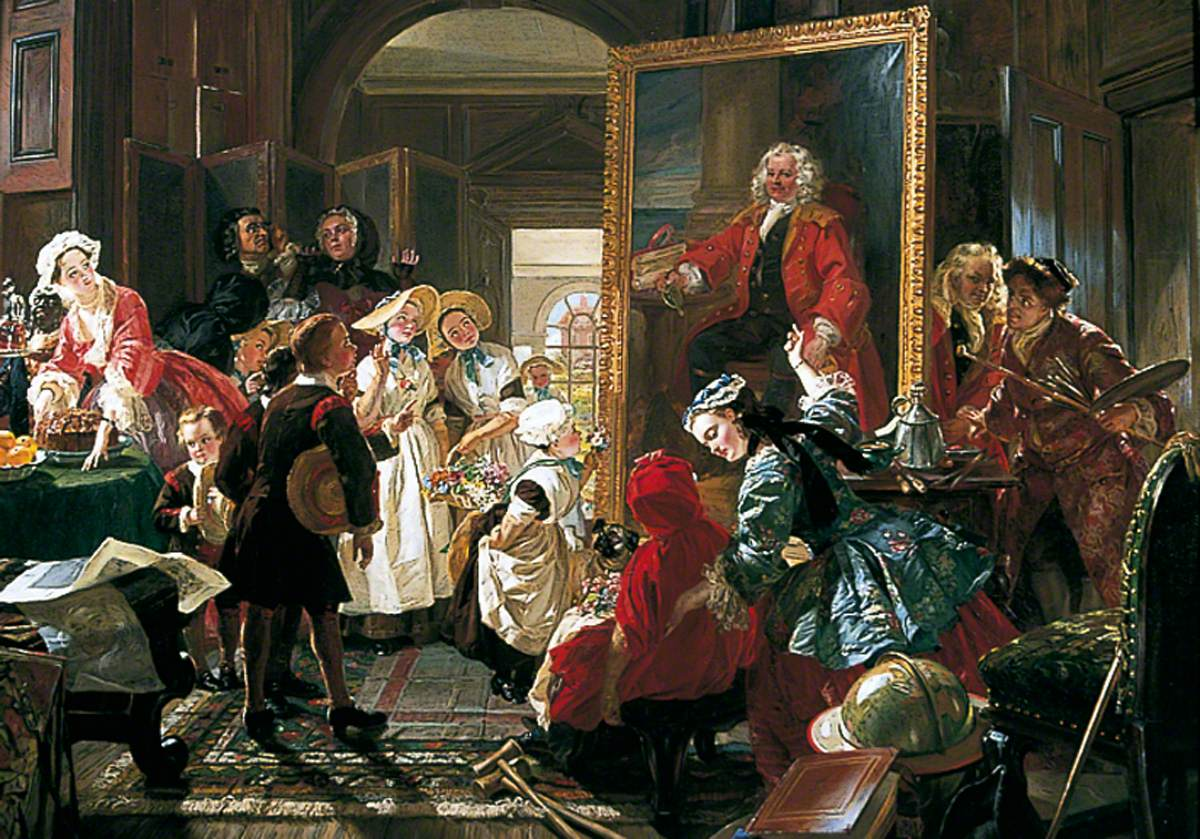
Hogarth's Studio in 1739 by Edward Matthew Ward, 1863

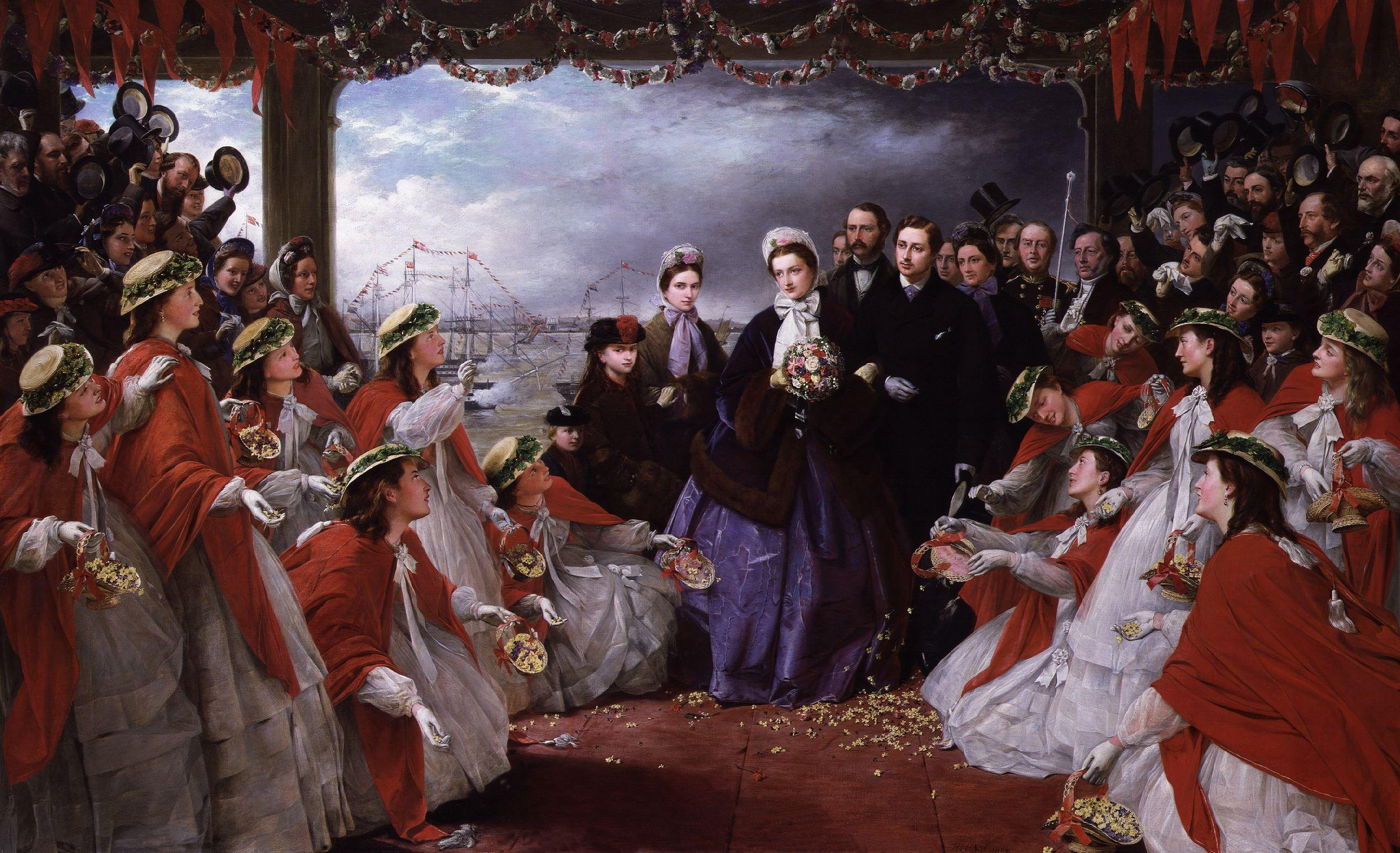
The Landing of Princess Alexandra at Gravesend by Henry Nelson O'Neil, 1864

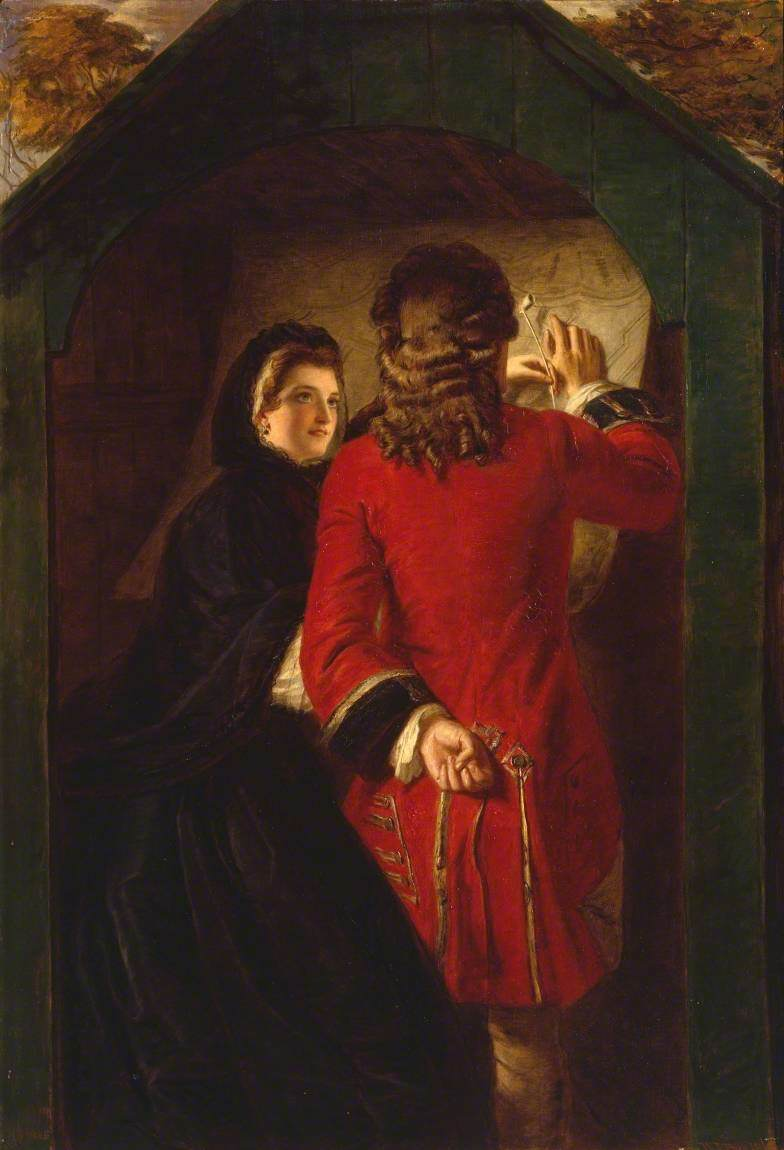
Uncle Toby and the Widow Wadman by William Powell Frith, 1865

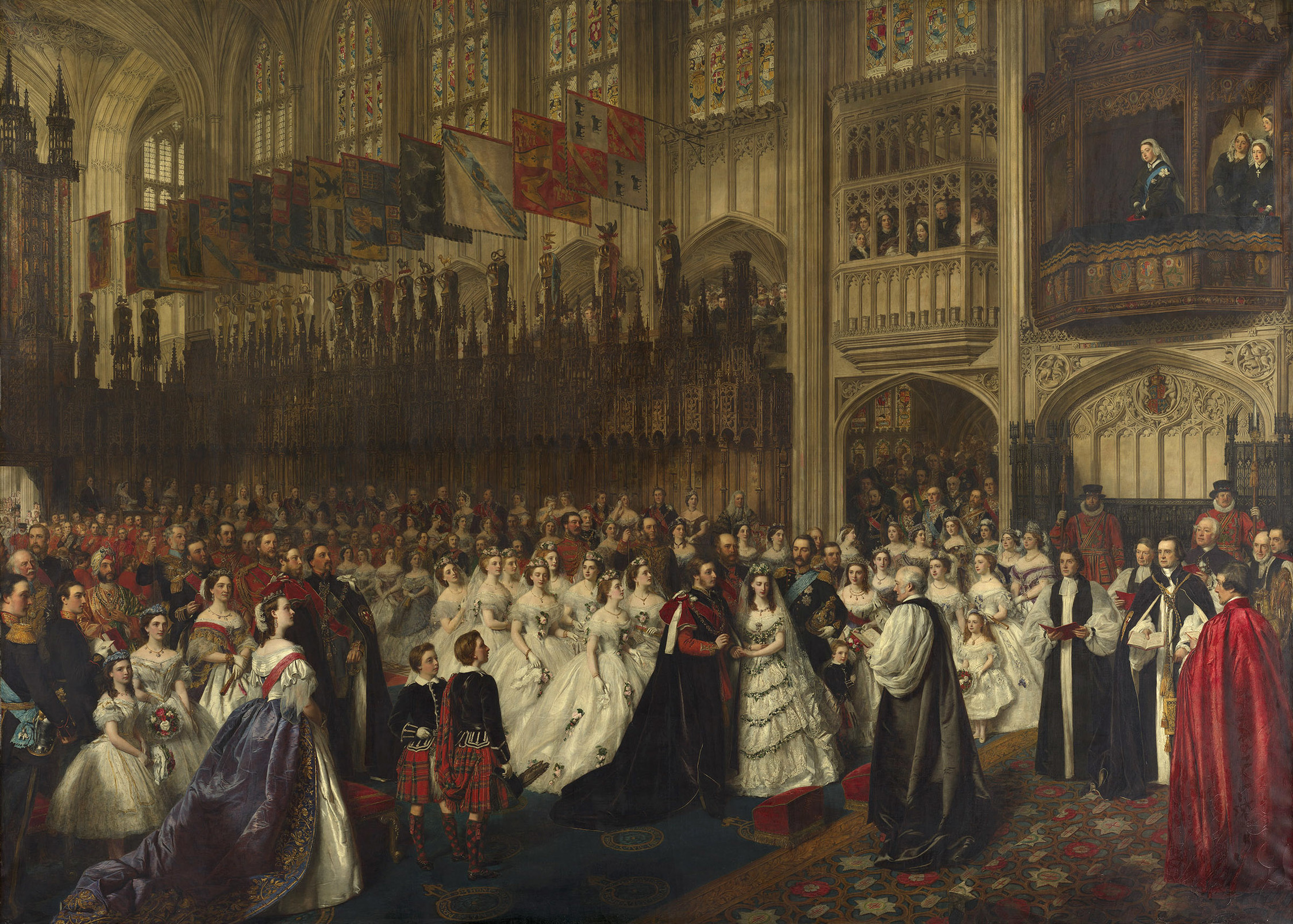
The Marriage of the Prince of Wales by William Powell Frith, 1865

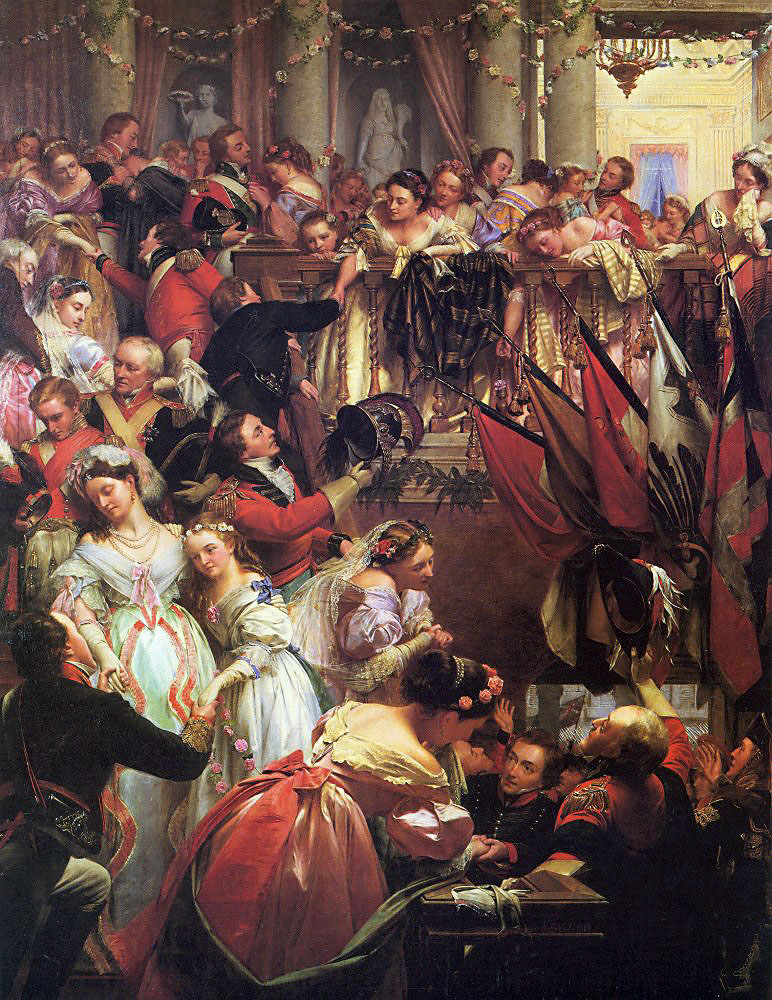
Before Waterloo by Henry Nelson O'Neil, 1868

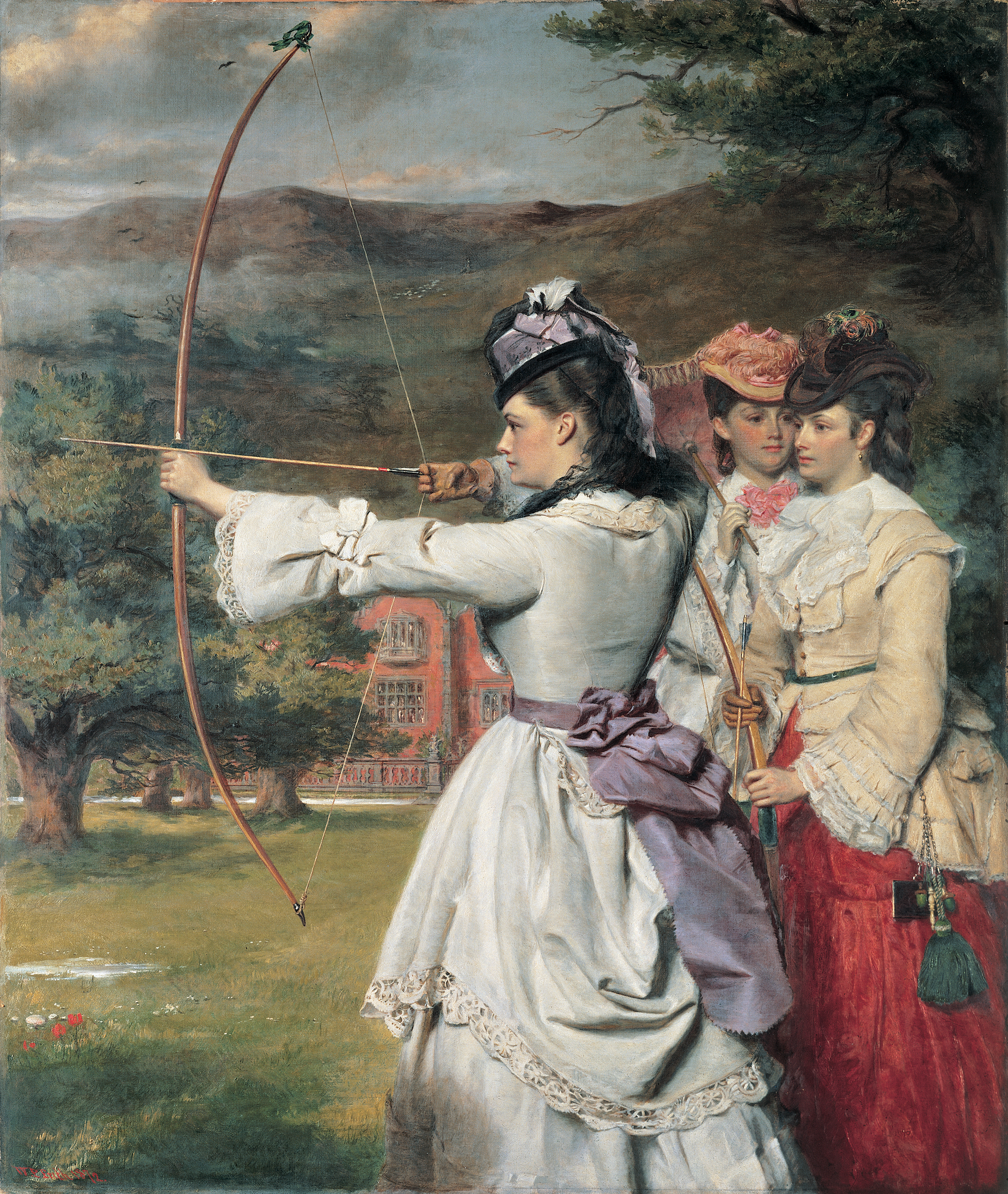
The Fair Toxophilites by William Powell Frith, 1872

== Literature ==
- Cowling, Mary. Victorian Figurative Painting. London, Andreas Papadakis Publisher, 2001.
- Valentine, Helen, ed. Art in the Age of Queen Victoria: Treasures from the Royal Academy of Arts Permanent Collection. New Haven and London, Yale University Press/Royal Academy of Arts, London, 1999.
