= A Volunteer =

Painting by Henry Nelson O'Neil

- Artist: Henry Nelson O'Neil
- Year: 1860
- Type: Oil on canvas, genre painting
- Dimensions: 157.5 cm × 223.5 cm (62.0 in × 88.0 in)
- Location: Private collection

A Volunteer is an 1860 oil painting by the British artist Henry Nelson O'Neil. It depicts a shipwreck, in which a sailor volunteers to swim ashore to try and attach a line in order to save those survivors aboard. It was inspired by the real-life sinking off Anglesey of the Royal Charter in November 1859 during a major storm. The ship was carrying passengers from Australia when it struck rocks off the Welsh coast. A Maltese sailor named Joseph Rodgers volunteered to try and make his way ashore in the rough seas. Potential rescuers can be seen on the rocks to the left of the painting

O'Neil was a noted member of The Clique who produced scenes of everyday life. The painting was displayed at the Royal Academy Exhibition of 1860 held at the National Gallery in London. Although a typical demonstration of Victorian heroism, the reception of audiences would have been balanced with the knowledge that the vast majority of those aboard The Royal Charter had not survived.

== Bibliography ==
- Begiato, Joanne. Manliness in Britain, 1760–1900: Bodies, Emotion, and Material Culture. Manchester University Press, 2020.
- Casteras, Susan P. Virtue Rewarded: Victorian Paintings from the Forbes Magazine Collection. JB Speed Art Museum, 1988.
- Fletcher, Pamela. The Victorian Painting of Modern Life. Taylor & Francis, 2024.
- Payne, Christiana. Where the Sea Meets the Land: Artists on the Coast in Nineteenth-century Britain. Sanson, 2007.
