= The Pre-Raphaelite =

Painting by Henry Nelson O'Neil

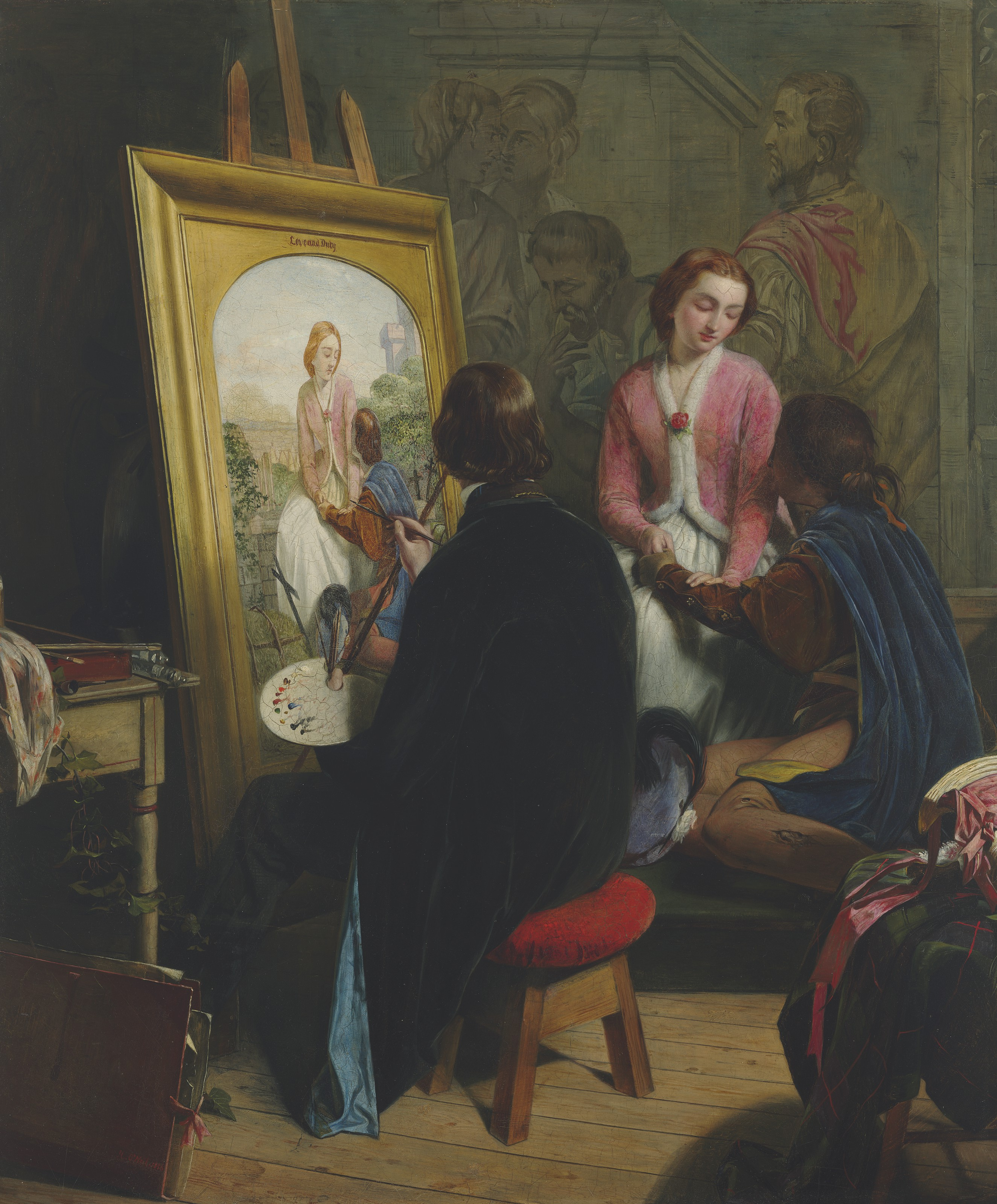
- Artist: Henry Nelson O'Neil
- Year: 1856
- Type: Oil on panel, genre painting
- Dimensions: 47 cm × 39.3 cm (19 in × 15.5 in)
- Location: Private collection

The Pre-Raphaelite is an 1856 oil painting by the British artist Henry Nelson O'Neil. It shows an artist sitting at work on a painting on an easel as his two models pose for him. The picture was intended as a satirical take on the Pre-Raphaelite Brotherhood, then at the height of its prominence. The artist is shown depicting a scene from the Romantic poem Love and Duty by Alfred Tennyson, who was a particular inspiration to the Pre-Raphaelites.

O'Neil was a member of The Clique, a group of artists that pre-dated the Pre-Raphaelites by a decade. They were also critical of many of the rules of traditional Academic art, but remained hostile to the style of the Pre-Raphaelites, particularly O'Neil. It was displayed at the 1857 exhibition of the British Institute in London along with a pendant painting The Post Raphaelite under the joint subtitle Two Extremes. The pendant painting made similar fun of a too-Academic style of painting. The two works were discussed in The Art Journal. It was auctioned by Christie's in 2021.

== Bibliography ==
- Cooper, Suzanne Fagence. Pre-Raphaelite Art in the Victoria and Albert Museum. Harry N. Abrams, 2003.
- Pointon, Marcia R. (ed.) Pre-Raphaelites Re-viewed. Manchester University Press, 1989.
