= The Last Moments of Raphael =

Painting by Henry Nelson O'Neil

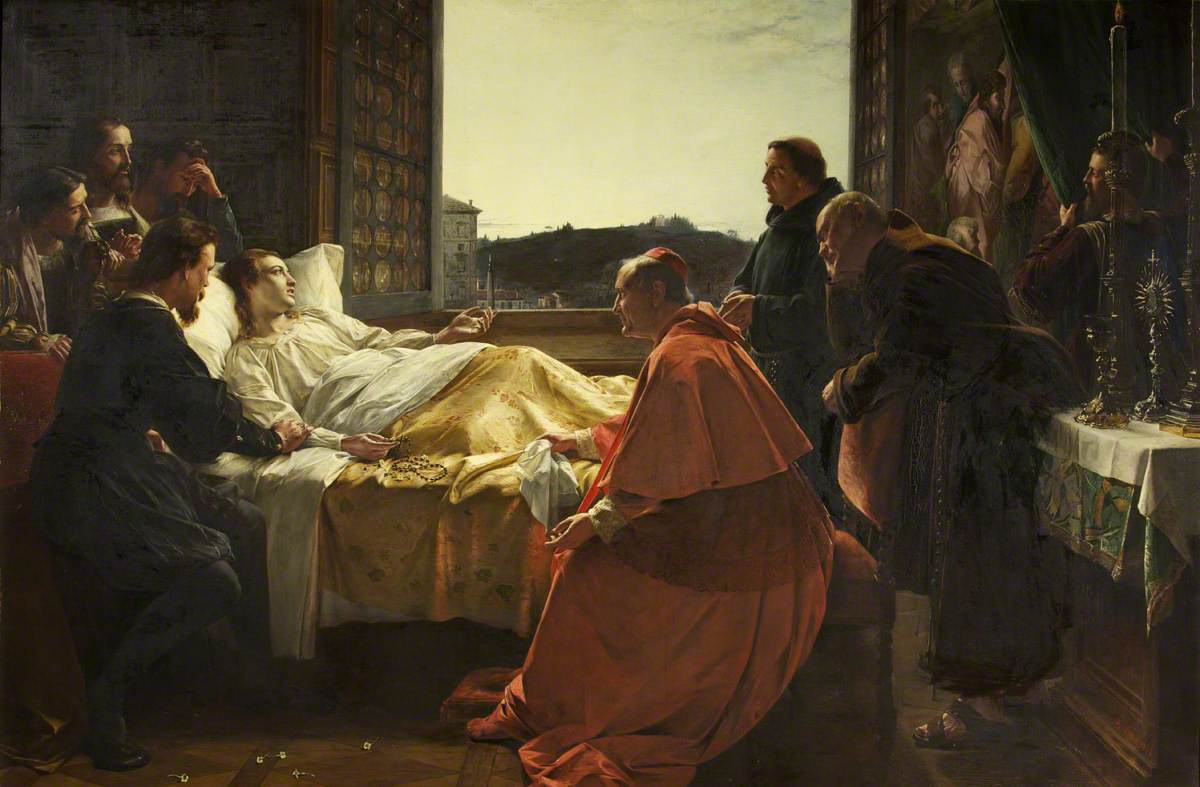
- Artist: Henry Nelson O'Neil
- Year: 1866
- Type: Oil on canvas, history painting
- Dimensions: 121.1 cm × 183.5 cm (47.7 in × 72.2 in)
- Location: Bristol Museum and Art Gallery, Bristol

The Last Moments of Raphael is an 1866 history painting by the British artist Henry Nelson O'Neil. It depicts the death scene of Raphael, the celebrated artist and architect of the High Renaissance, in Rome in 1520. He is shown gazing at his unfinished final work. It was part of a popular trend for pictures featuring the final moments of great men, which O'Neil excelled in during the Victorian era.

The painting was displayed at the Royal Academy Exhibition of 1866 held at the National Gallery in London. It now forms part of the collection of Bristol Museum and Art Gallery, having been acquired in 1911.

== Bibliography ==
- Casteras, Susan P. Virtue Rewarded: Victorian Paintings from the Forbes Magazine Collection. JB Speed Art Museum, 1988.
- Cheeke, Stephen. Transfiguration: The Religion of Art in Nineteenth-Century Literature Before Aestheticism. OUP Oxford, 2016.
- Potter, Matthew C. (ed.) The Concept of the 'Master' in Art Education in Britain and Ireland, 1770 to the Present. Taylor & Francis, 2017.
- Smithers, Tamara. The Cults of Raphael and Michelangelo: Artistic Sainthood and Memorials as a Second Life. Taylor & Francis, 2022.
