= The Dying Contrabandista =

Painting by John Phillip

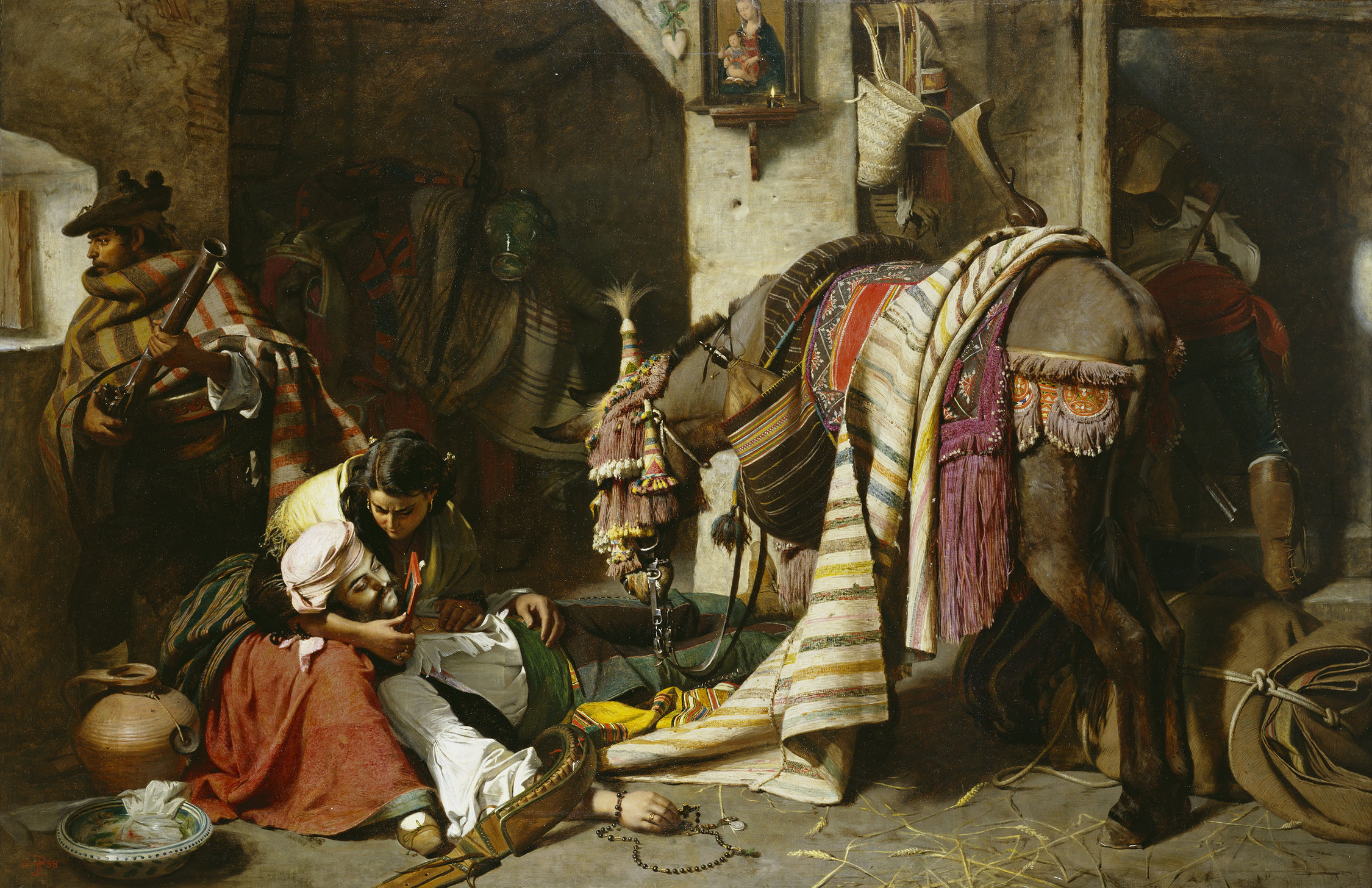
- Artist: John Phillip
- Year: 1858
- Type: Oil on canvas, genre painting
- Dimensions: 132.1 cm × 203.2 cm (52.0 in × 80.0 in)
- Location: Royal Collection

The Dying Contrabandista is an oil on canvas genre painting by the British artist John Phillip, from 1858. It is held in the Royal Collection.

== History and description ==
Formerly a member of The Clique artistic group, later in his career Phillip concentrated on scenes of Spanish life and was a favourite painter of Queen Victoria.

The canvas portrays a fatally wounded smuggler (Spanish: contrabandista), with a very pale look and a rosary at his right hand, dying in the arms of his beloved. Other two members of the smugglers gang, stands sentry, looking out of the windows, one of them, at the left, is holding a blunderbuss. The dying's man donkey stands nearby. The theme of a wounded guerrilla had previously been used by David Wilkie in a scene of the Peninsular War. It was displayed the Royal Academy's Summer Exhibition of 1858.

It provided inspiration for the 1866 opera The Contrabandista by Arthur Sullivan and F.C. Burnand. The work was acquired by Queen Victoria in 1858 for 650 guineas as a Christmas gift for her husband, Prince Albert. Today the painting remains in the Royal Collection.

== Bibliography ==
- Clarke, Deborah & Remington, Vanessa. Scottish Artists 1750-1900: From Caledonia to the Continent. Royal Collection Trust, 2015.
- Lawrence, Mark. Anglo-Hispania Beyond the Black Legend: British Campaigns, Travellers and Attitudes Towards Spain Since 1489. Bloomsbury Publishing, 2023
