= Henry Nelson O'Neil =

English painter (1817–1880)

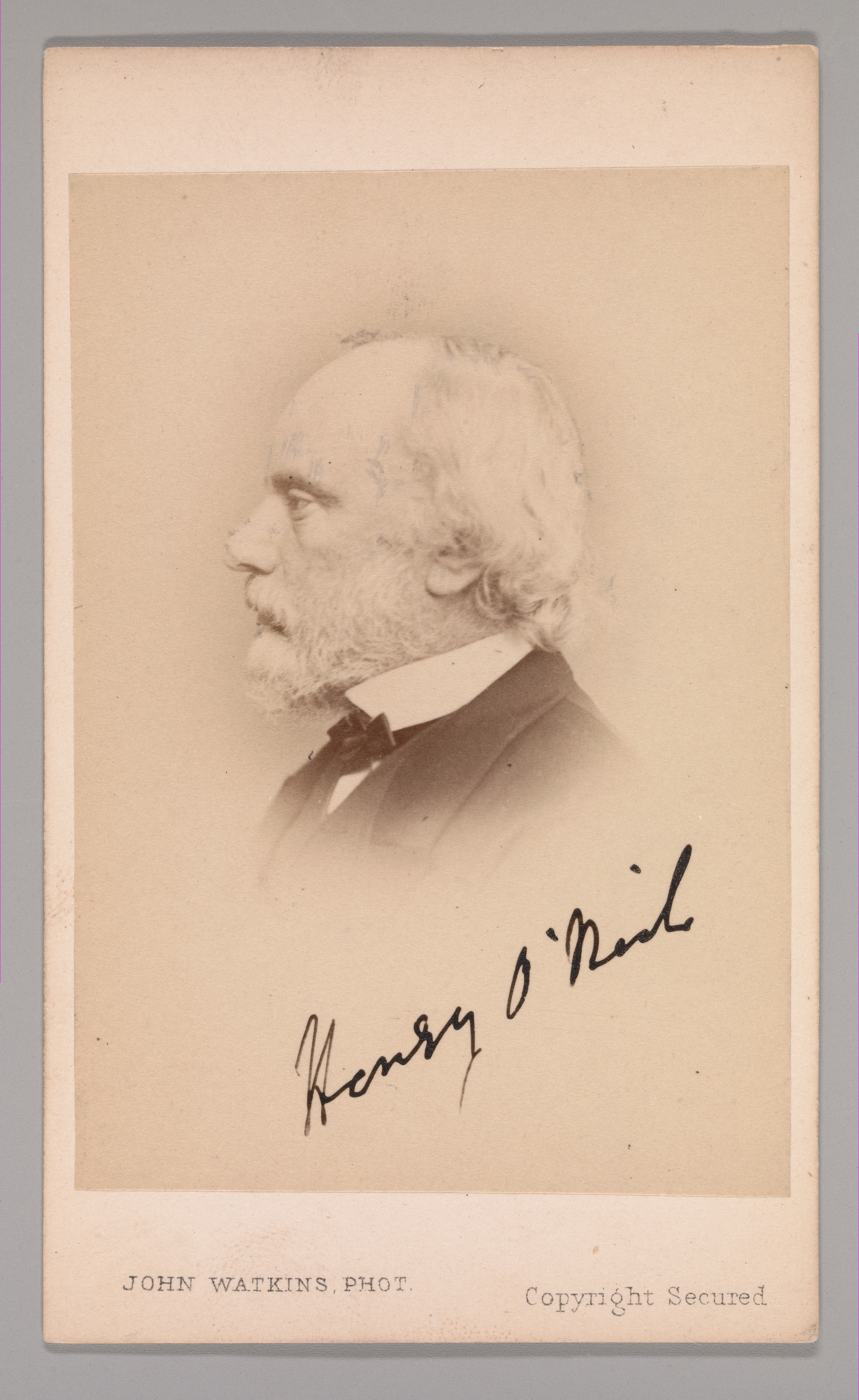
- Photograph by John Watkins
- Born: 7 January 1817; Saint Petersburg, Russian Empire
- Died: 13 March 1880 (aged 63); Kensington, England
- Known for: Painting
- Movement: The Clique

Henry Nelson O'Neil ARA (1817, Russia — 13 March 1880) was a historical genre painter and minor Victorian writer. He worked primarily with historical and literary subjects, but his best-known paintings dealt with the Indian Mutiny. Eastward, Ho!, dated August 1857 but exhibited the following year, depicts the British troops embarking for India. A second painting, Home Again (1859), shows the troops returning to England. He also had popular successes with romantic scenes portraying the deaths of Mozart and Raphael, depicted as though mentally transported to heaven by their own religious art. In The Last Moments of Mozart the dying composer listens to singers performing part of his Requiem. The Last Moments of Raphael shows the painter contemplating the unseen figure of Christ in his Transfiguration.

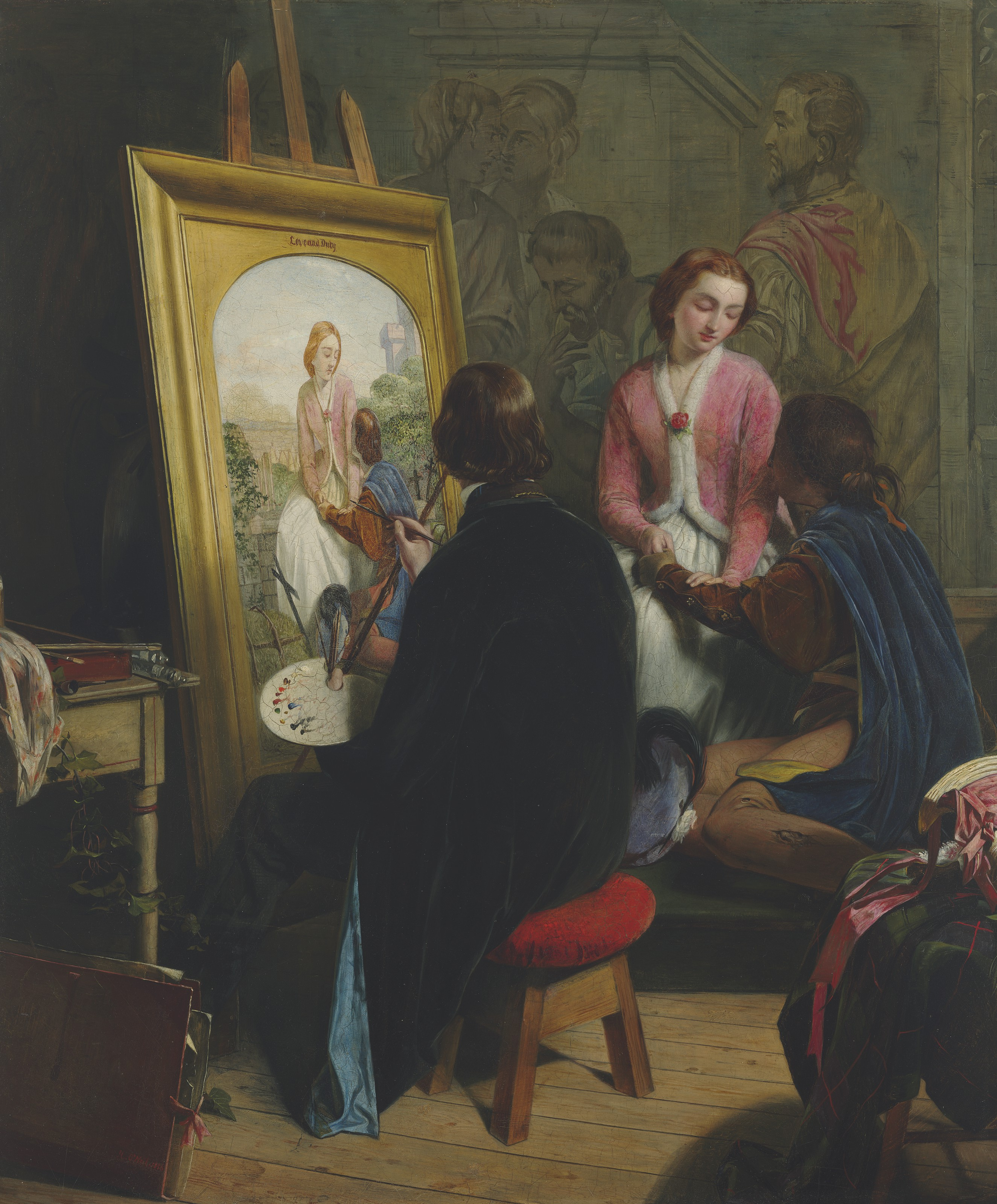
The Pre-Raphaelite, a satire on the Pre-Raphaelites by O'Neil, 1857

== The Clique ==
O'Neil was born in St. Petersburg and joined the Royal Academy Schools in 1833 as a pupil along with Alfred Elmore. O'Neil was a member of The Clique, a group of artists in the 1840s who, like the later Pre-Raphaelite Brotherhood, met regularly to discuss and criticize one another's works. The other members of The Clique were Augustus Egg, Alfred Elmore, Richard Dadd, William Powell Frith, John Phillip, Edward Matthew Ward. Along with Elmore he travelled to Italy in 1840 and on return he produced several paintings which made him famous. These included ‘ By the Rivers of Babylon,’ ‘Catherine of Aragon,’ and ‘Ahasuerus and the Scribes.’ Further fame came with ‘Eastward, Ho!’ of 1857, and ‘Home Again.’

== Later career ==
Most of the Clique opposed the Pre-Raphaelites, but O'Neil was the most virulent in his condemnation of the movement, attacking them in both paintings and writings. These included his futuristic fantasy Two Thousand Years Hence (1867), which portrayed Britain in the year 3867 as a frozen wasteland excavated by an archaeologist from New Zealand. The archaeologist uncovers evidence of the decline of British culture in the nineteenth century, allowing O'Neil to vent his own distinctly reactionary political views, predicting dire consequences of the Reform Act 1867.

In July 1865, O'Neil accompanied the Great Eastern on her voyage to lay the cable of the Atlantic telegraph, hoping to find on board a subject suitable for a picture: the unfortunate breaking of the cable, however, prevented the accomplishment of the artist's intention. During the voyage he edited and illustrated five issues of the shipboard newsletter The Atlantic Telegraph, and on his return to England he published an account of the expedition in Blackwood's Edinburgh Magazine. In 1866 he again accompanied the cable expedition, producing five more publications which were printed on board, and later wrote a humorous account of the voyage for the magazine London Society.

== Gallery ==
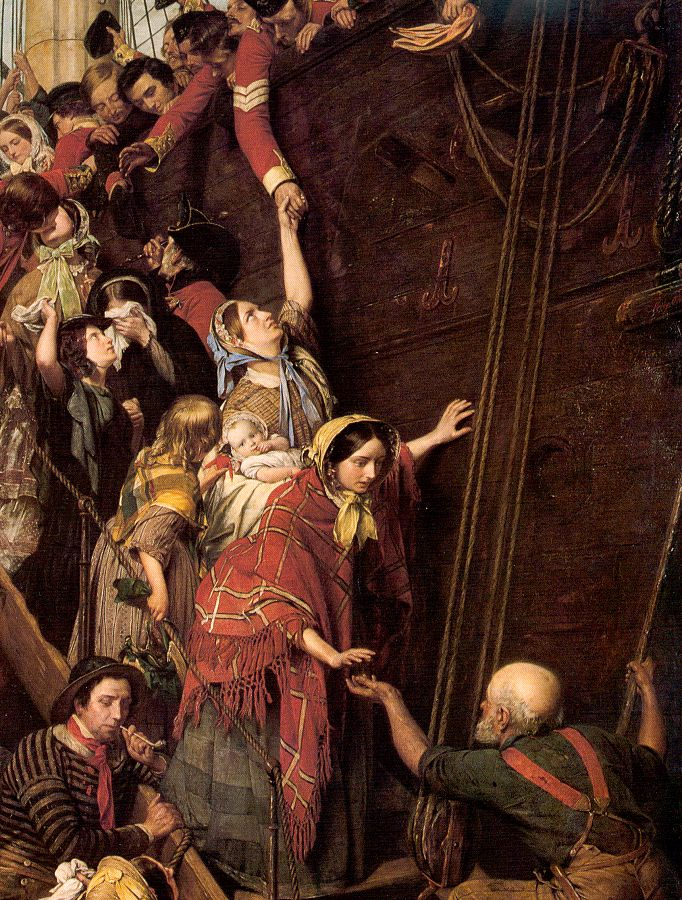
Eastward Ho! (1857)

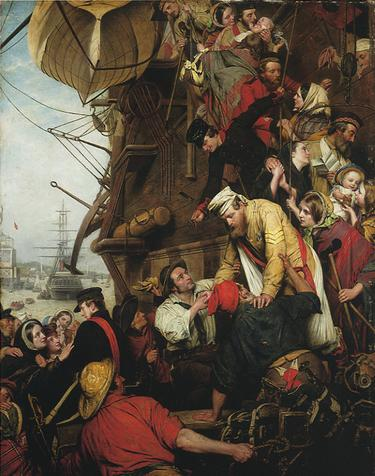
Home Again (1859)

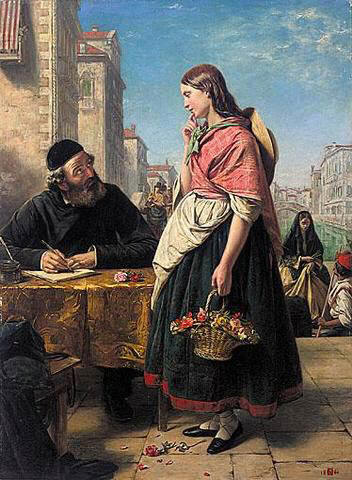
The Letter Writer (1860)

A Volunteer (1860)

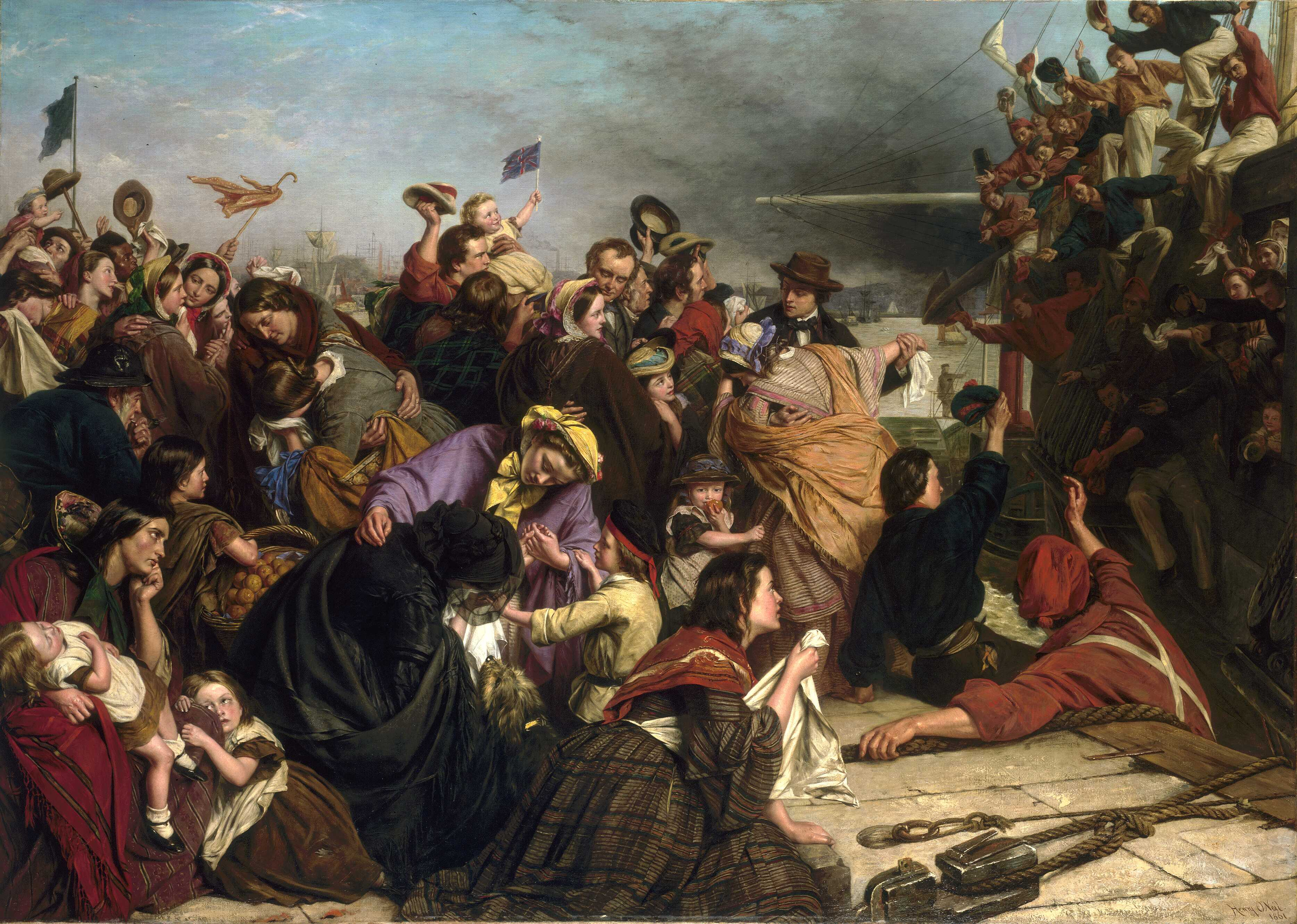
The Parting Cheer (1861)

Mary Stuart's Farewell to France (1862)

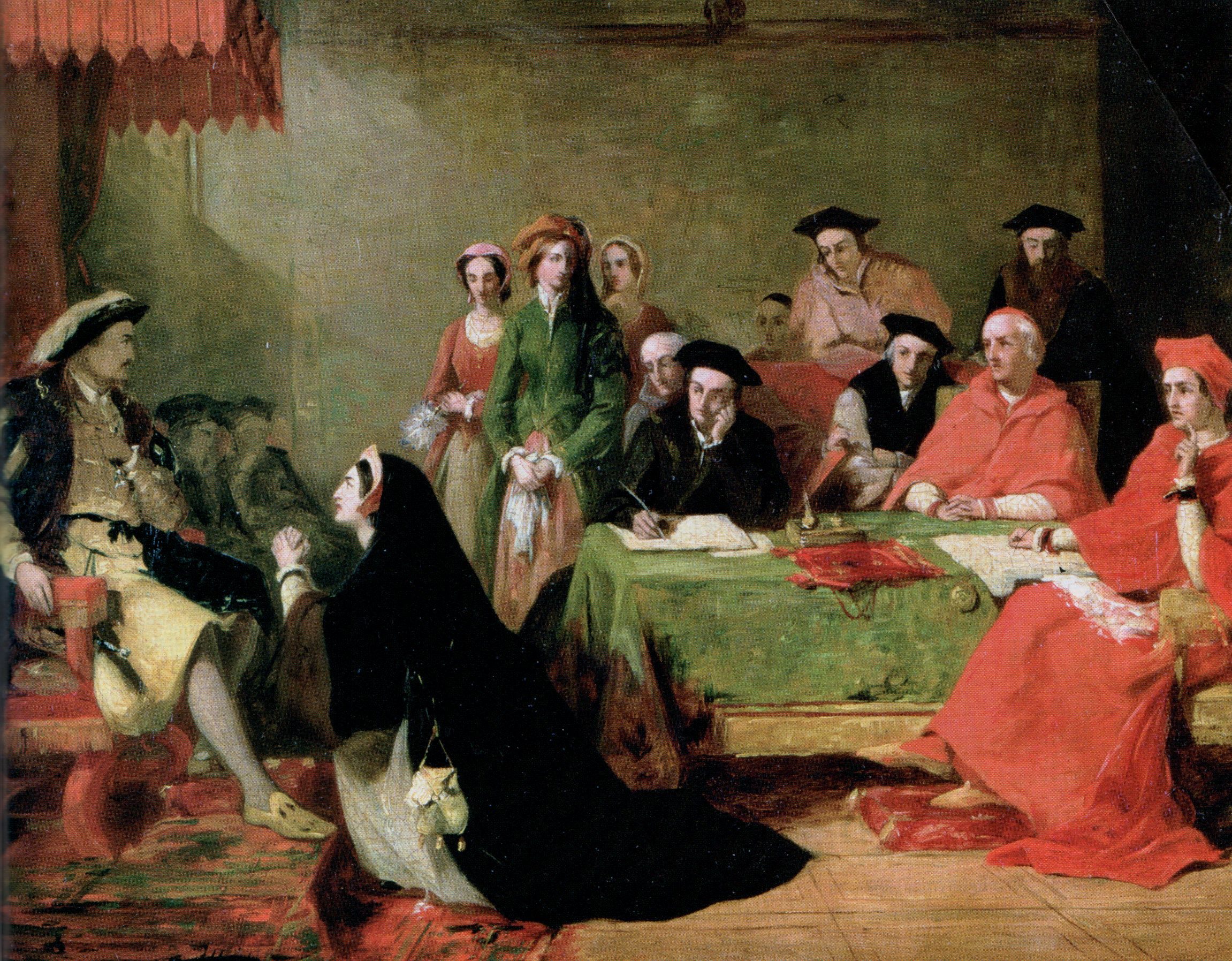
The Trial of Katherine of Aragon

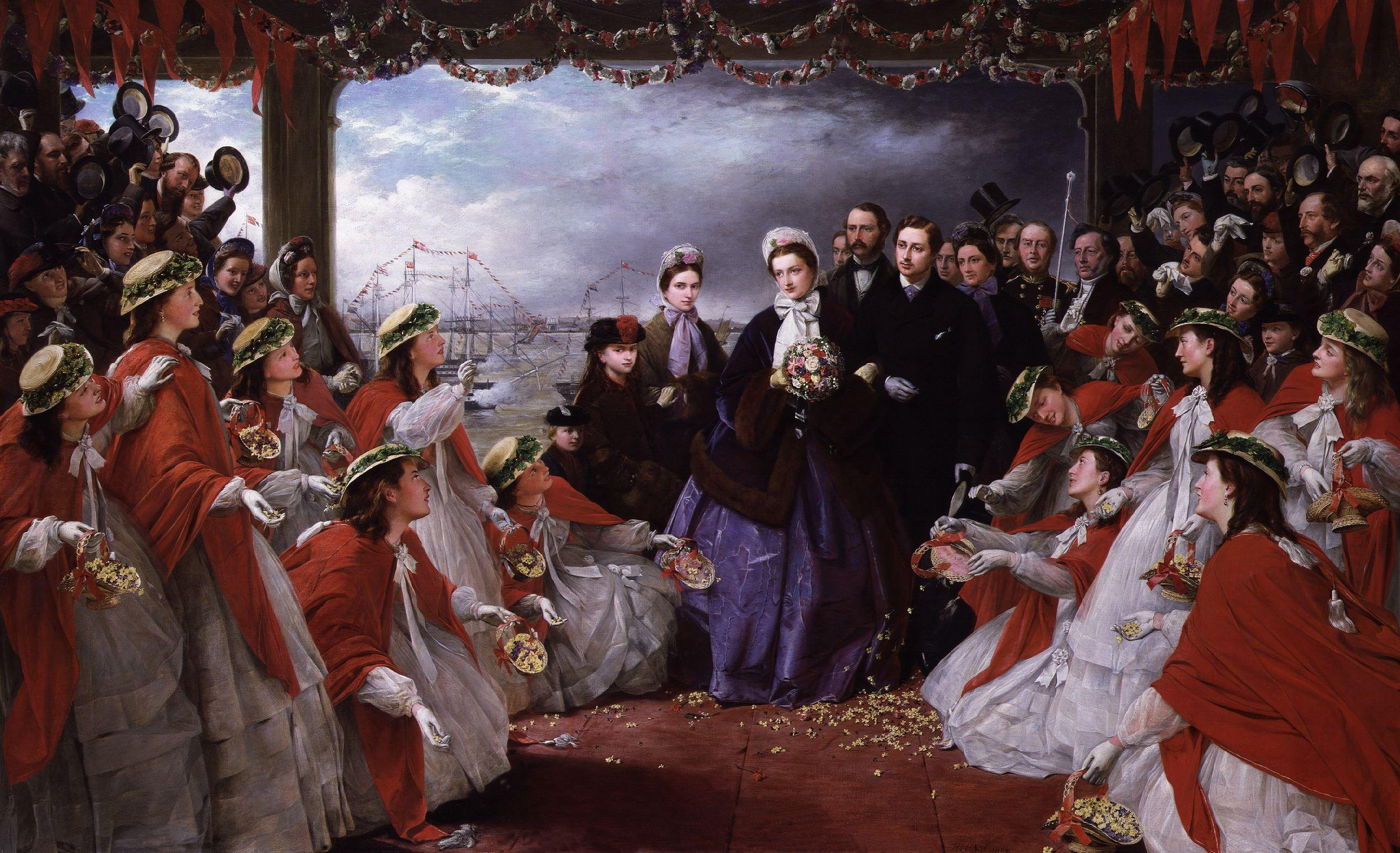
The Landing of Princess Alexandra at Gravesend (1864; National Maritime Museum, London)

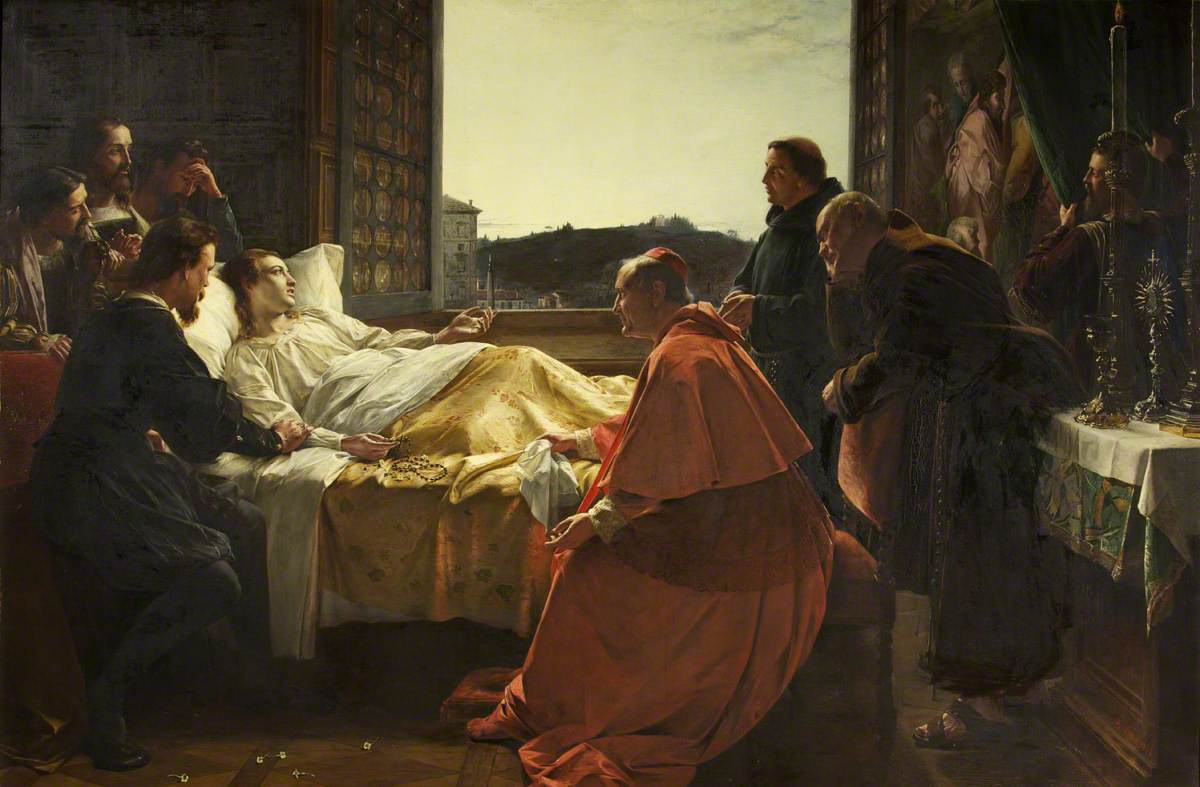
The Last Moments of Raphael (1866)

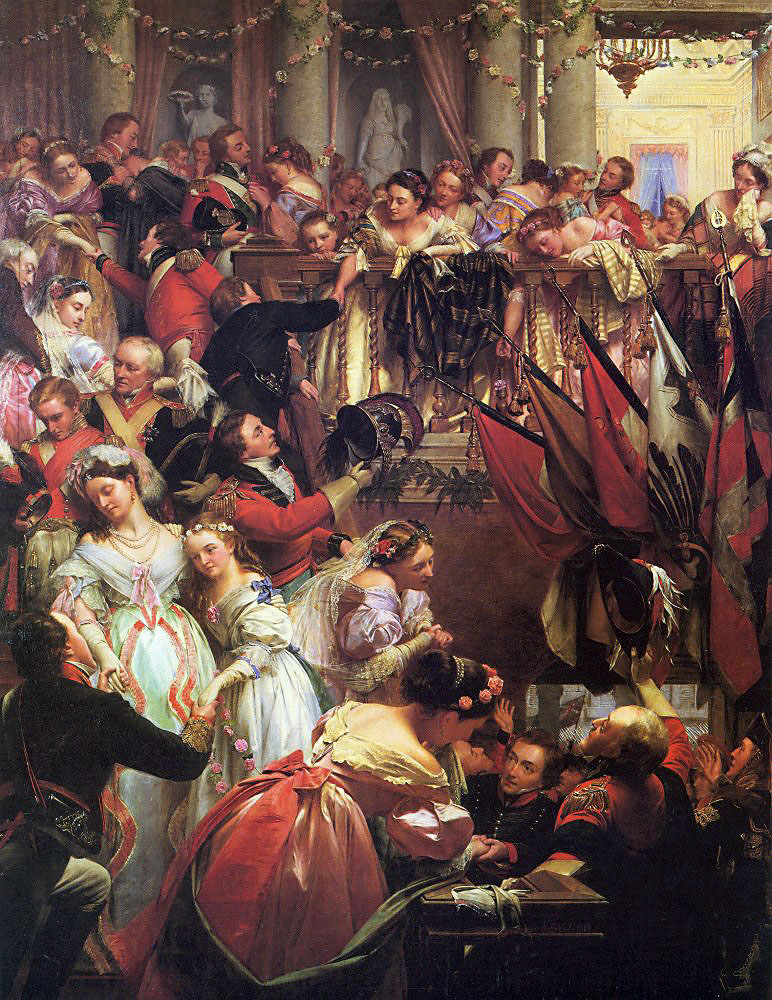
Before Waterloo (1868)

The Billiard Room (1869)

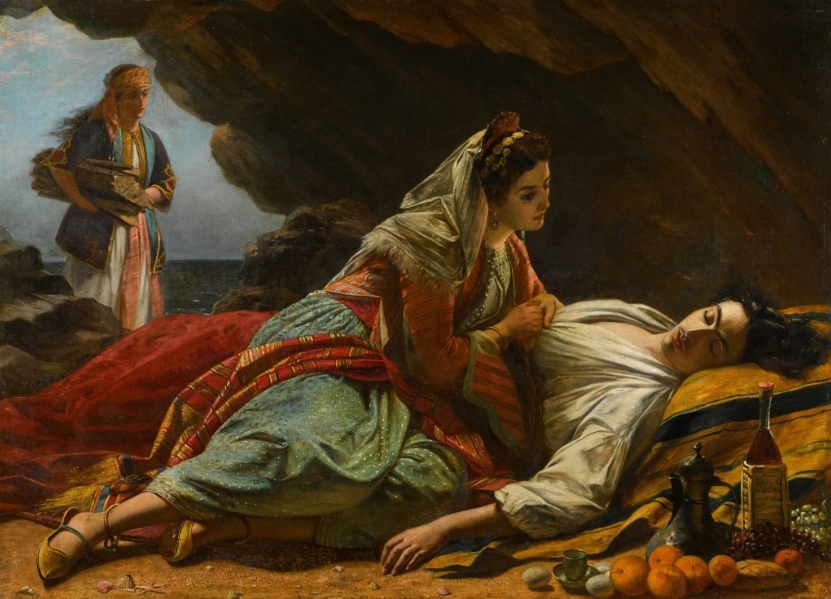
Haidee and Don Juan (1870)

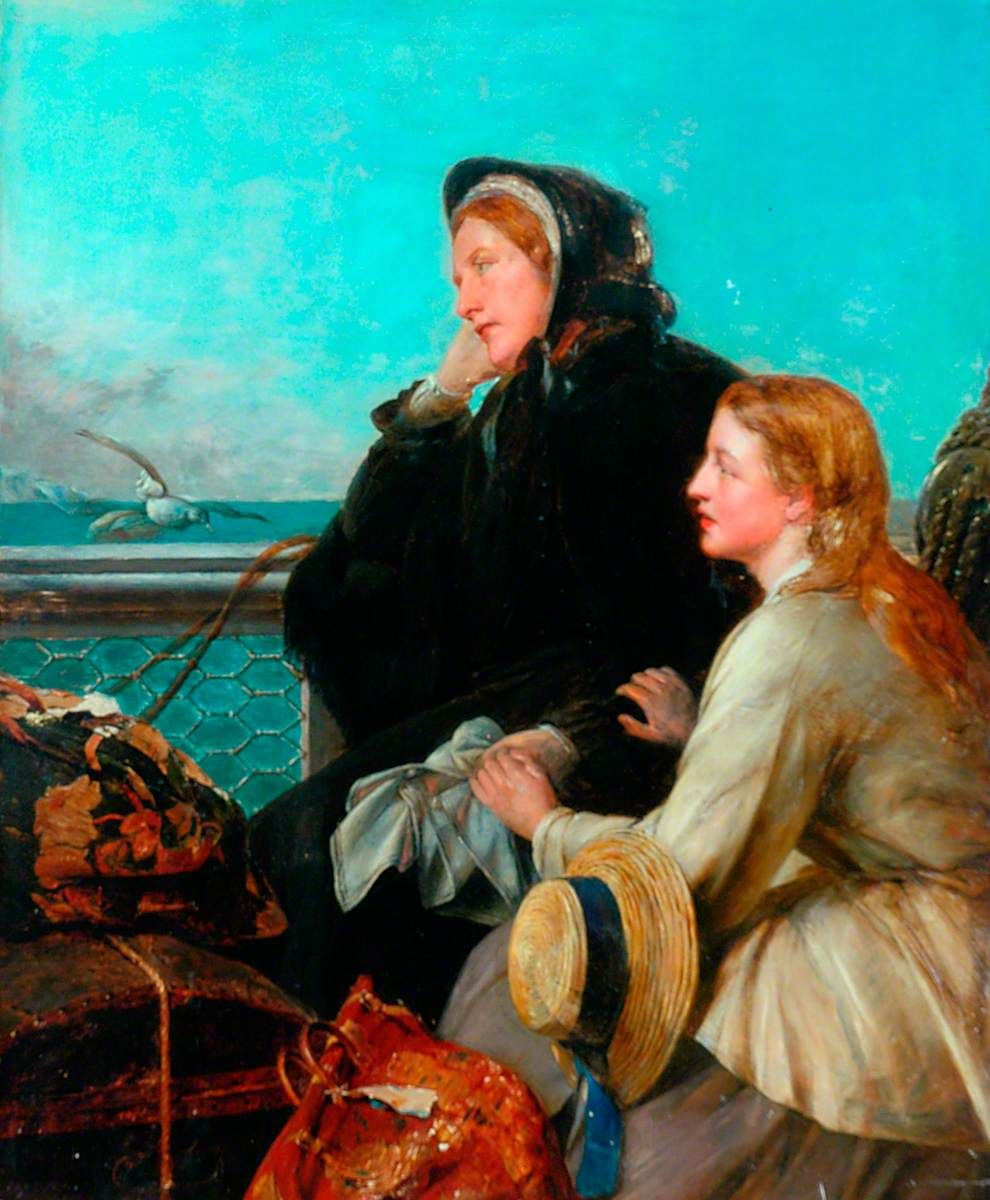
My Native Land, Goodbye (1879)

== Bibliography ==
- Bills, Mark & Knight, Vivien (ed.) William Powell Frith: Painting the Victorian Age. Yale University Press, 2006
- Wood, Christopher. William Powell Frith: A Painter and His World. Sutton Publishing, 2006.
