= Eastward Ho! (painting) =

1858 painting by Henry Nelson O'Neil

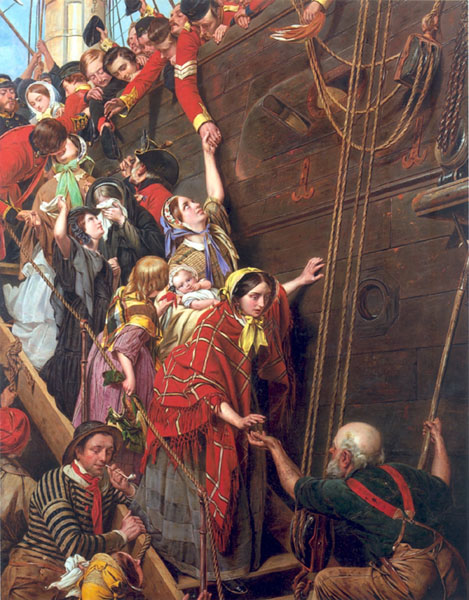
- Artist: Henry Nelson O'Neil
- Year: 1858
- Type: Oil on canvas
- Location: Museum of London, London

Eastward Ho! is an 1858 genre painting by the British artist Henry Nelson O'Neil. It depicts troops departing to combat the Indian Mutiny embarking from Gravesend while their families bid them farewell. It was exhibited at the Royal Academy's Summer Exhibition in 1858. In 1859 it was displayed at Grundy's Repository in Liverpool. Today it is part of the collection of the Museum of London.

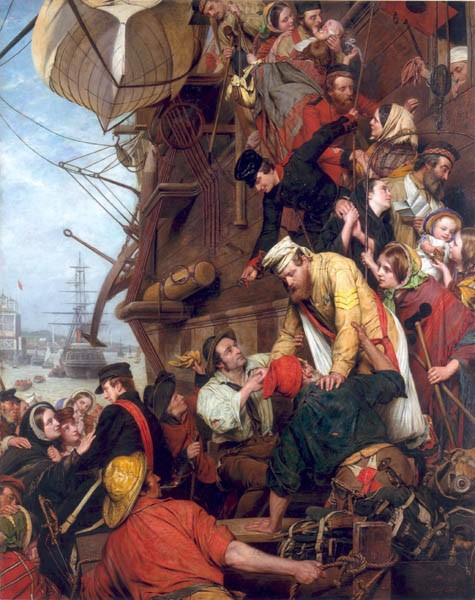
Home Again, 1859.

The popularity of O'Neil's work led him to produce a sequel Home Again in 1859, depicting several of the same figures from the original painting, which shows troops arriving back from overseas service. This was exhibited at the Royal Academy that year and is also now in the Museum of London.

== Bibliography ==
- Bills, Mark & Knight, Vivien (ed.) William Powell Frith: Painting the Victorian Age. Yale University Press, 2006
- Hichberger, J.W.M. Images of the army: The military in British art, 1815-1914. Manchester University Press, 2017.
- Newall, Christopher & Bukantas, Ann Pre-Raphaelites: Beauty and Rebellion. Oxford University Press, 2016.
- Quilley, Geoff. British Art and the East India Company. Boydell & Brewer, 2020.
- Shaw, Philip. Suffering and Sentiment in Romantic Military Art. Routledge, 2017.
