= My Native Land, Goodbye =

Painting by Henry Nelson O'Neil

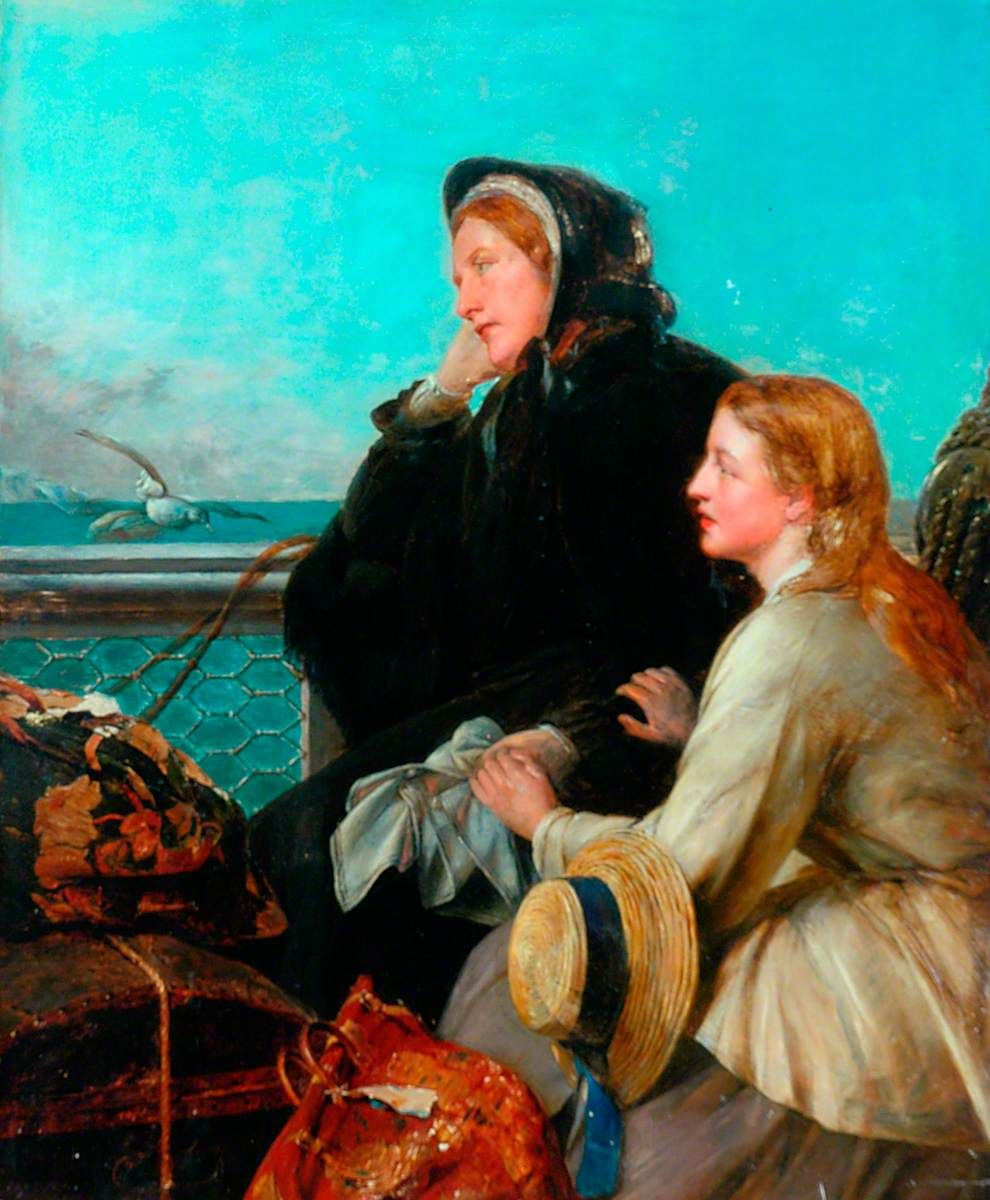
- Artist: Henry Nelson O'Neil
- Year: 1879
- Type: Oil on panel, genre painting
- Dimensions: 61.5 cm × 50.6 cm (24.2 in × 19.9 in)
- Location: Smith Art Gallery, Brighouse

My Native Land, Goodbye is an 1879 oil painting by the British artist Henry Nelson O'Neil. It features the strained faces of emigrants leaving Britain for a life overseas, probably in one of the British Dominions. It was one of the final paintings by O'Neil, who had been a member of The Clique earlier in his career. The picture was displayed at the Royal Academy Exhibition of 1879 held at Burlington House in London under the title My Native Land, Good Night a quote from Lord Byron. The painting was owned by Alderman William Smith who presented it to the Smith Art Gallery in his native Brighouse in Yorkshire, later transferred to the control of Calderdale borough.

== Bibliography ==
- Matthews, Jodie. The Gypsy Woman: Representations in Literature and Visual Culture. Bloomsbury Publishing, 2020.
- Roe, Sonia. Oil Paintings in Public Ownership in West Yorkshire. Public Catalogue Foundation, 2007.
