= Royal Academy Exhibition of 1879 =

1879 art exhibition in London

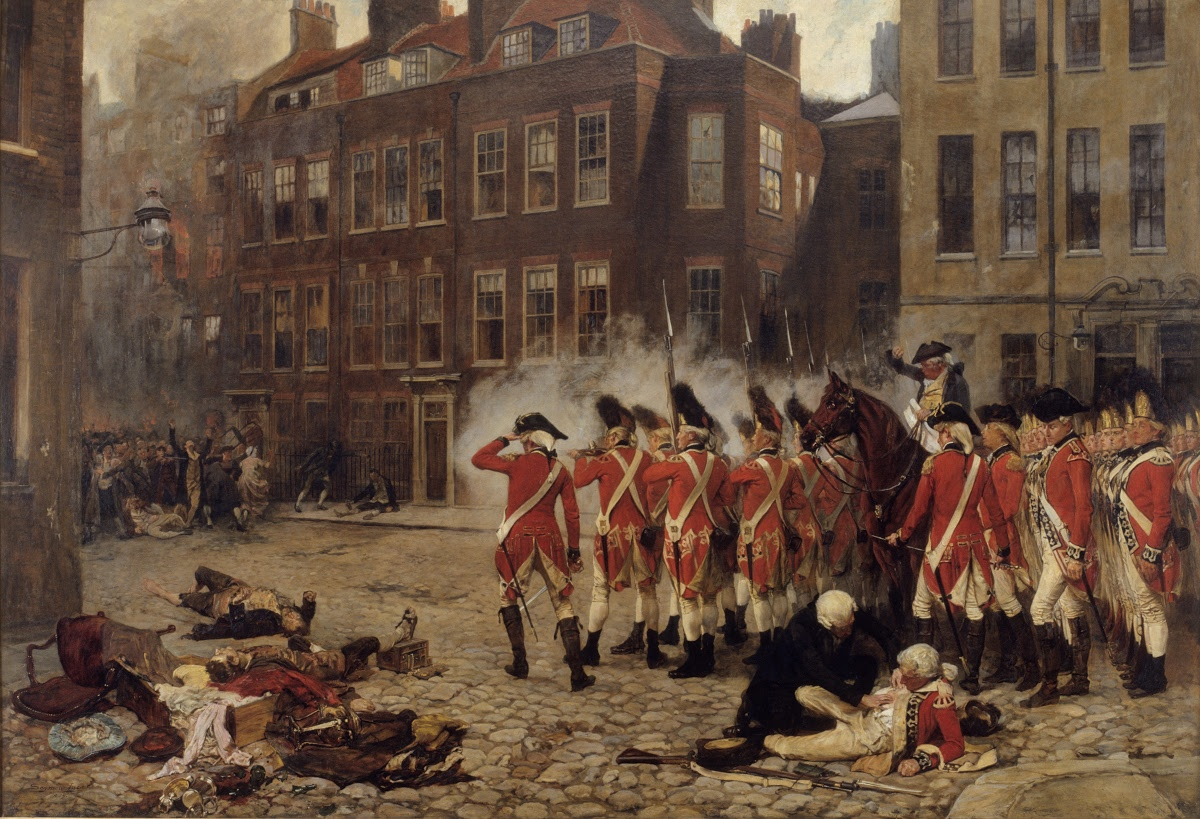
The Gordon Riots by John Seymour Lucas

Royal Academy Exhibition of 1879 was the hundred and eleventh annual Summer Exhibition of the British Royal Academy of Arts. It was held at Burlington House in London's Piccadilly from 5 May to 4 August 1879 and attracted 391,000 visitors. It featured submissions of paintings, sculpture, etchings and architectural drawings from leading artists and architects of the Victorian Era. It was the first to take place since Frederic Leighton had succeeded Francis Grant as President of the Royal Academy.

Elizabeth Thompson displayed two scenes of military art Listed for the Connaught Rangers and Remnants of an Army, the latter depicting a scene from the Retreat from Kabul in 1842. The most talked-about of the portraits was John Everett Millais' Portrait of William Ewart Gladstone featuring the politician who served as Prime Minister four times. The Scottish artists John Pettie's history painting The Death Warrant was widely praised. The landscape painting The Waning of the Year by Ernest Parton was acquired through the Chantrey Bequest and one critic suggested "if we go on in this manner we shall, in the international race, overtake France one of these days". Despite the success of his Road to Ruin series the previous year, the veteran painter William Powell Frith did not exhibit any works that year.

Historical paintings of scenes from British history were on display. The Gordon Riots by John Seymour Lucas depicted the 1780 riots that hit London during the American War of Independence. Henri Félix Emmanuel Philippoteaux showed the life of Frederick Ponsonby being saved by a French officer at the Battle of Waterloo. While On the Evening of the Battle of Waterloo by Ernest Crofts shows Napoleon abandoning his carriage in the wake of his defeat.

== Gallery ==
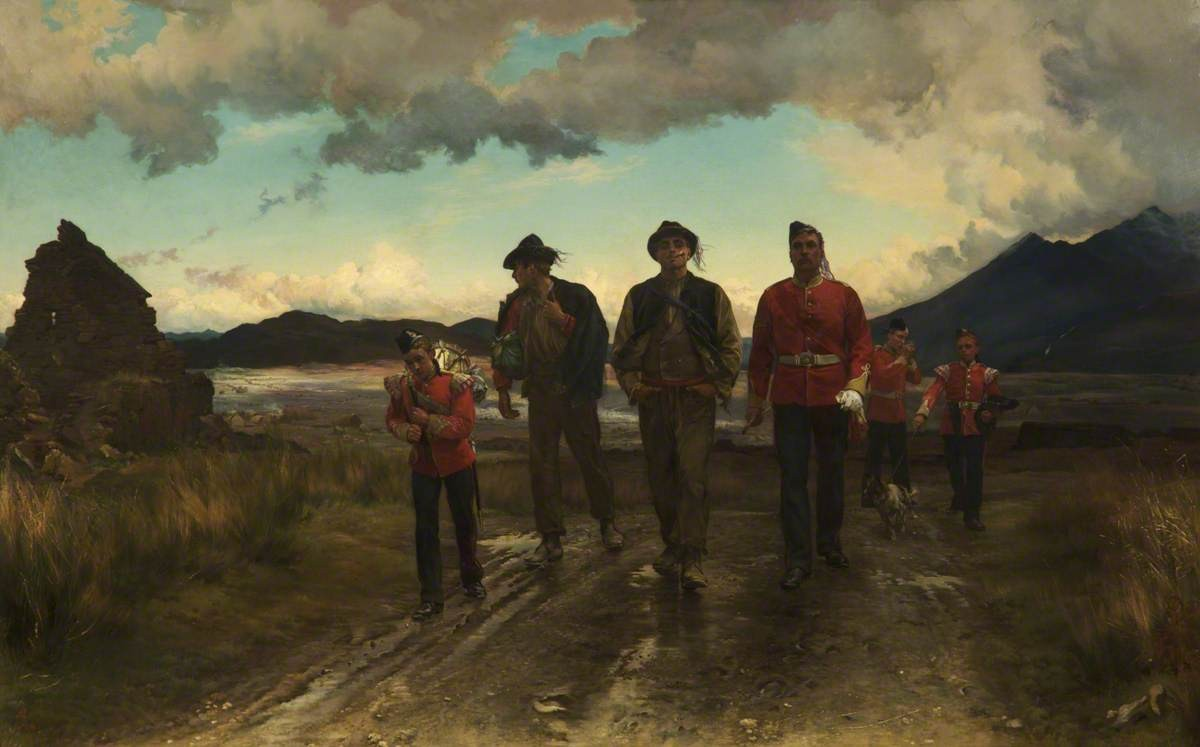
Listed for the Connaught Rangers by Elizabeth Thompson

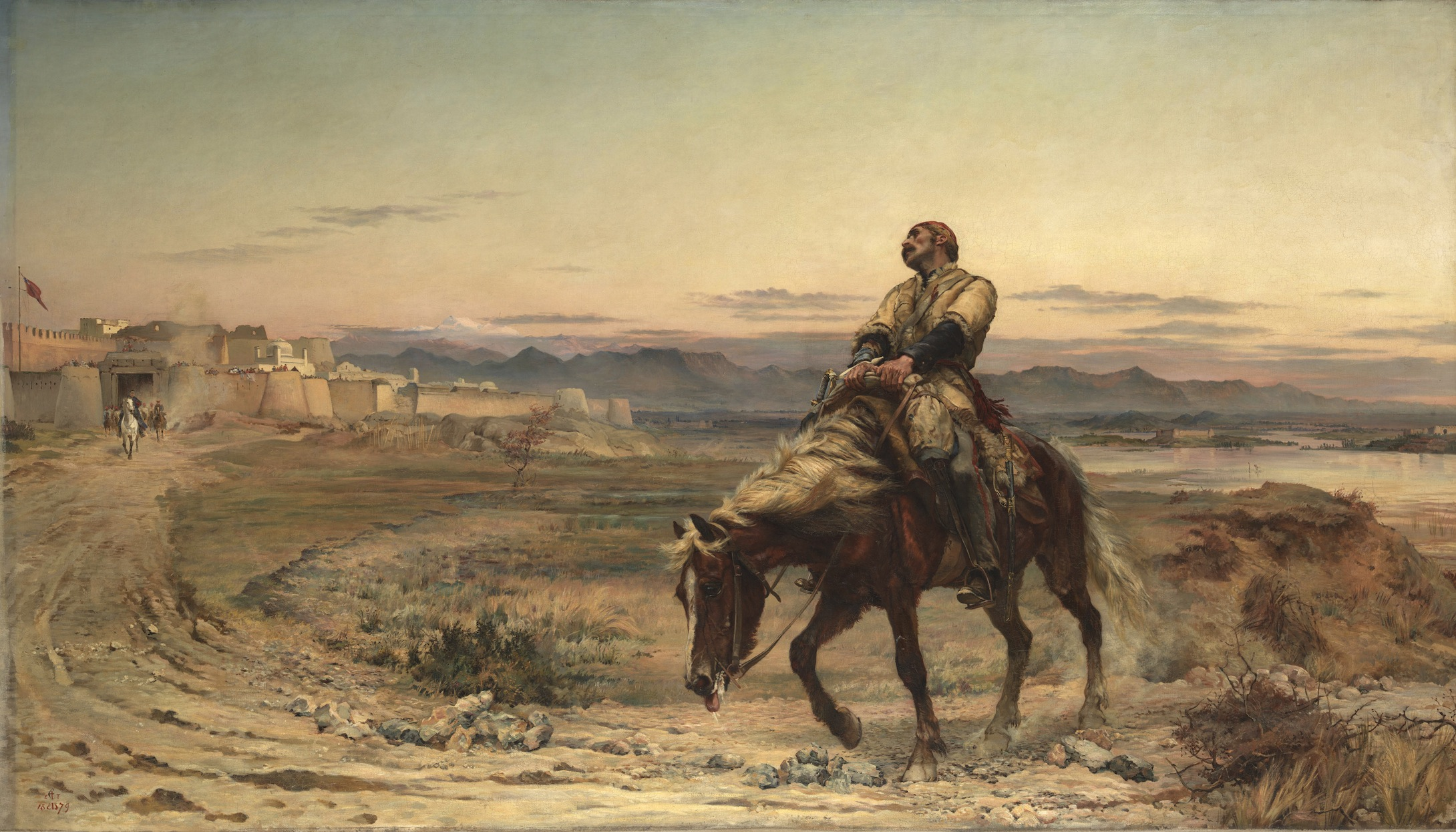
Remnants of an Army by Elizabeth Thompson

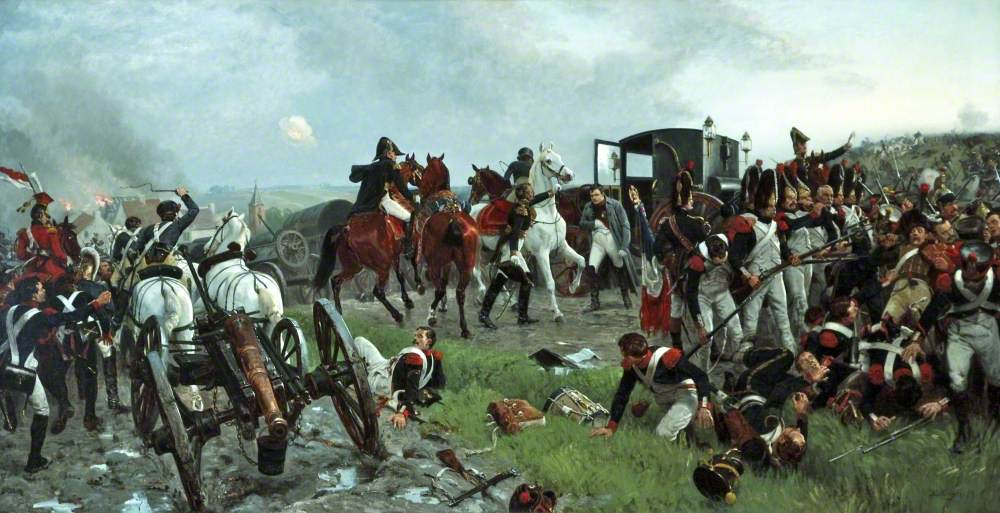
On the Evening of the Battle of Waterloo by Ernest Crofts

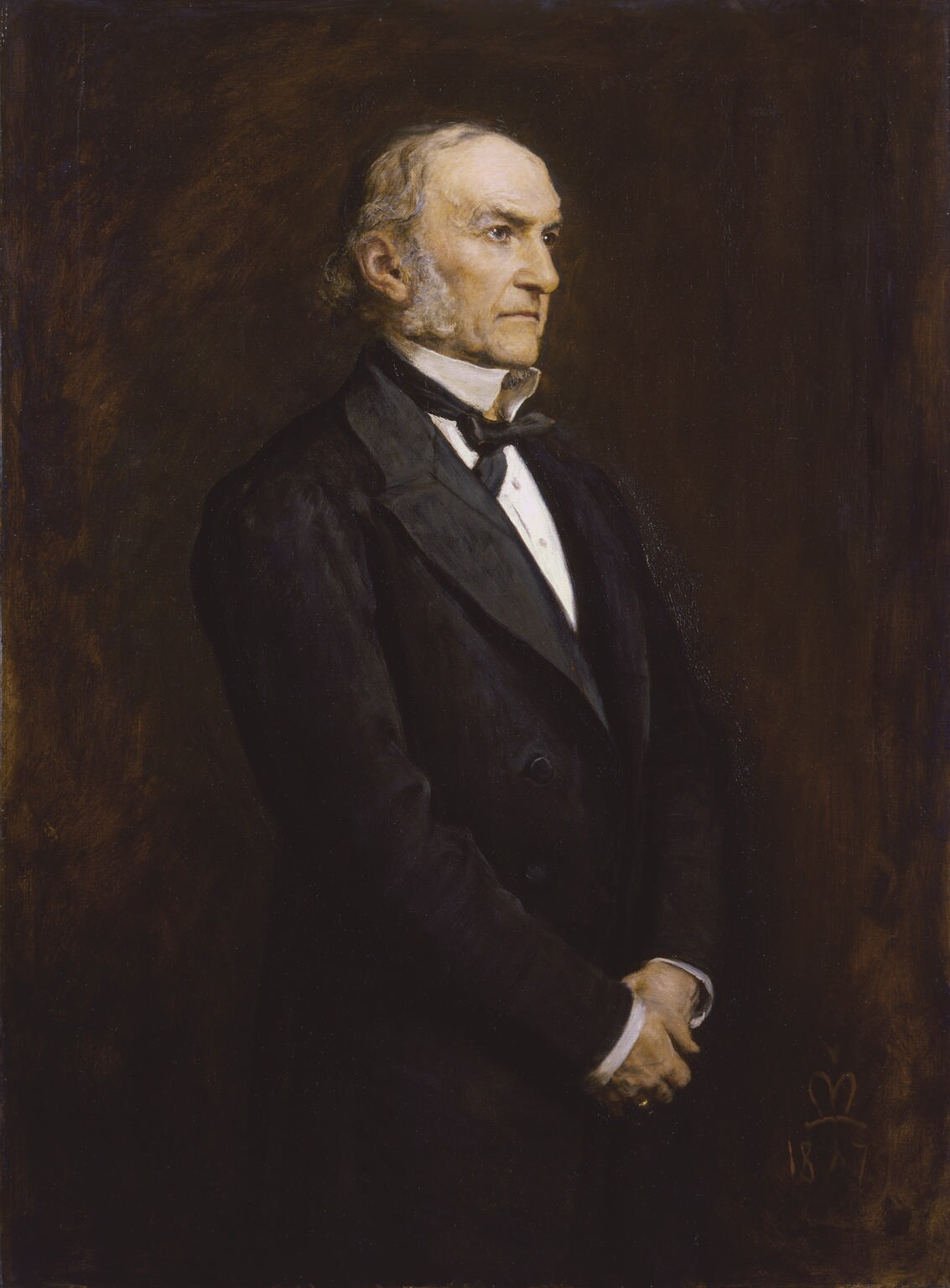
Portrait of William Ewart Gladstone by John Everett Millais

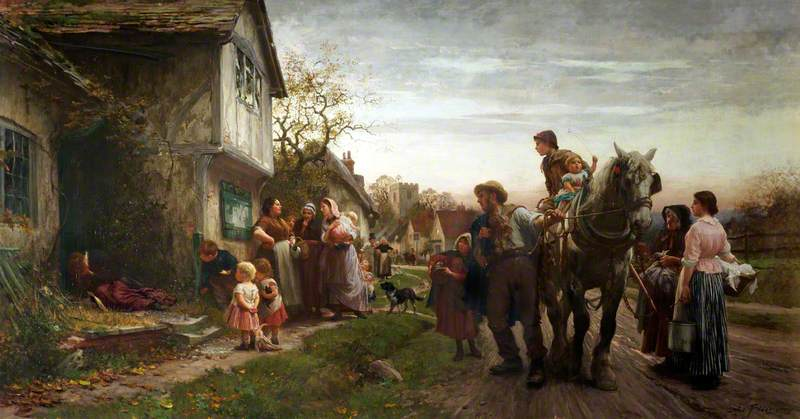
The Penitent's Return by Luke Fildes

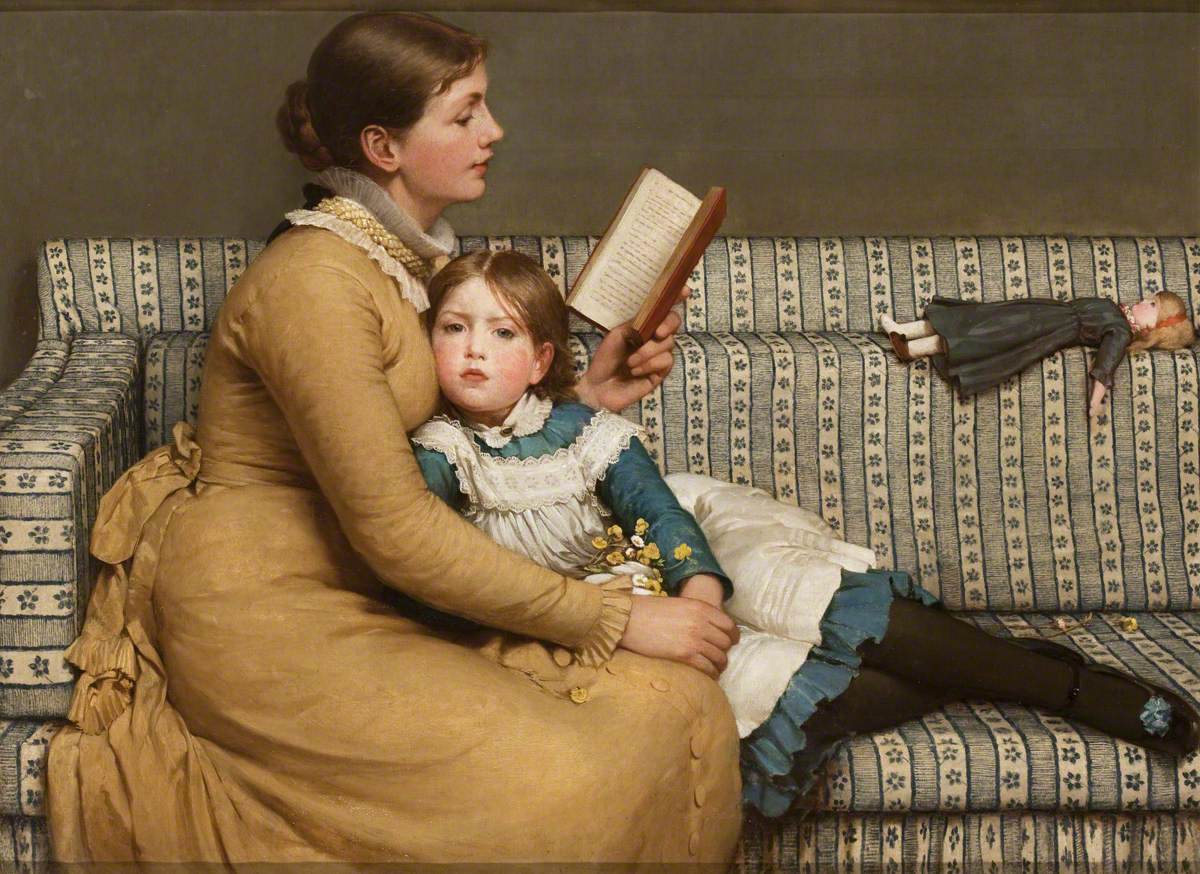
Alice in Wonderland by George Dunlop Leslie

Waiting for the blessing of Pope Pius IX at St John Lateran, Rome by Keeley Halswelle

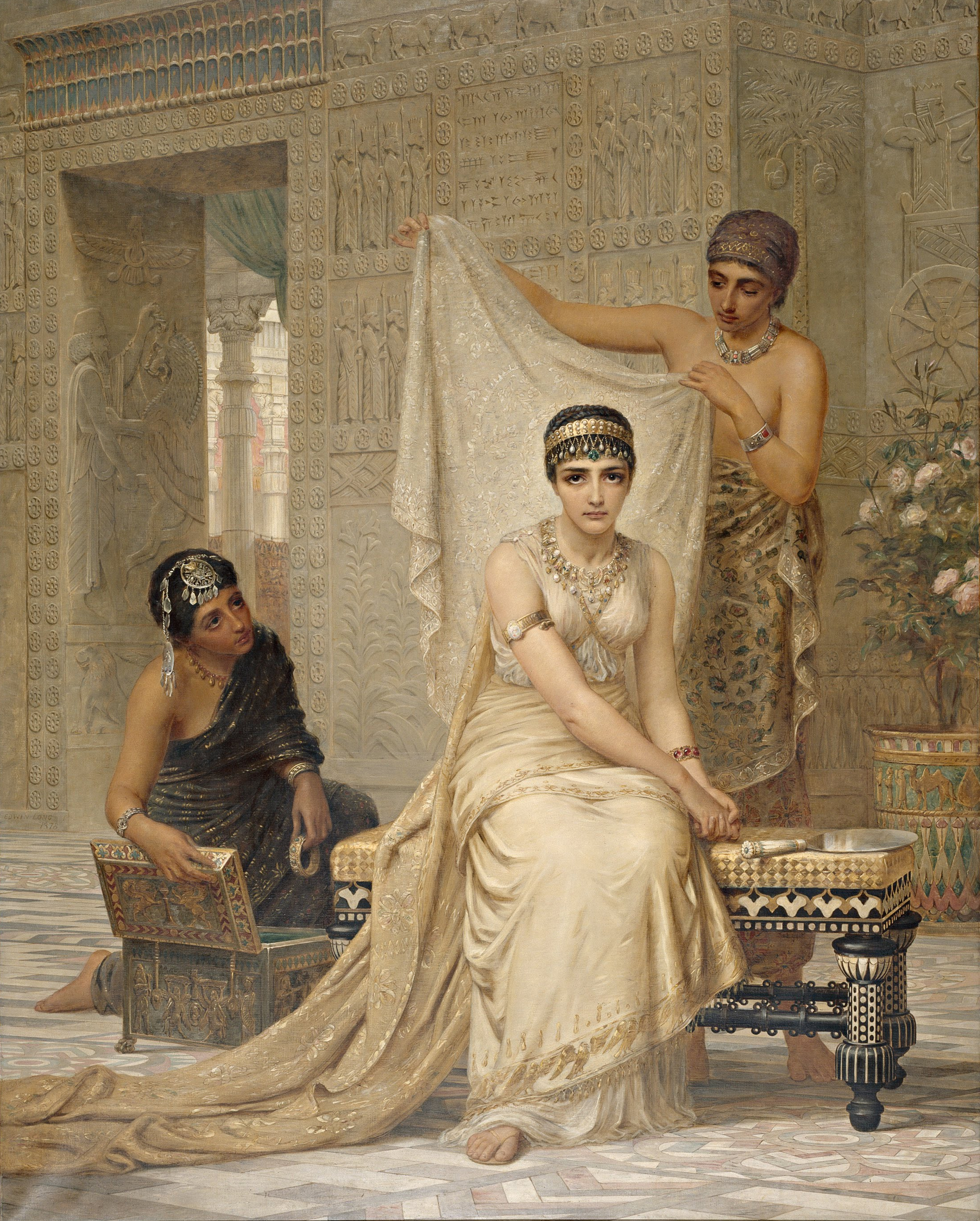
Queen Esther by Edwin Long

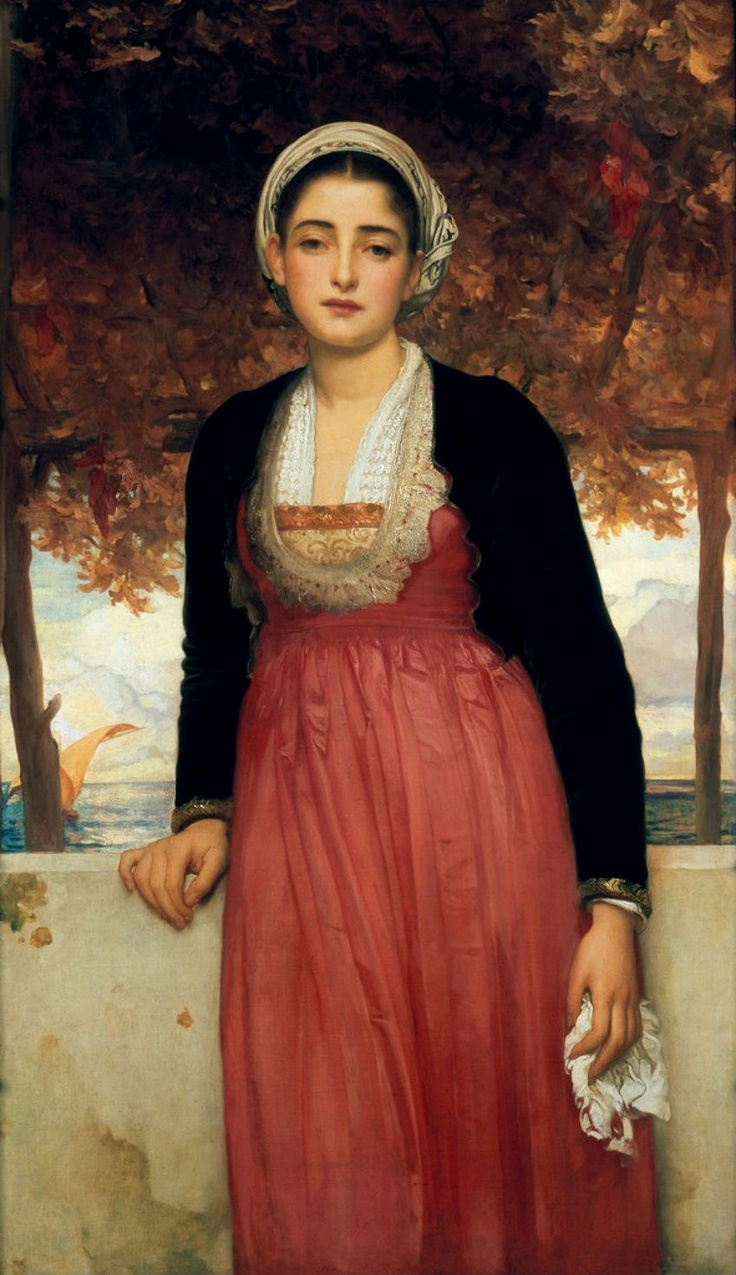
Amarilla by Frederic Leighton

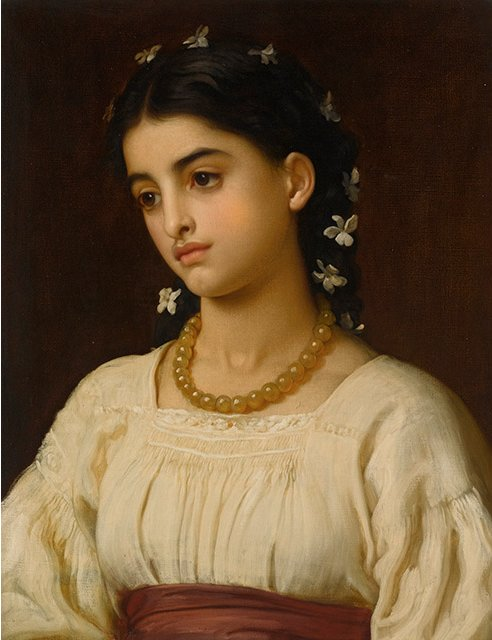
Catarina by Frederic Leighton

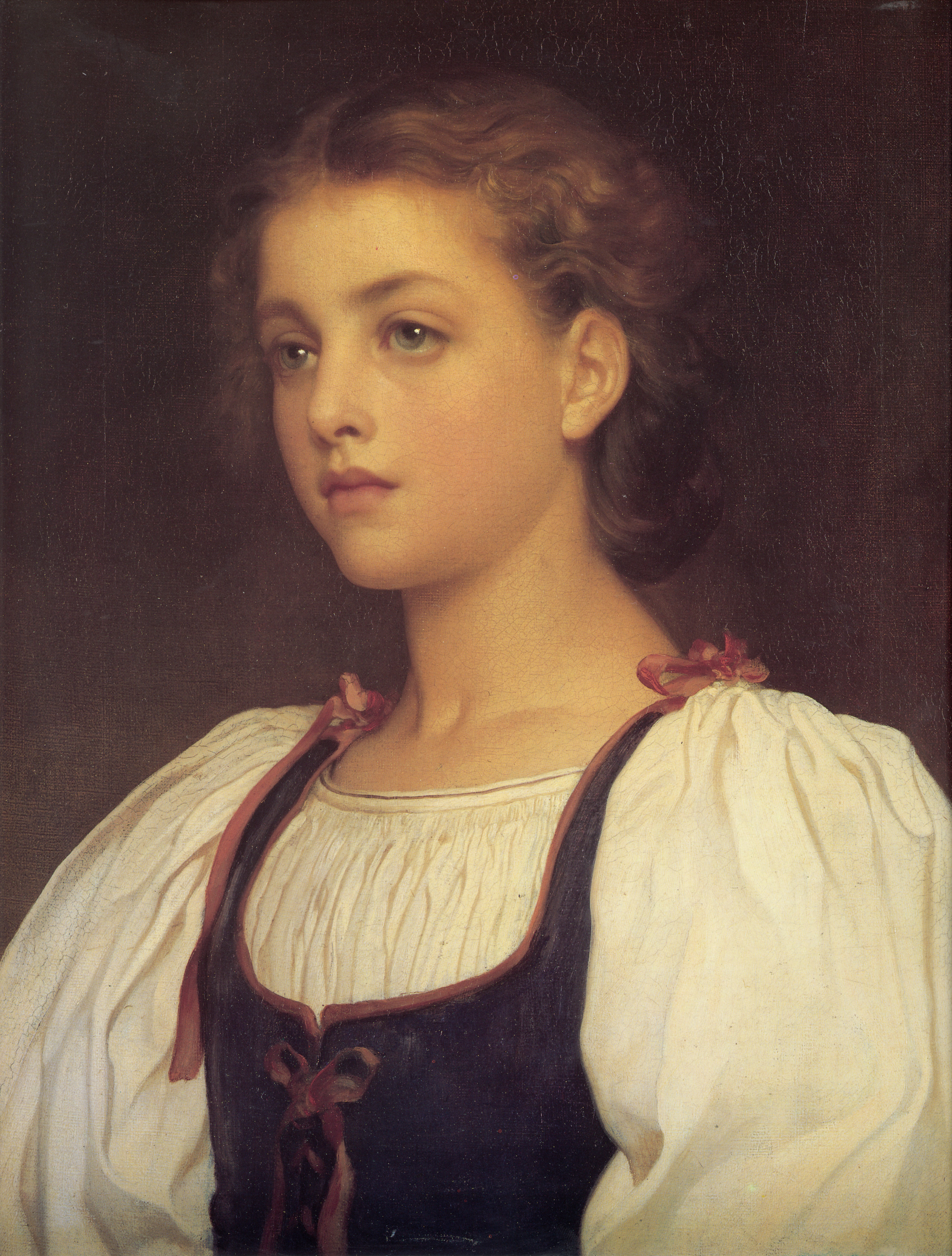
Biondina by Frederic Leighton

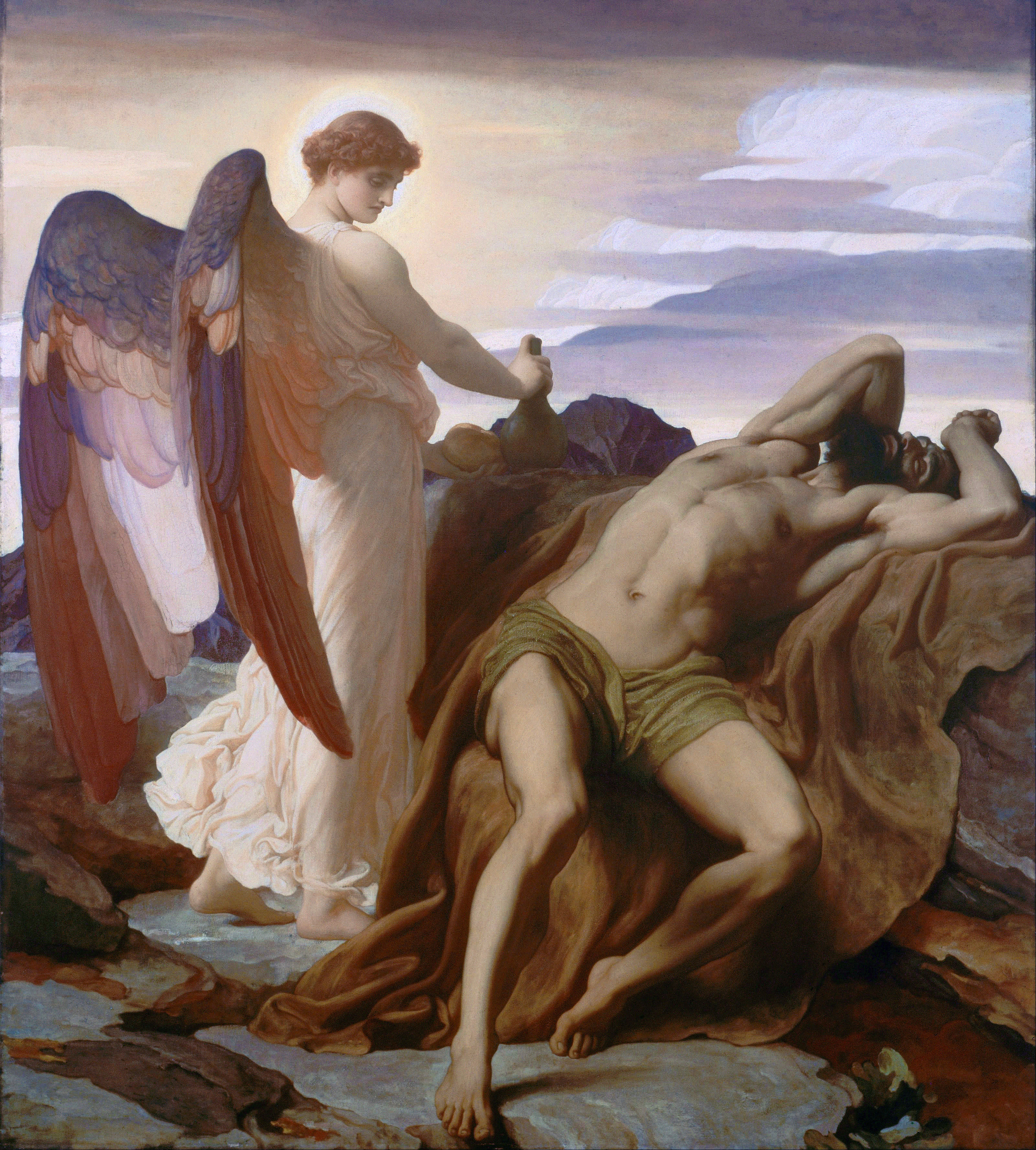
Elijah in the Wilderness by Frederic Leighton

Football by William Barnes Wollen

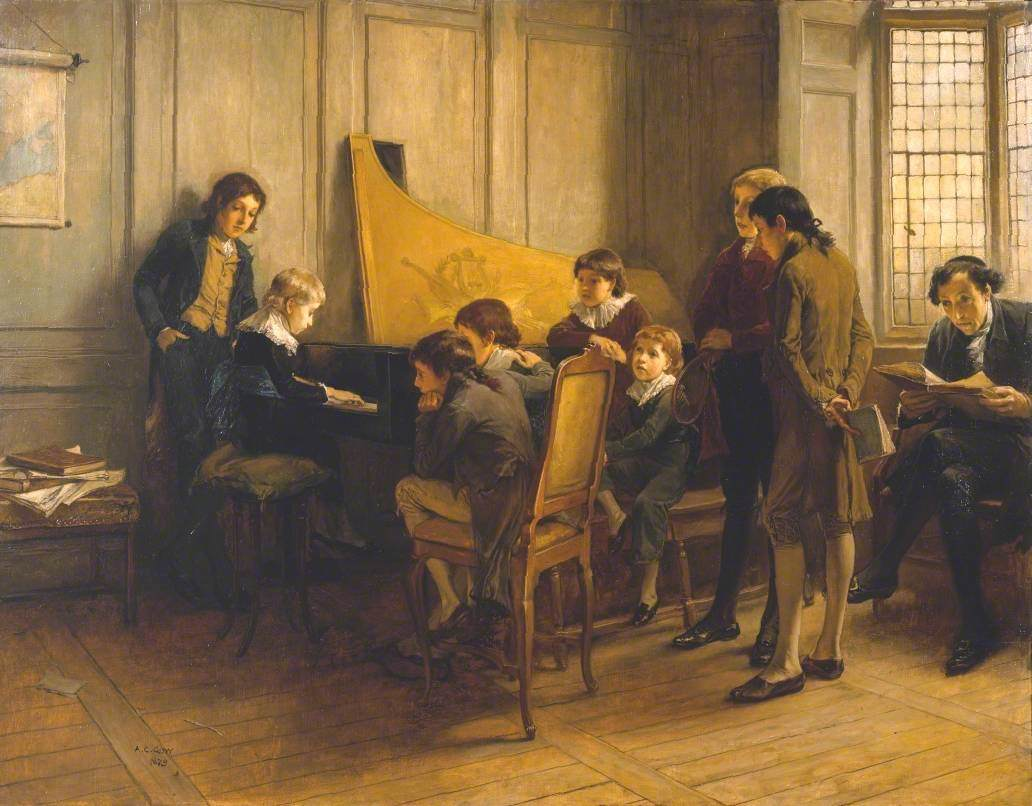
A Musical Story by Chopin by Andrew Carrick Gow

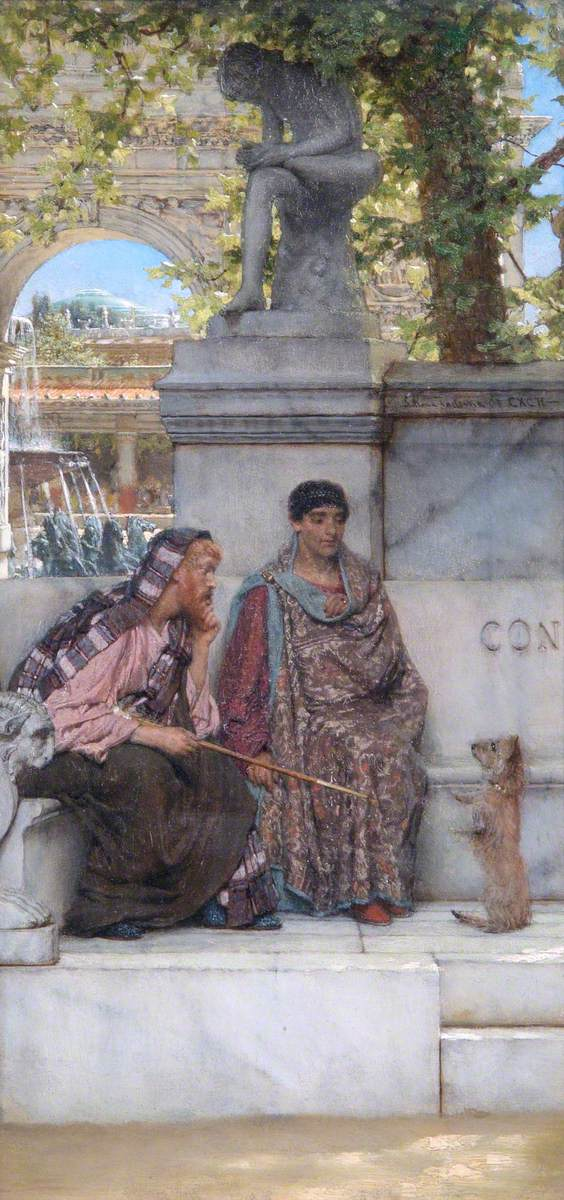
In the Time of Constantine by Lawrence Alma-Tadema

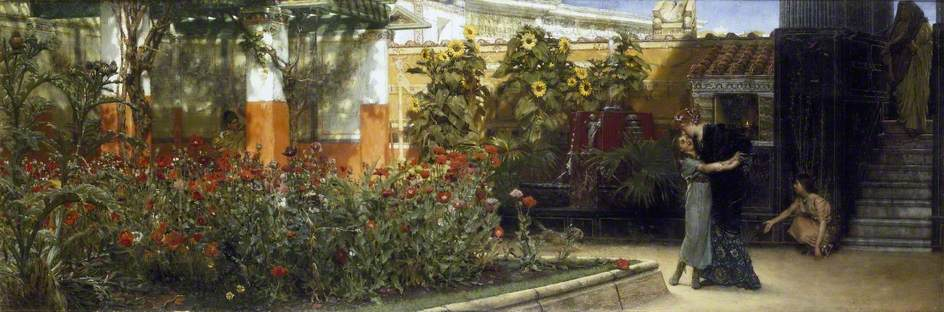
A Hearty Welcome by Lawrence Alma-Tadema

Pomona Festival by Lawrence Alma-Tadema

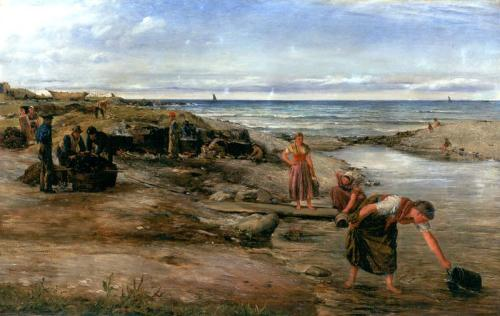
Tanning Nets by James Clarke Hook

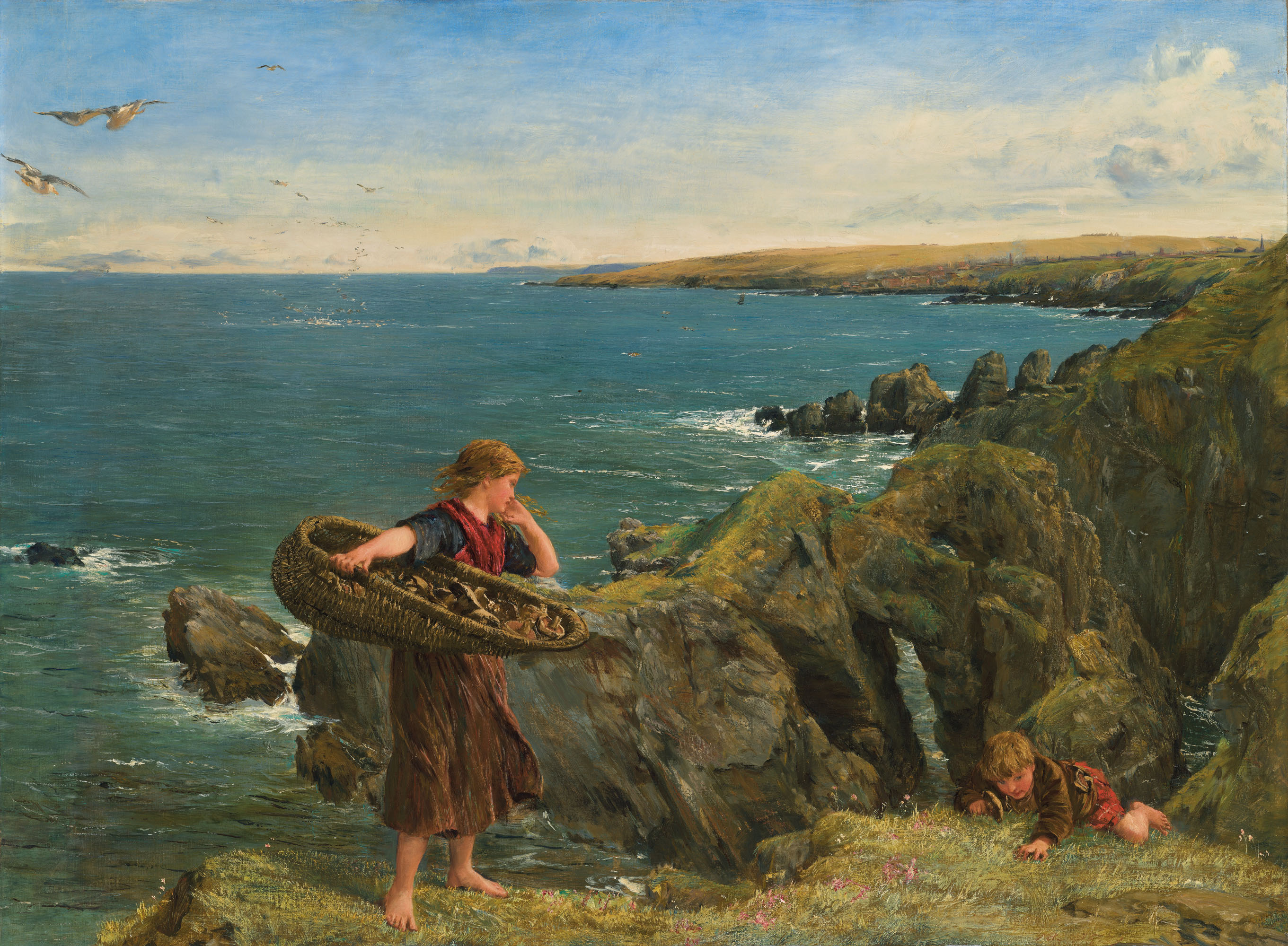
The Mushroom Gatherers by James Clarke Hook

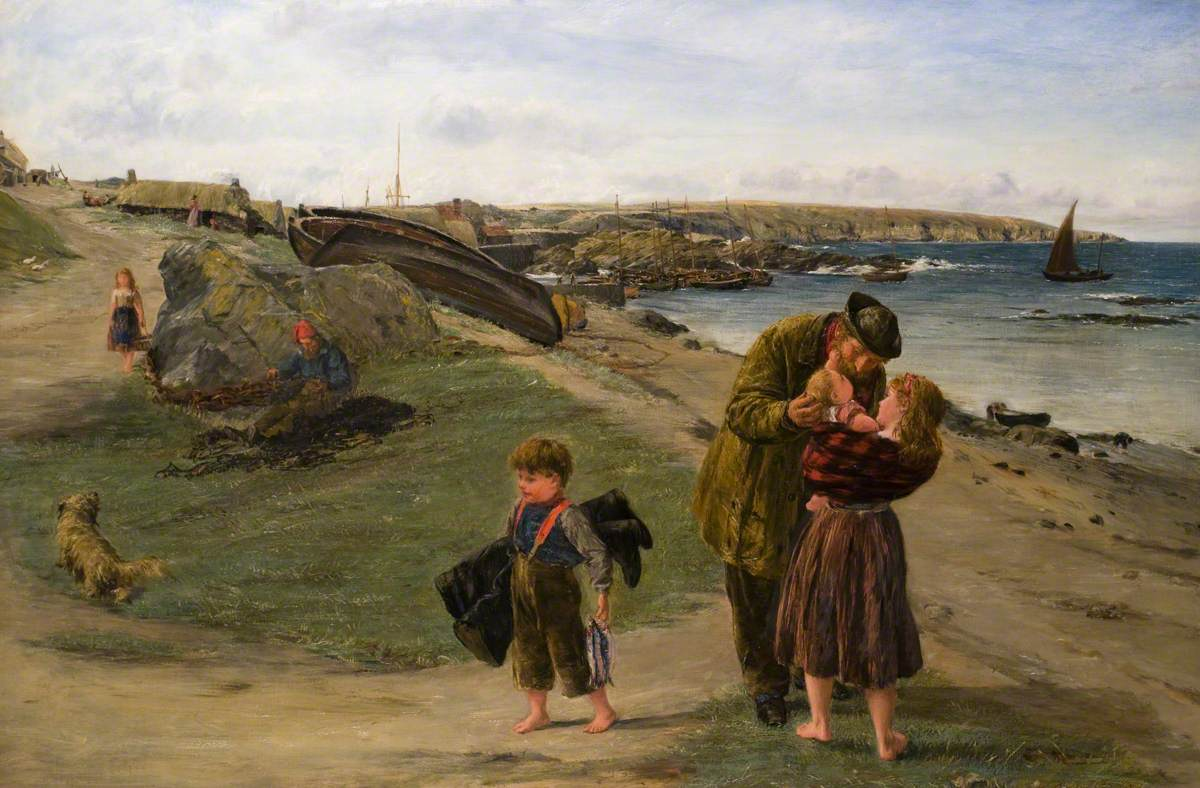
Little to Earn and Many to Keep by James Clarke Hook

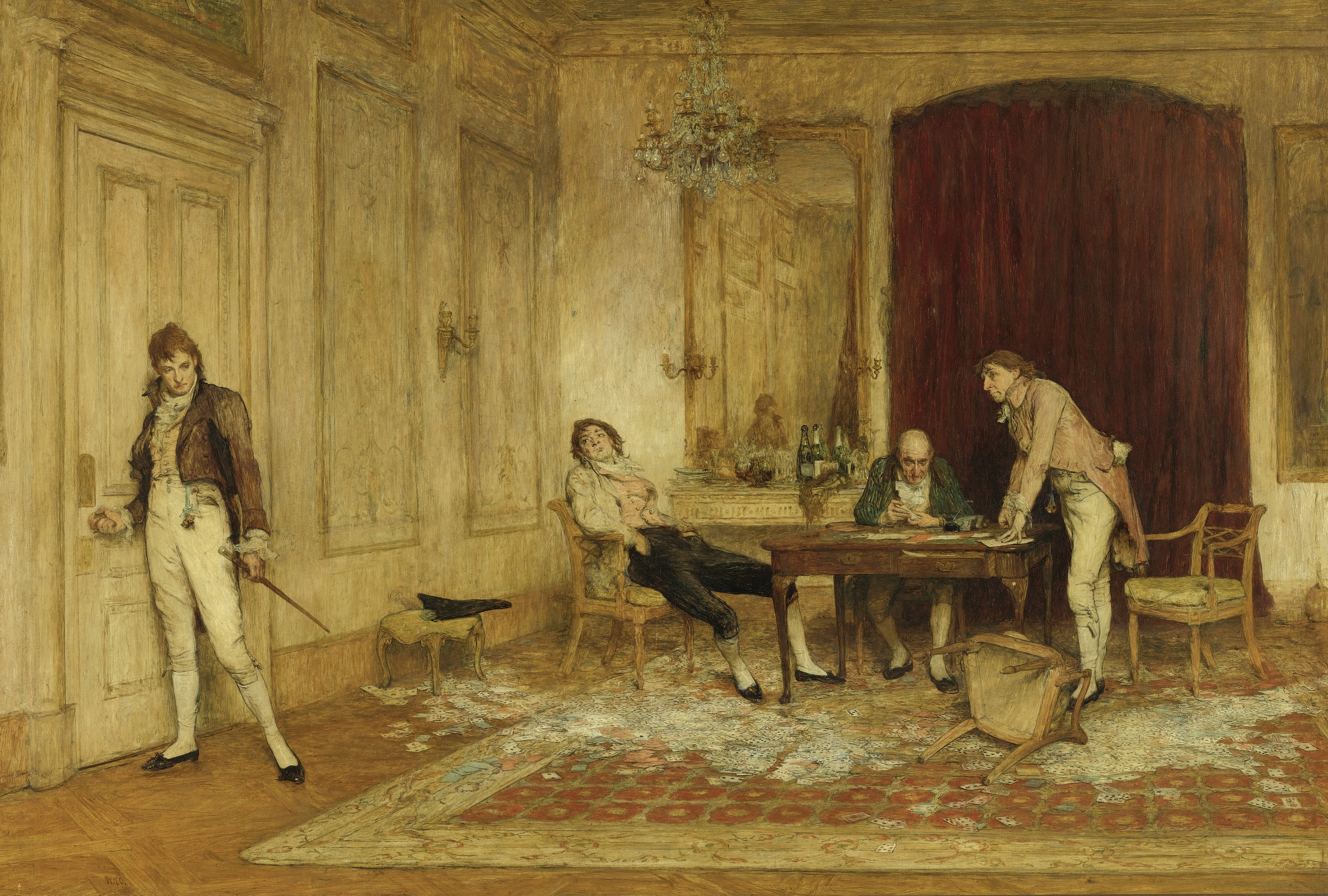
Hard Hit! by William Quiller Orchardson

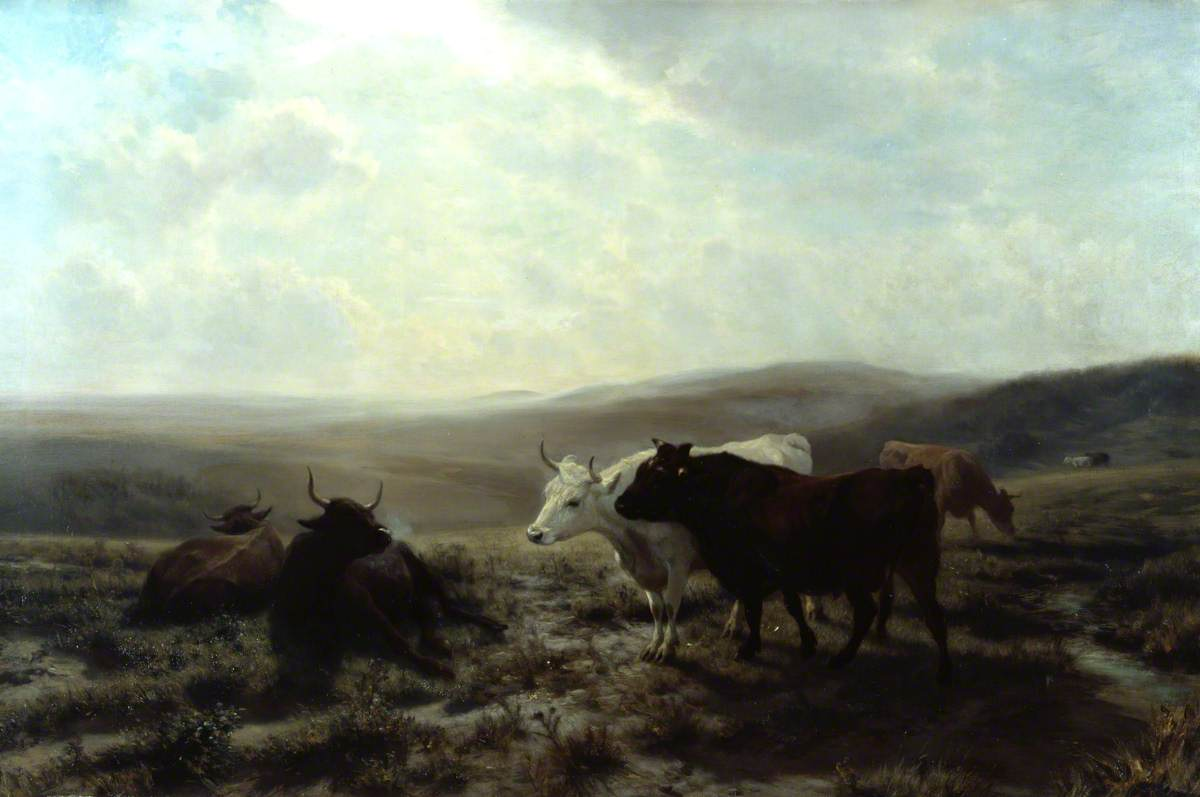
A Midsummer Night by Henry William Banks Davis

No Surrender by Andrew Carrick Gow

A Greek Ode by Alfred Elmore

The Proposal of the Jews to Ferdinand and Isabella by Solomon Hart

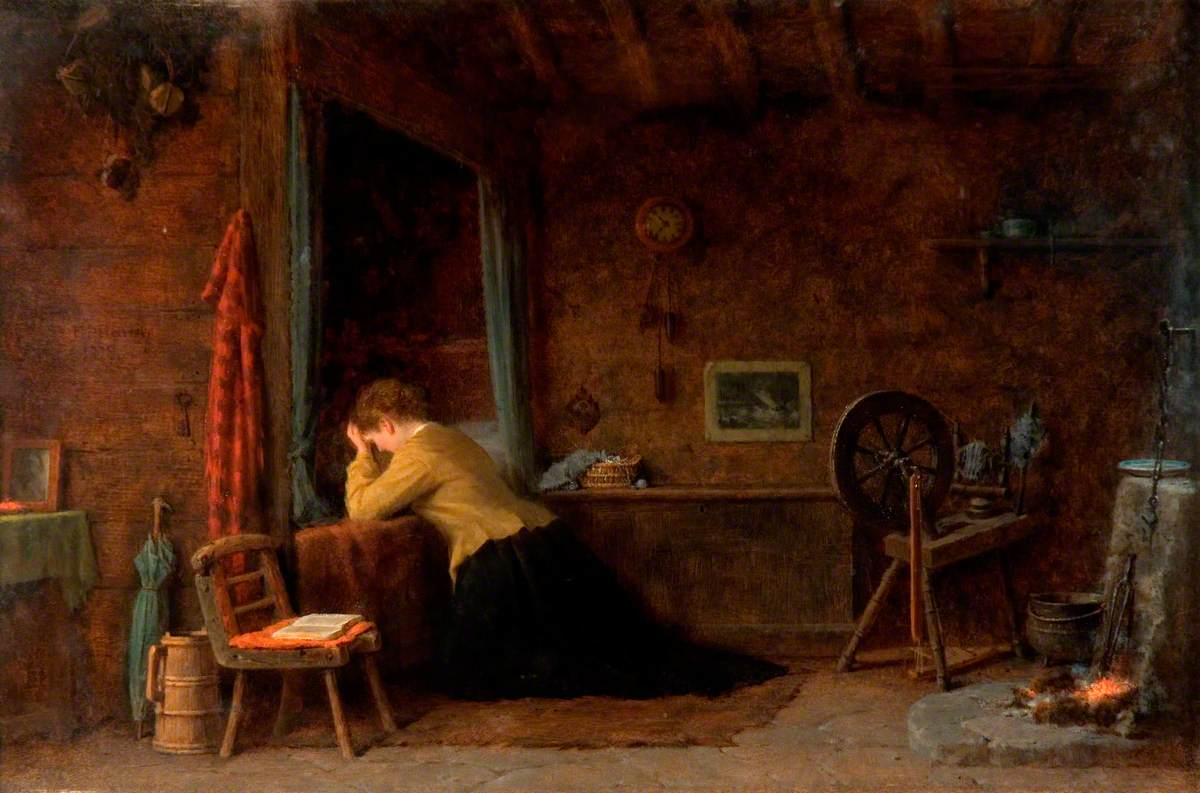
A Prayer for those at Sea by Frederick Daniel Hardy

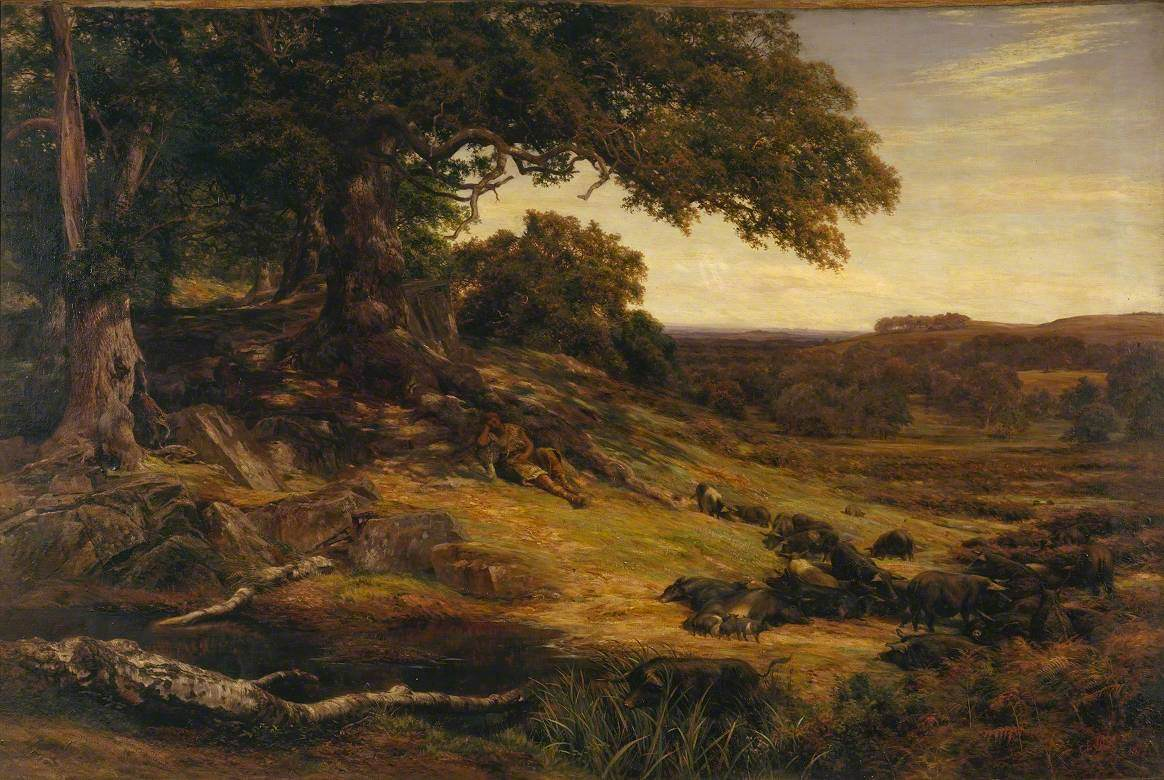
The Swineherd, Gurth, Son of Beowulph by Charles Edward Johnson

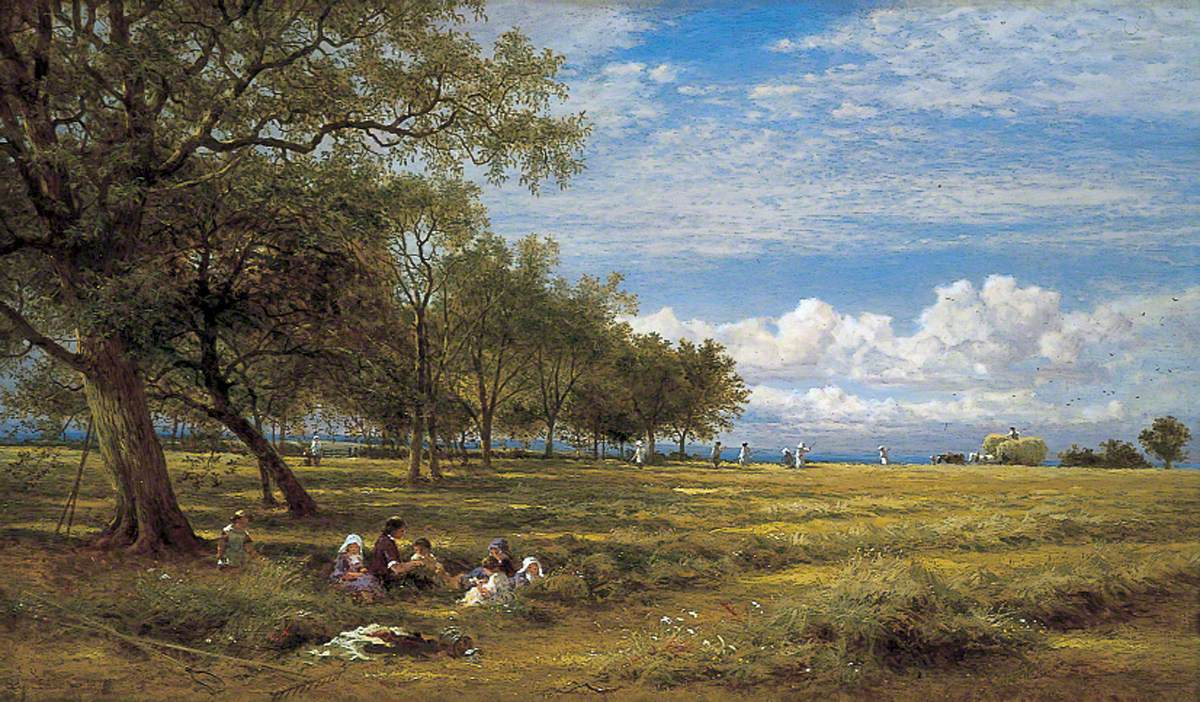
An English Hayfield by Benjamin Williams Leader

The Waning of the Year by Ernest Parton

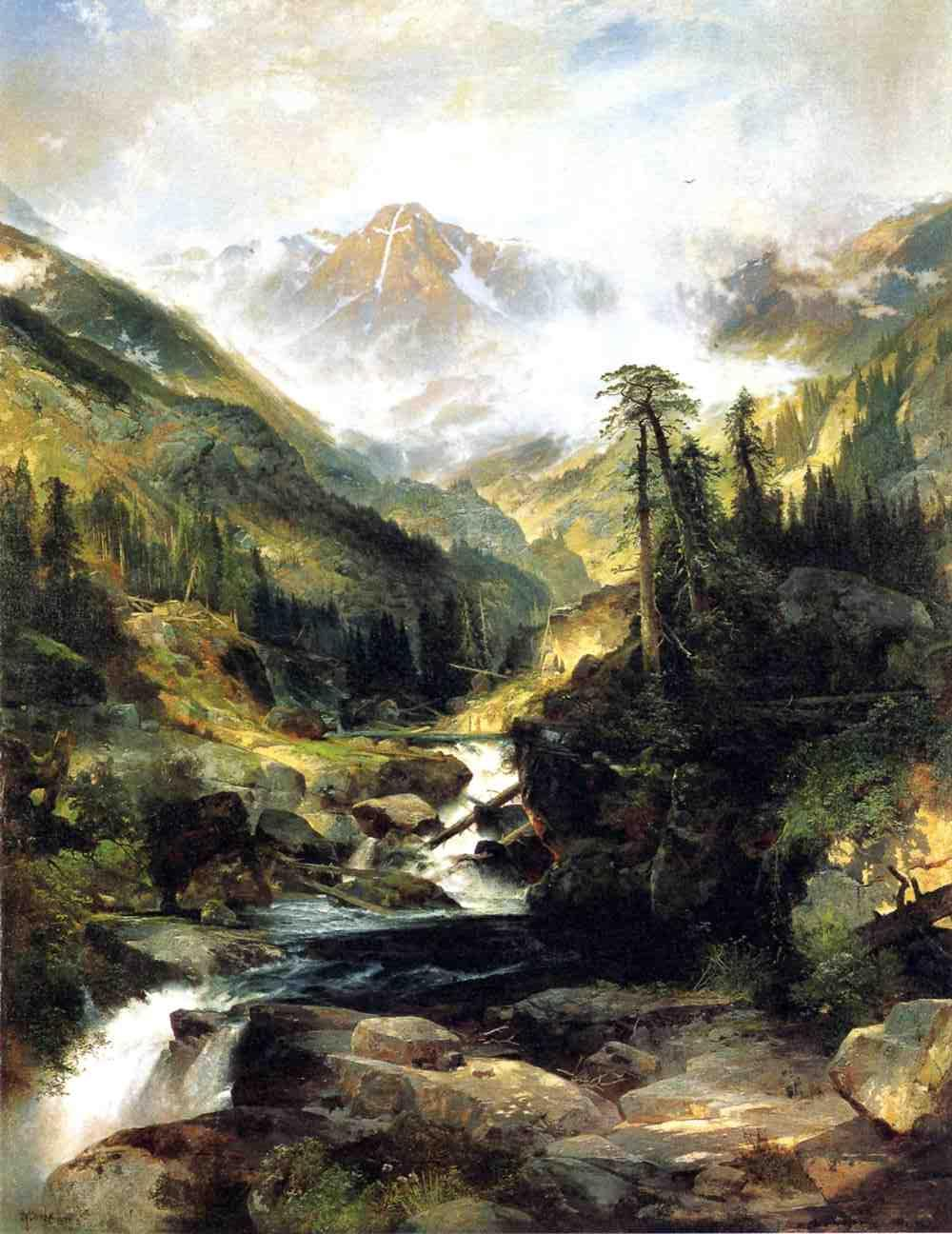
Mountain of the Holy Cross by Thomas Moran

A Warm Sunny Evening by Thomas Sidney Cooper

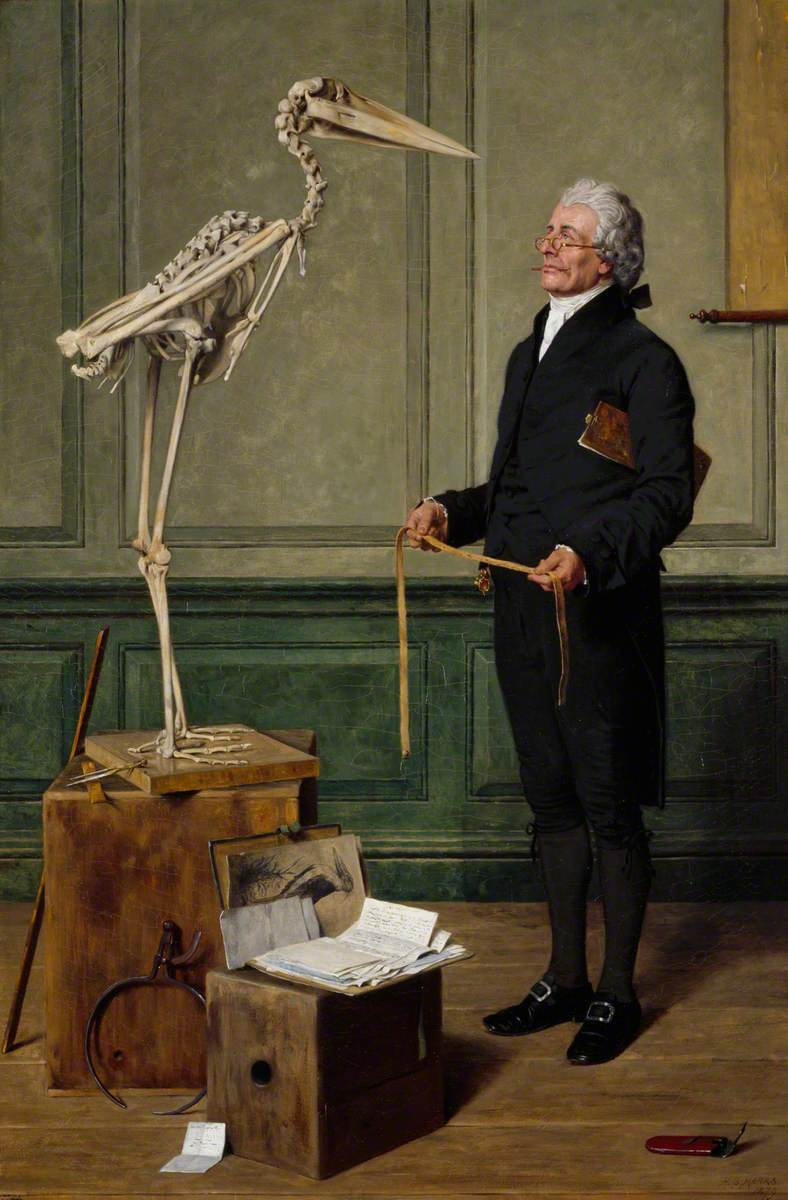
Science is Measurement by Henry Stacy Marks

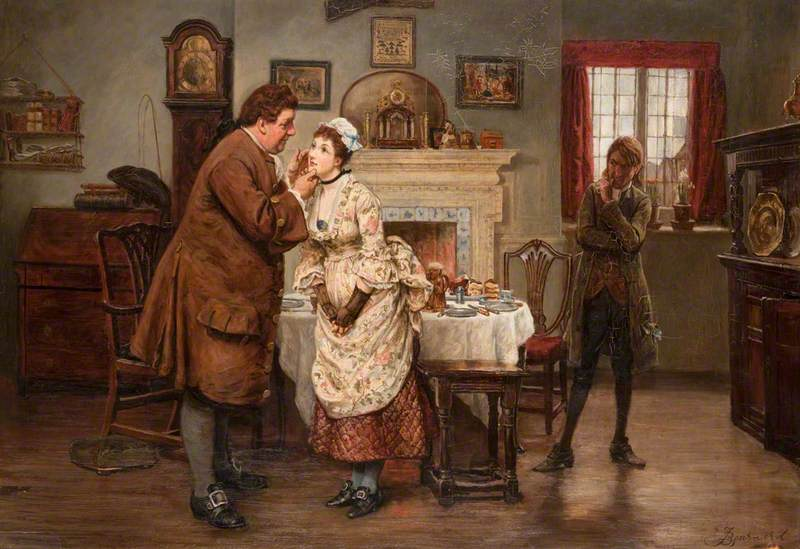
A Scene from Barnaby Rudge by Fred Barnard

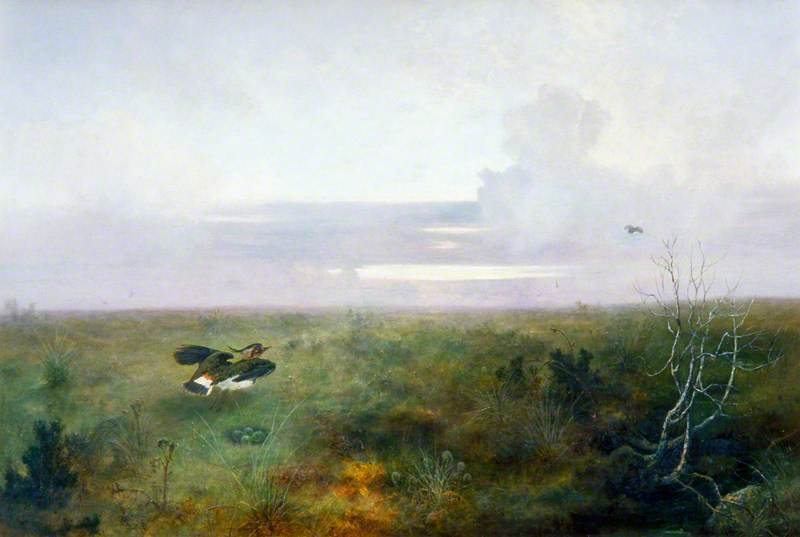
Disturbed, A Plover Rising from Its Nest by John Wright Oakes

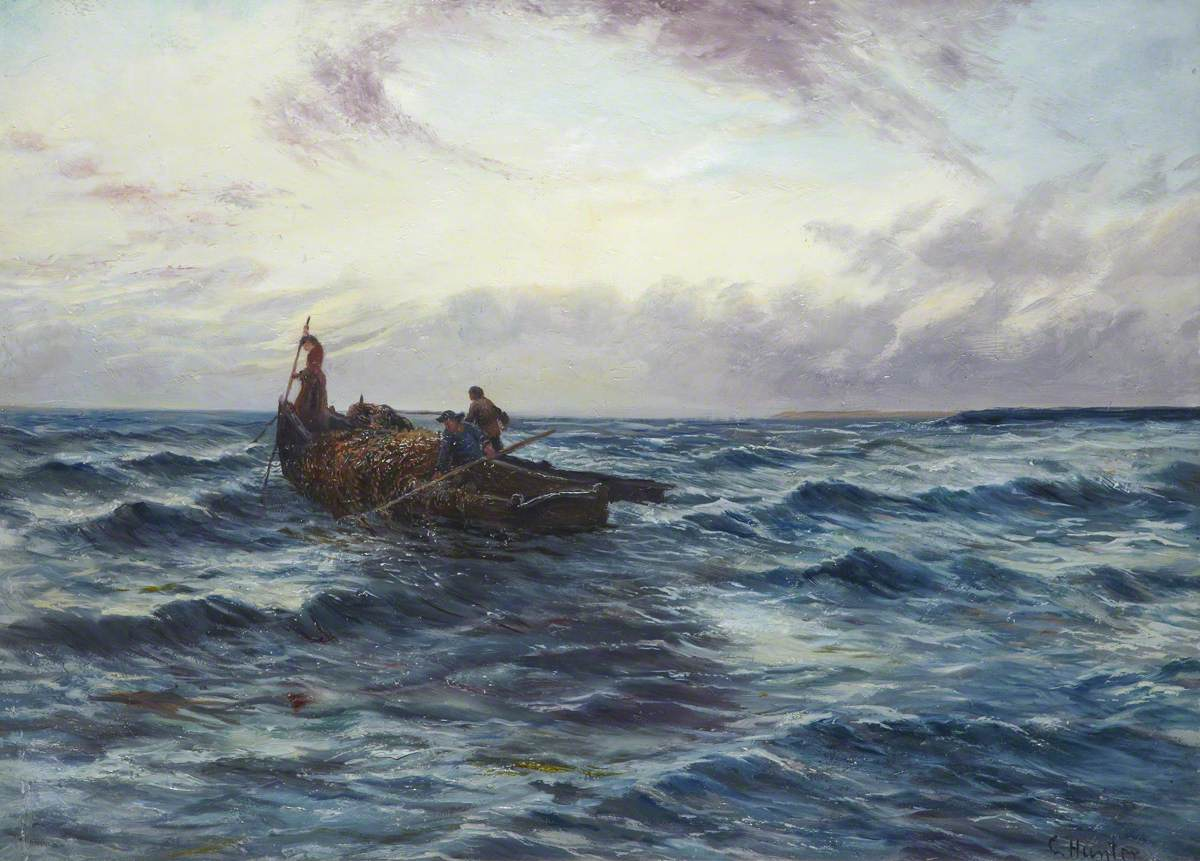
Their Only Harvest by Colin Hunter

In the Shade by Marcus Stone

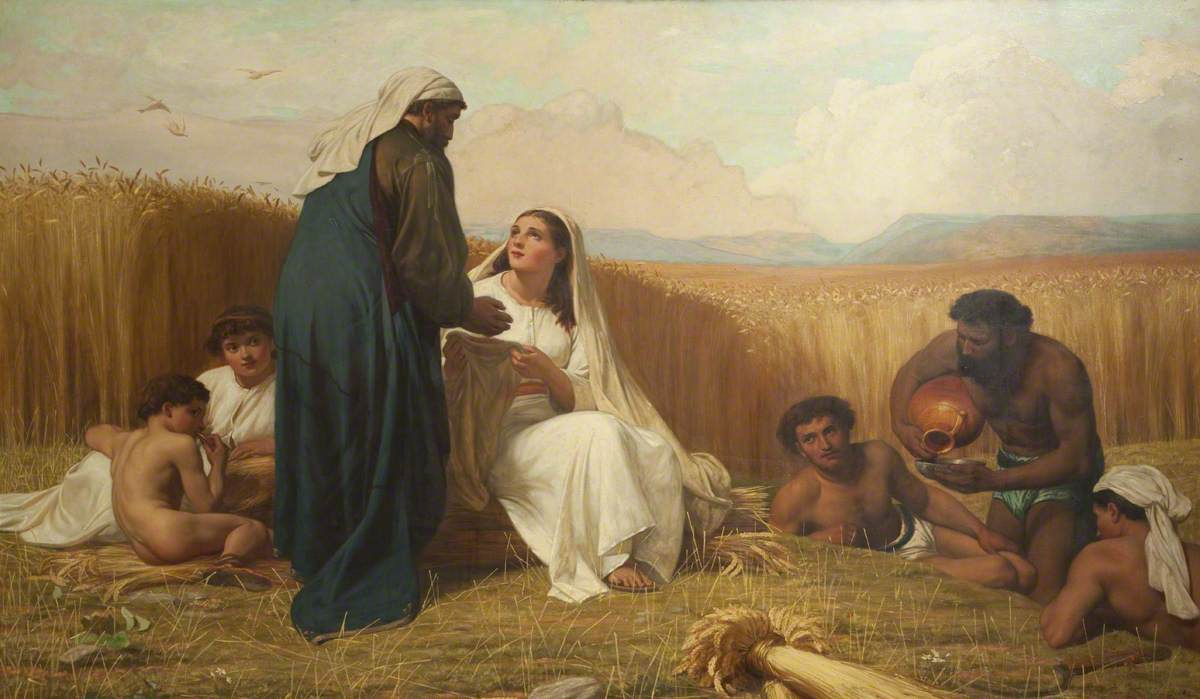
Ruth and Boaz by David Wilkie Wynfield

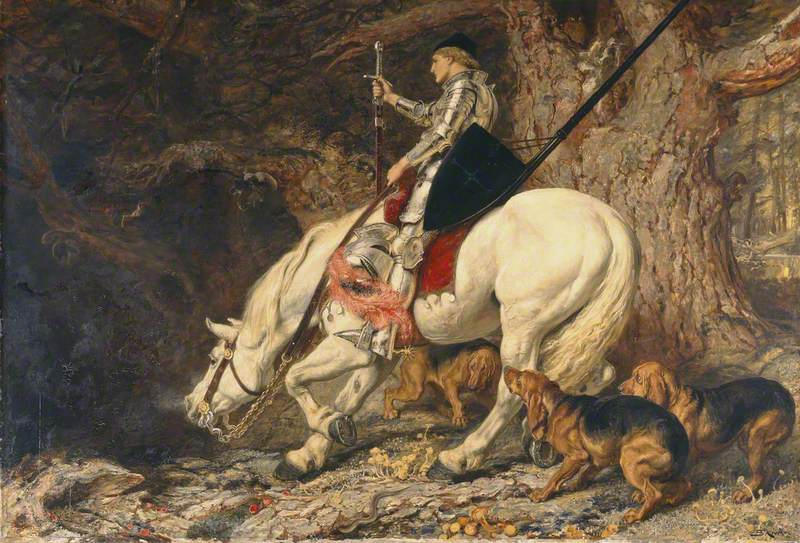
In Manus Tuas, Domine by Briton Riviere

The Prince of Wales Crossing the Sarda by Herbert Johnson

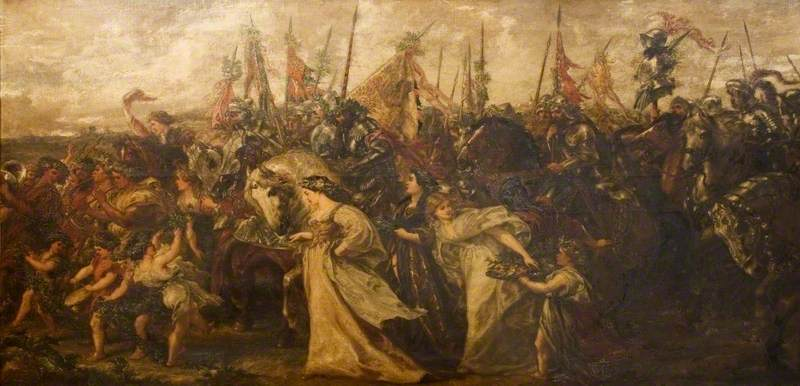
The Return of the Victors by John Gilbert

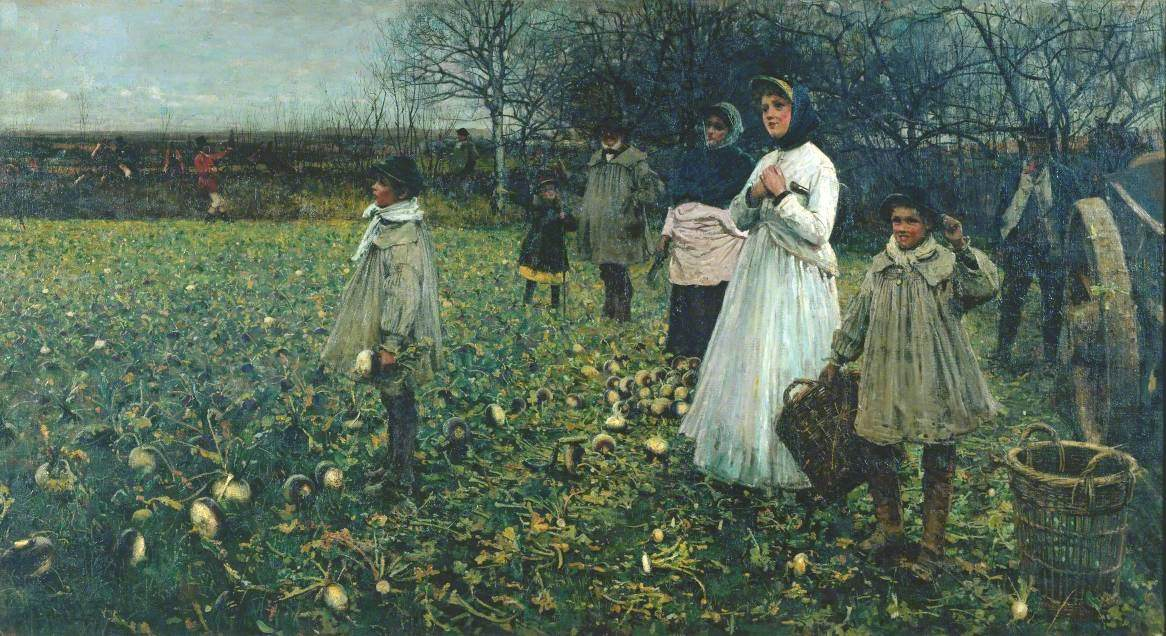
Toil and Pleasure by John Robertson Reid

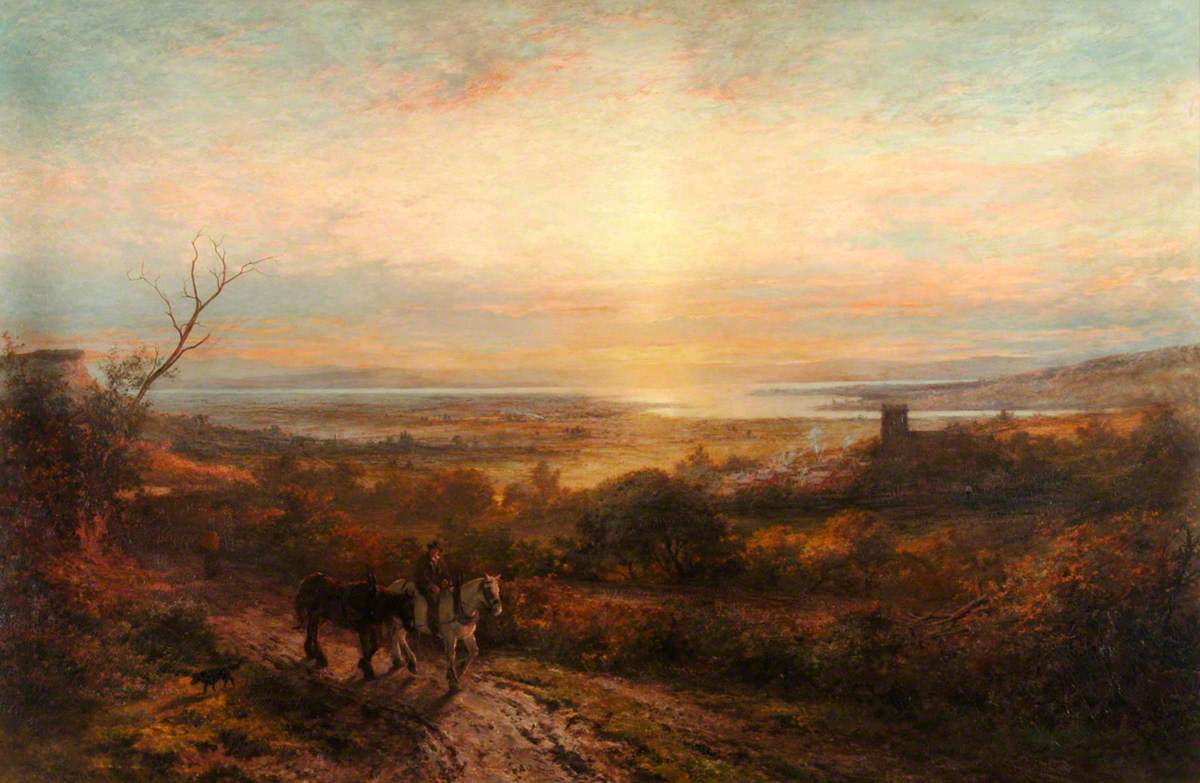
The Meeting of the Mersey and the Weaver by John Finnie

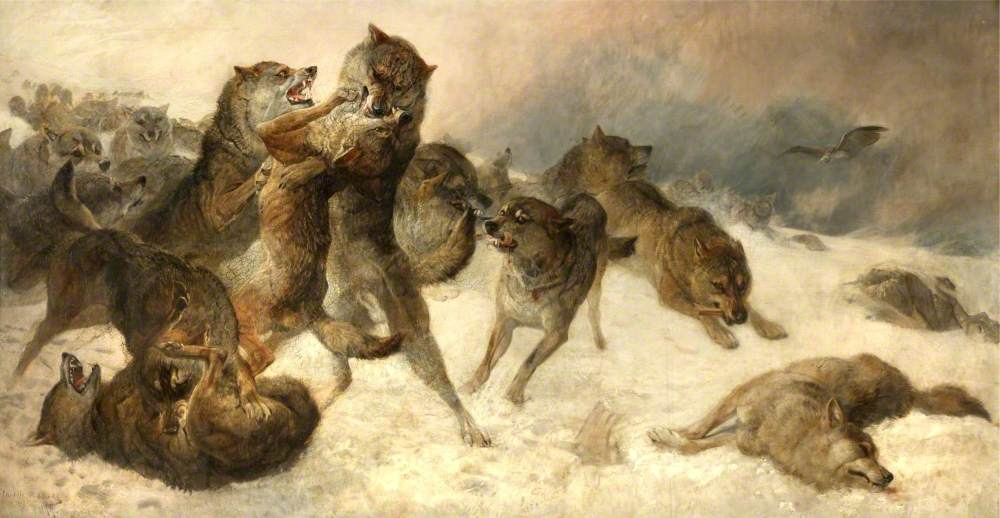
The Struggle for Existence by George Bouverie Goddard

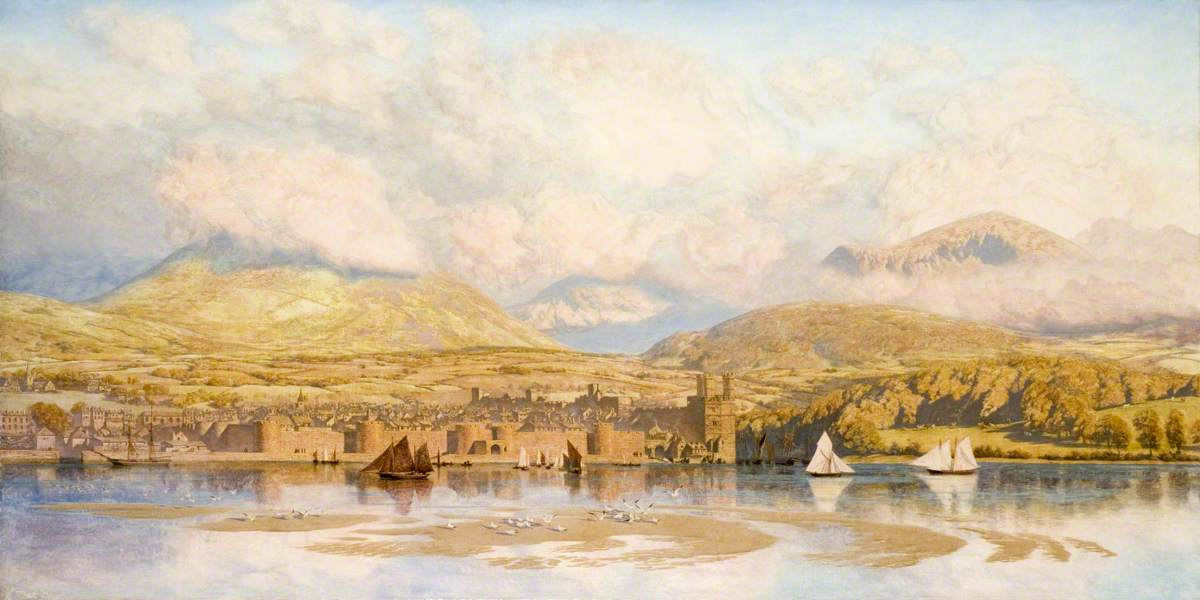
The Stronghold of the Seison by John Brett

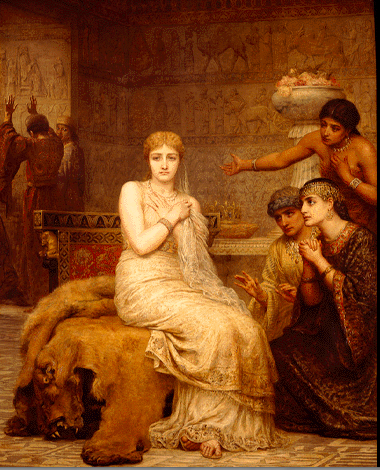
Vashti by Edwin Long

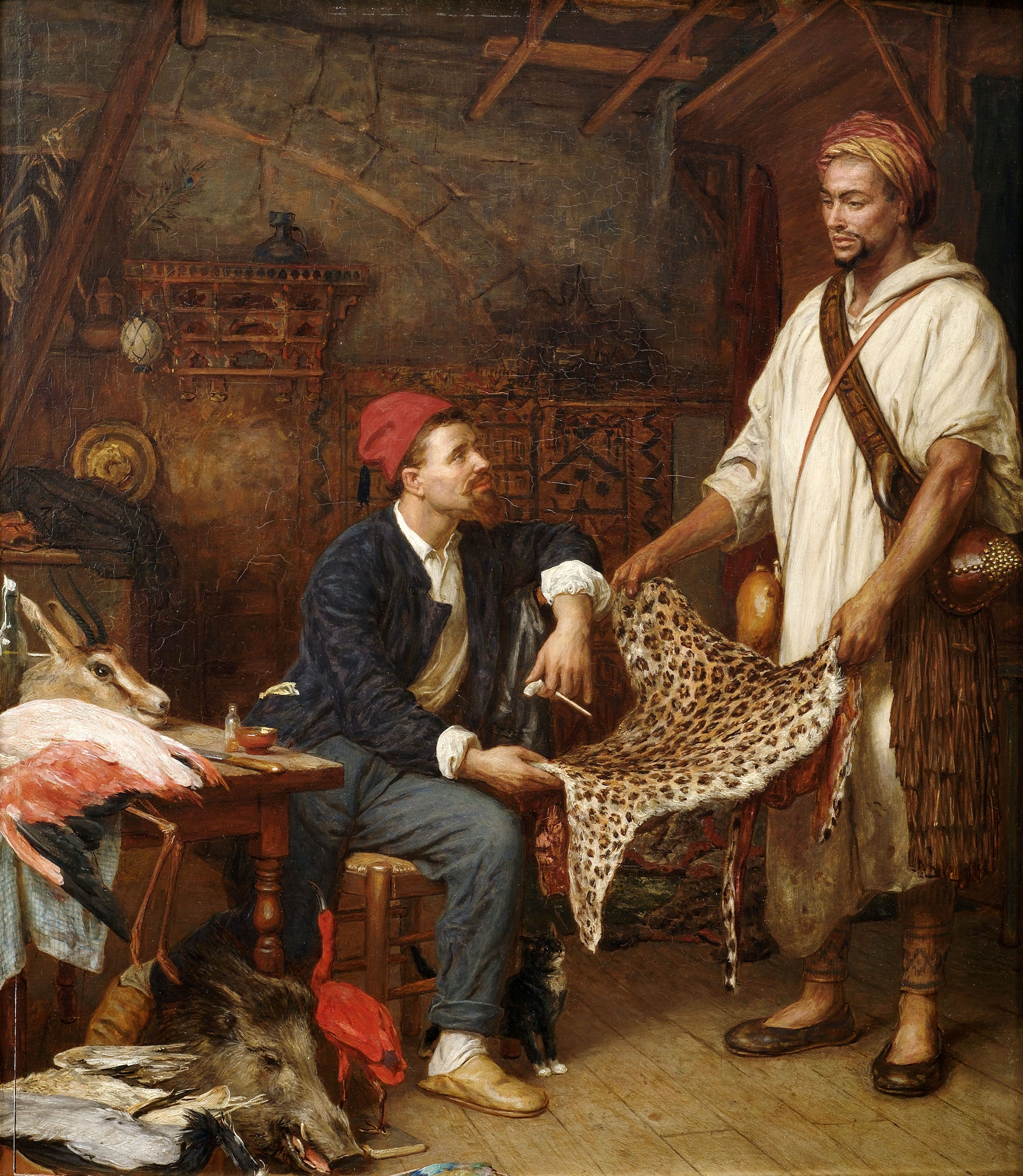
The French Naturalist in Algiers by John Evan Hodgson

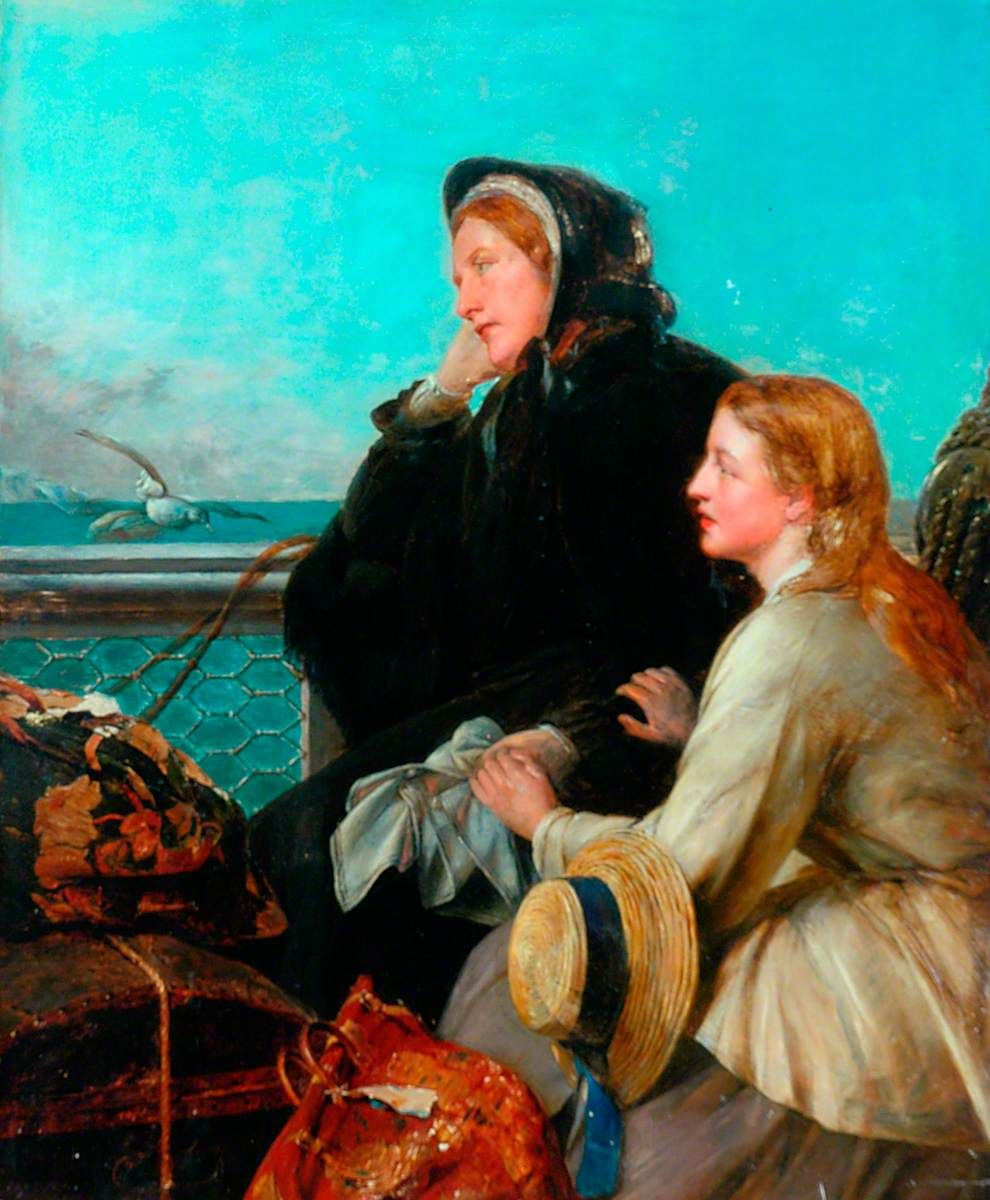
My Native Land, Goodbye by Henry Nelson O'Neil

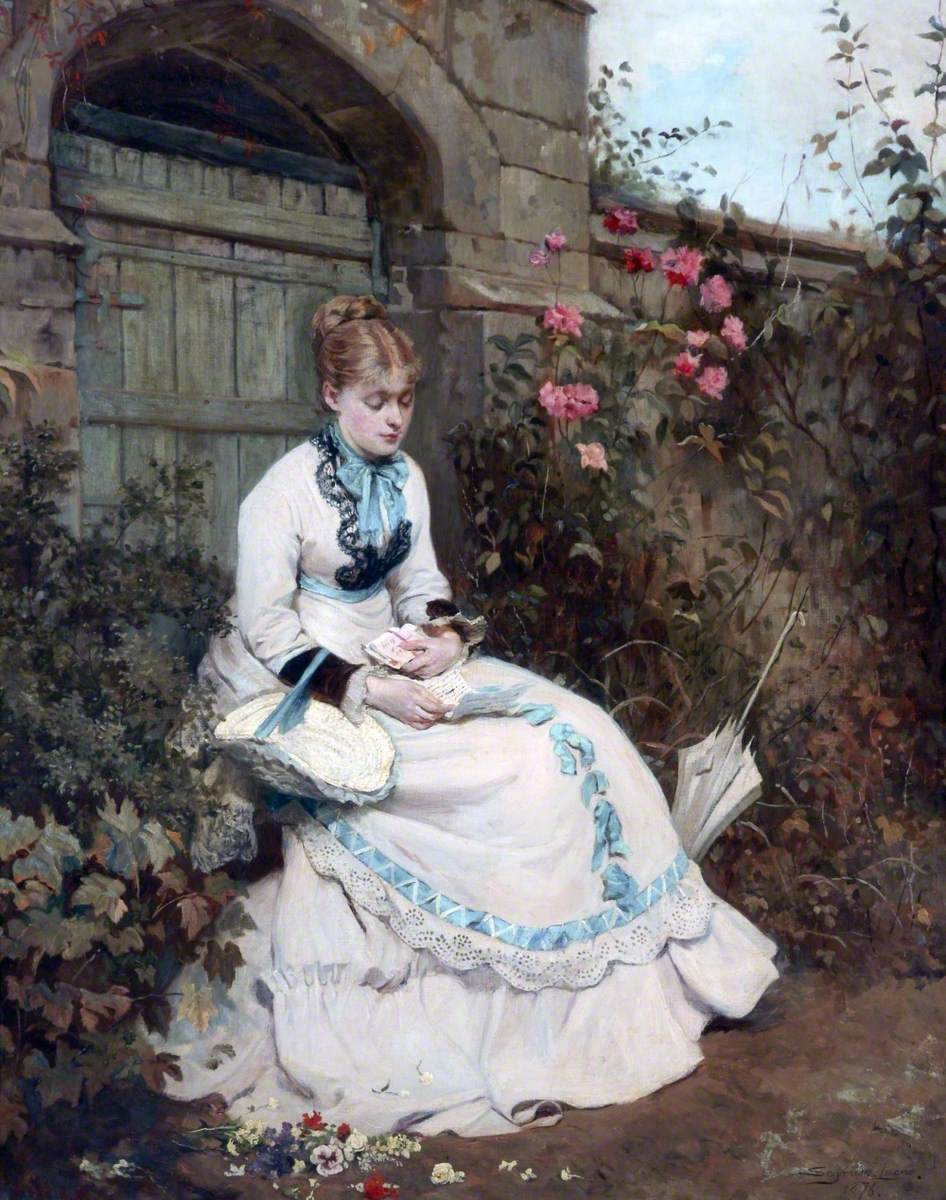
Unbreathed Memories by John Seymour Lucas

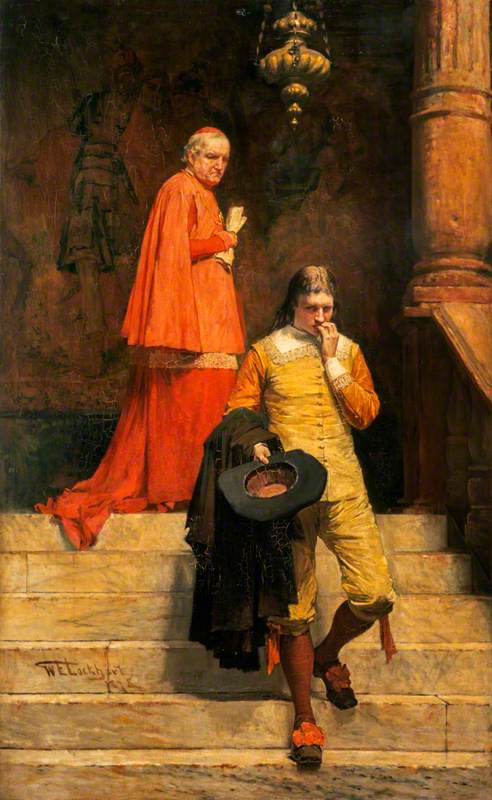
Gil Blas and the Archbishop of Granada by William Ewart Lockhart

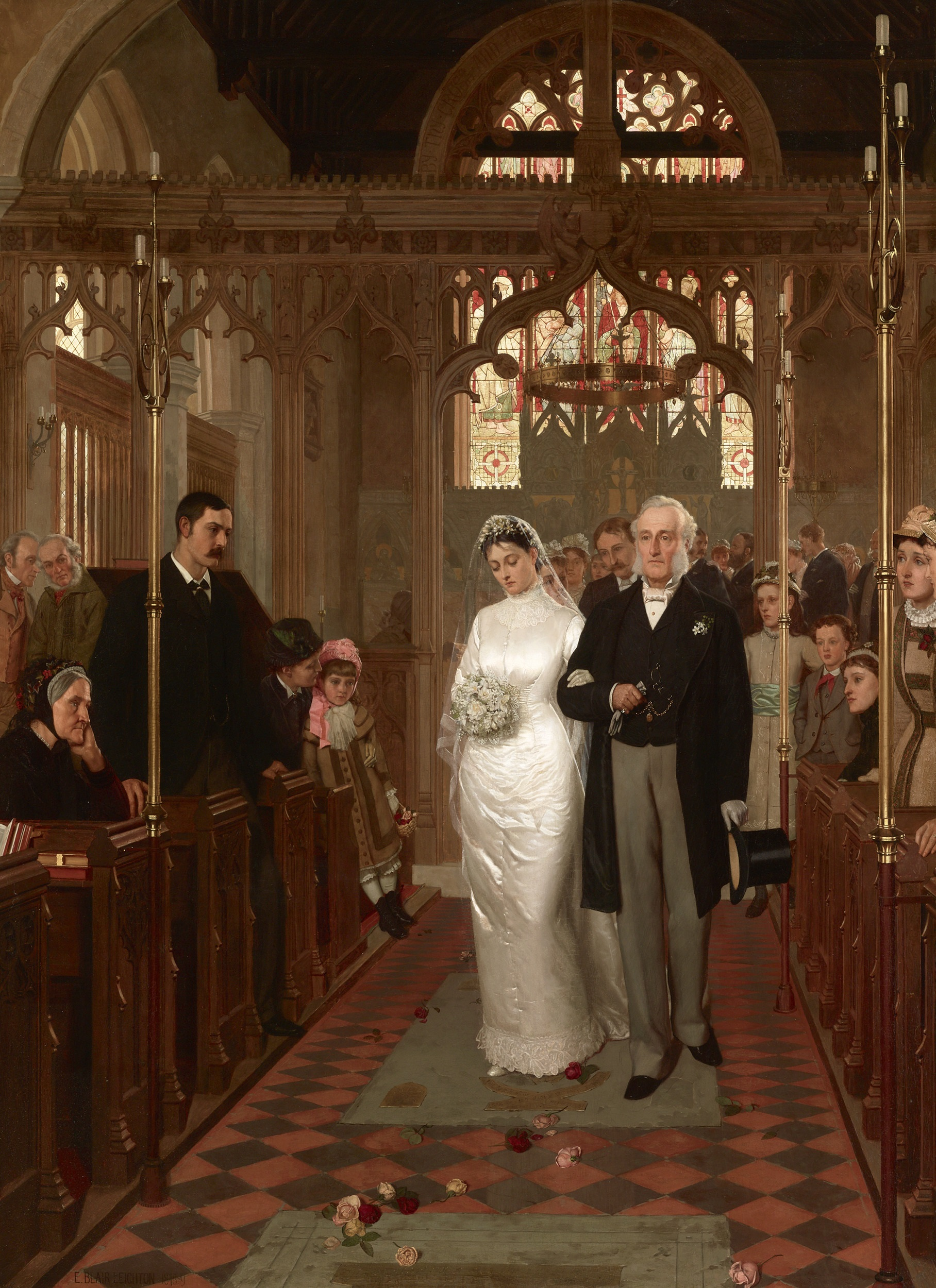
Till Death Us Do Part by Edmund Blair Leighton

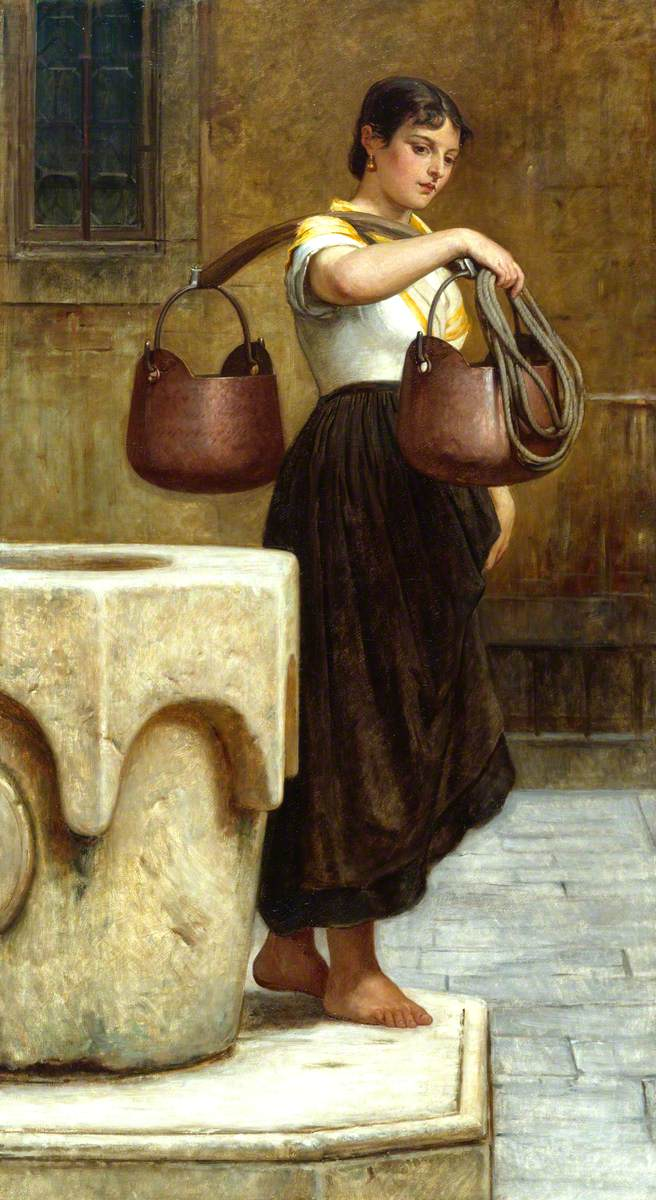
La Biccolante, A Venetian Water-Carrier by William Frederick Yeames

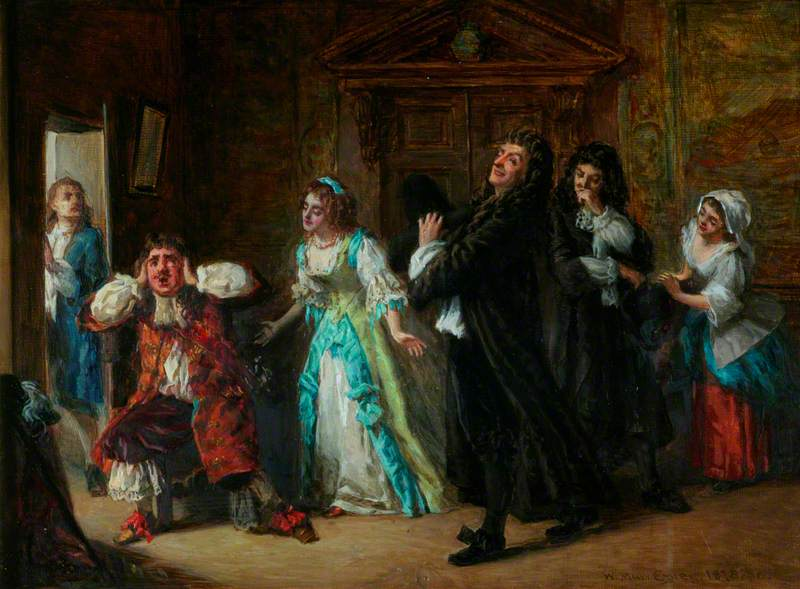
Scene from Molière's Le Medecin Malgré Lui by William Maw Egley

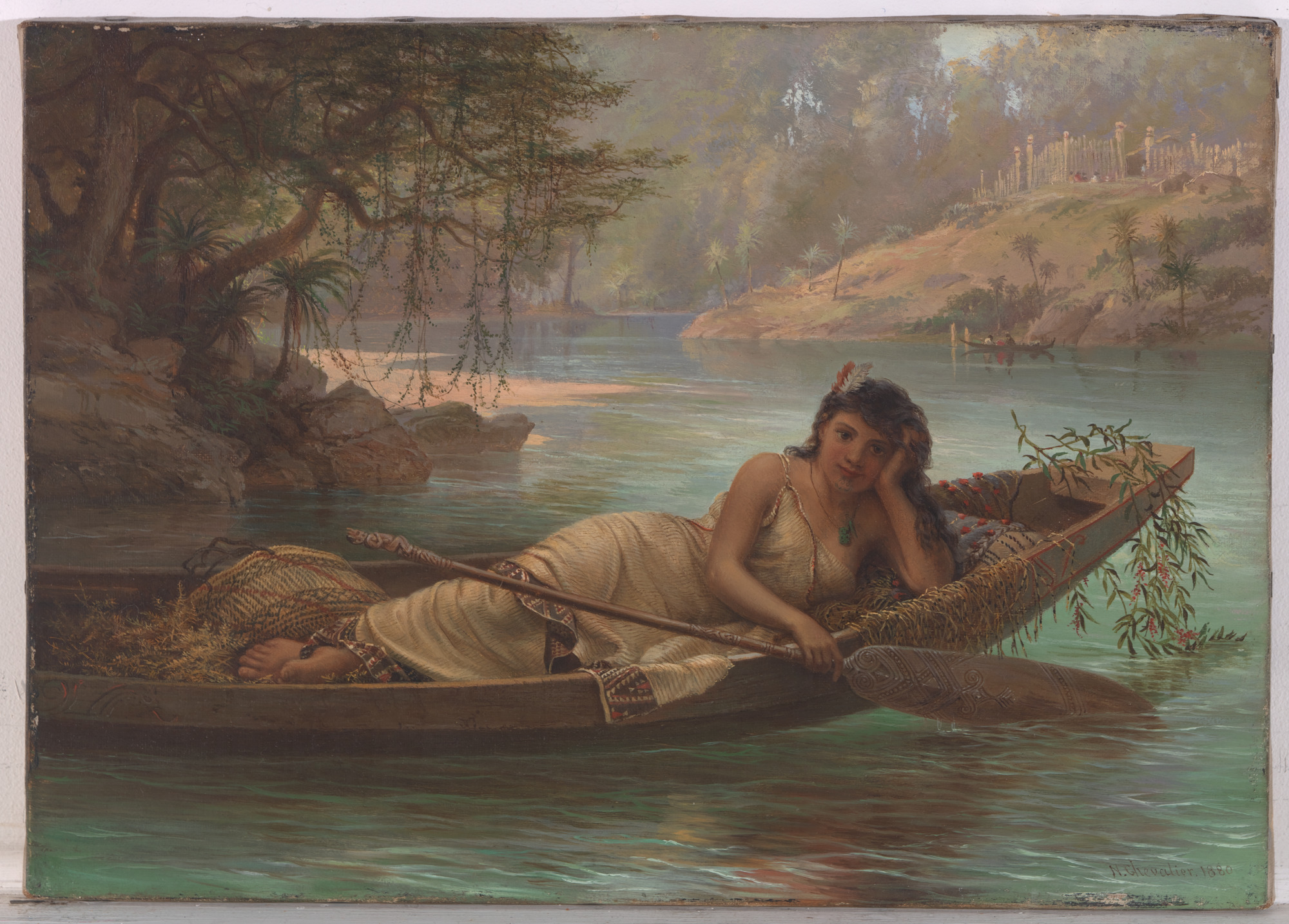
Hinemoa, the Maori Girl by Nicholas Chevalier

The Daughter of the House by Frank Holl

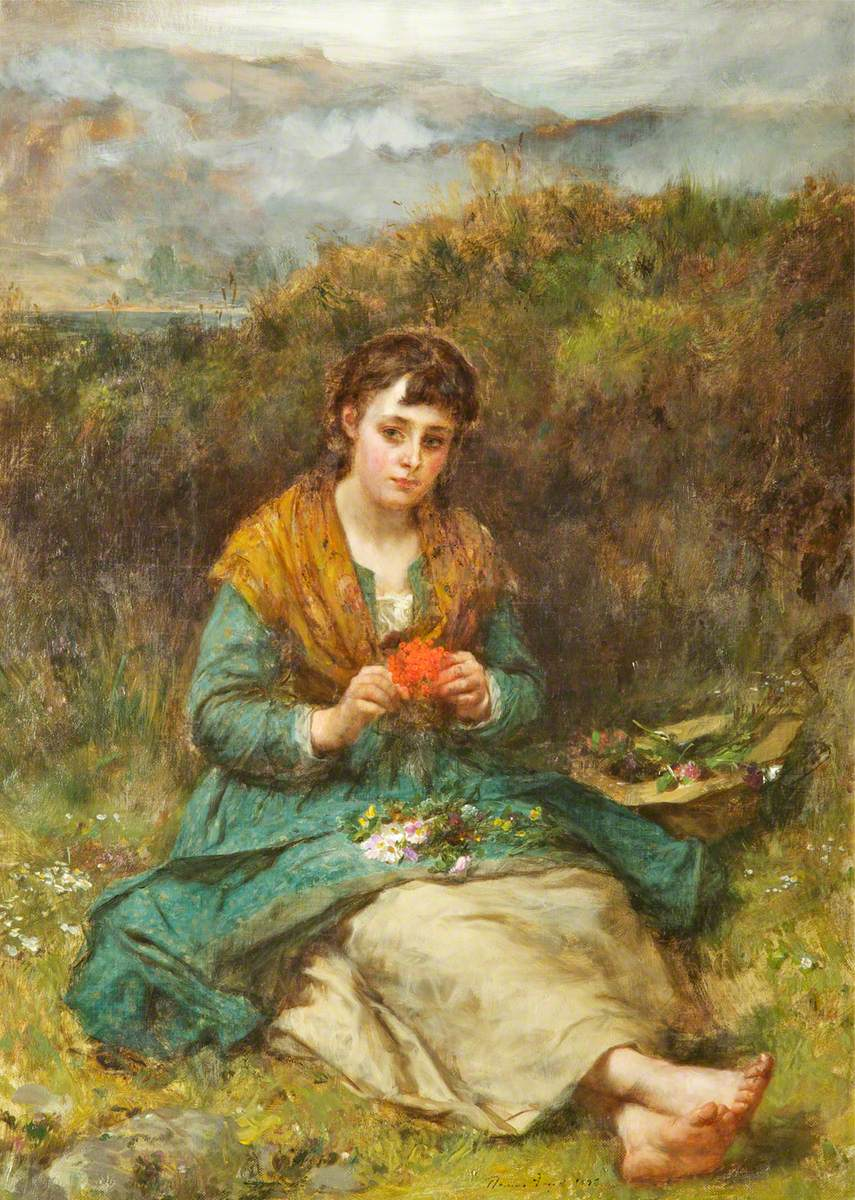
Free from Care by Thomas Faed

Marjory and Lettice by Arthur Hughes

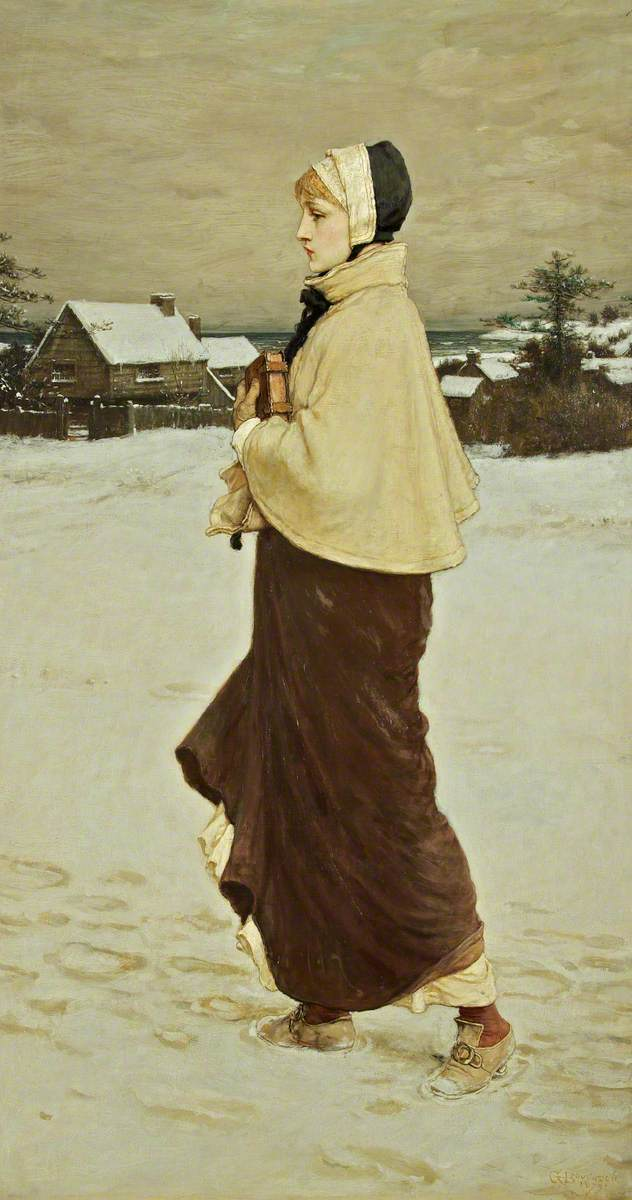
Priscilla by George Henry Boughton

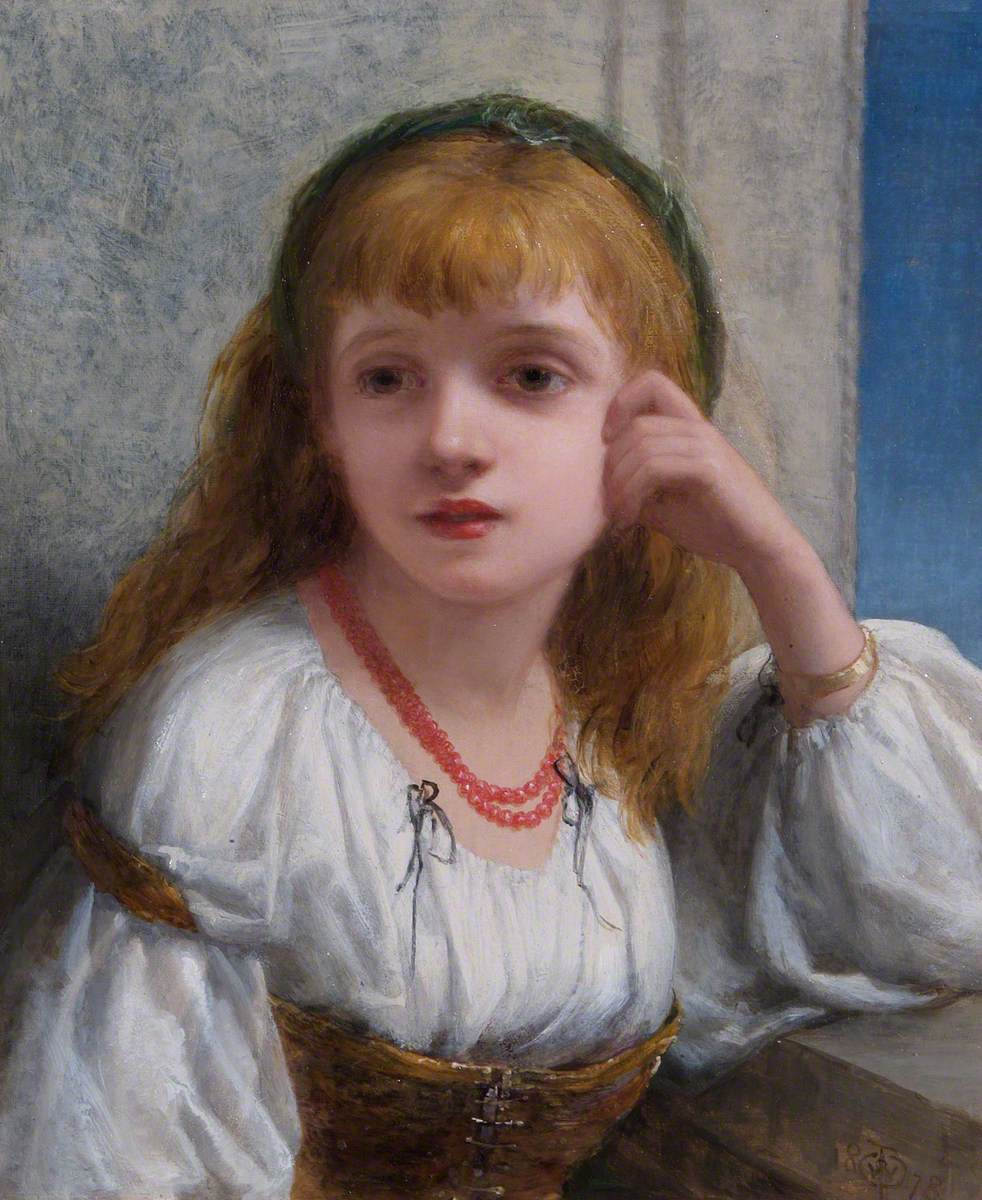
A Venetian Girl by William Charles Thomas Dobson

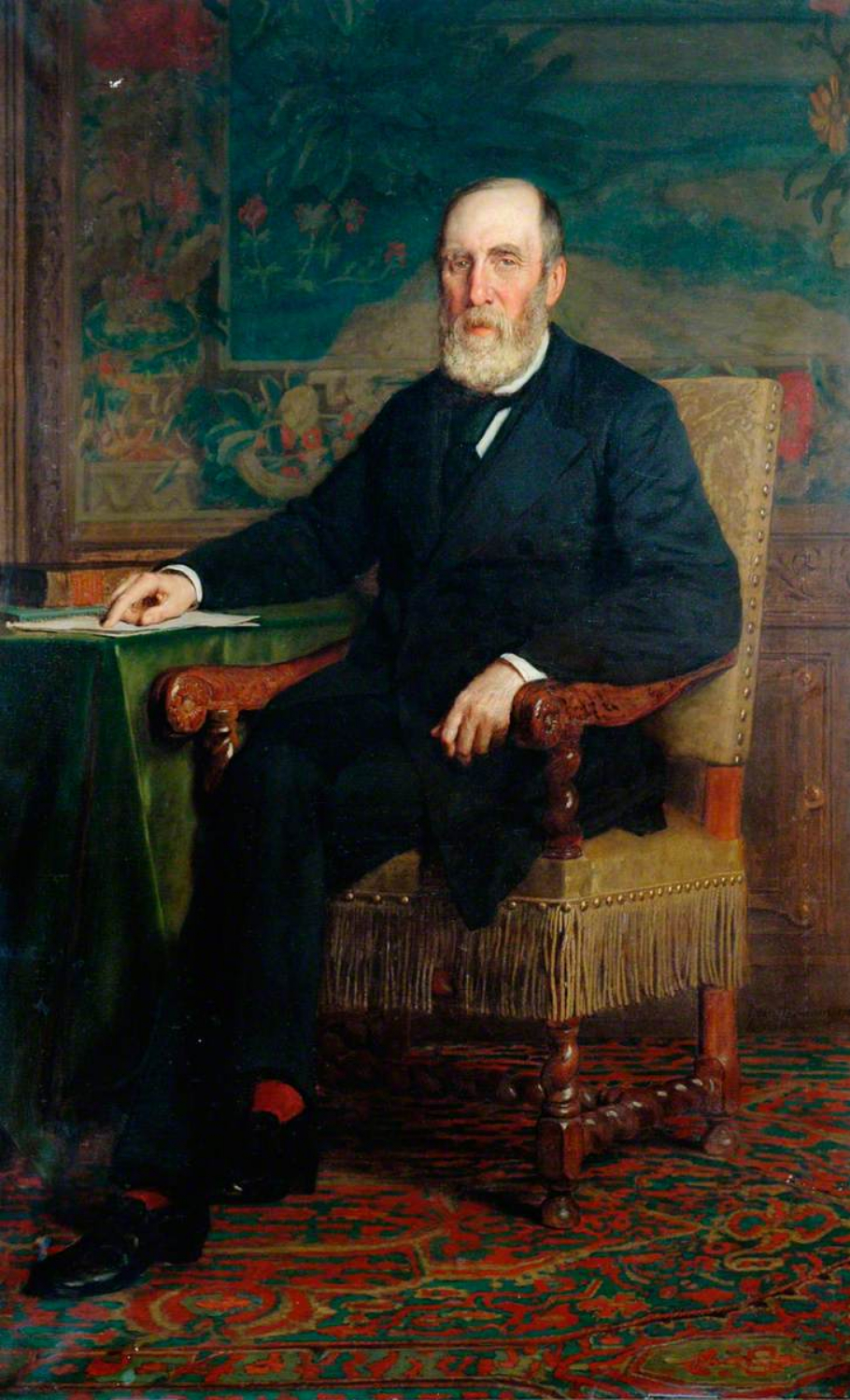
Samuel Laing by Pieter Van Havermaet

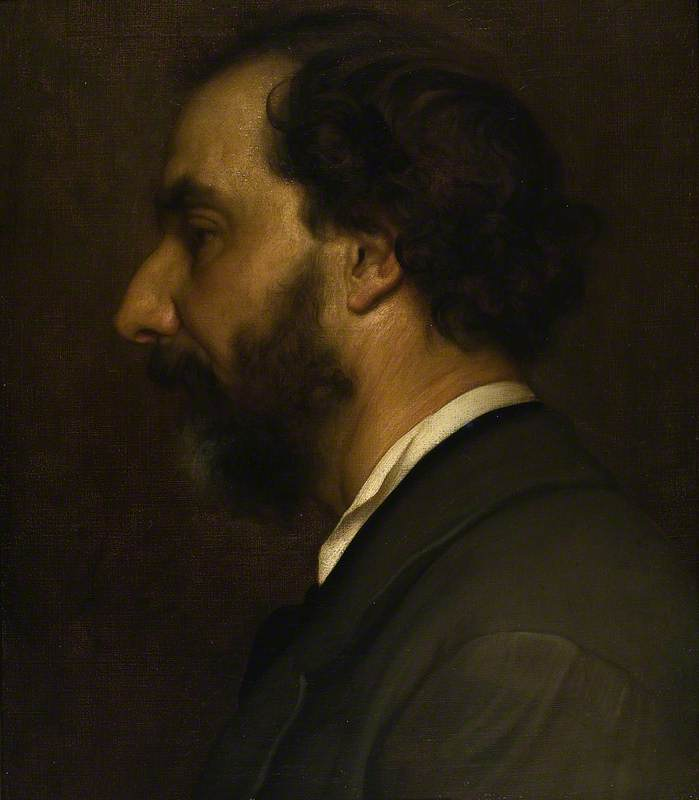
Giovanni Costa by Frederic Leighton

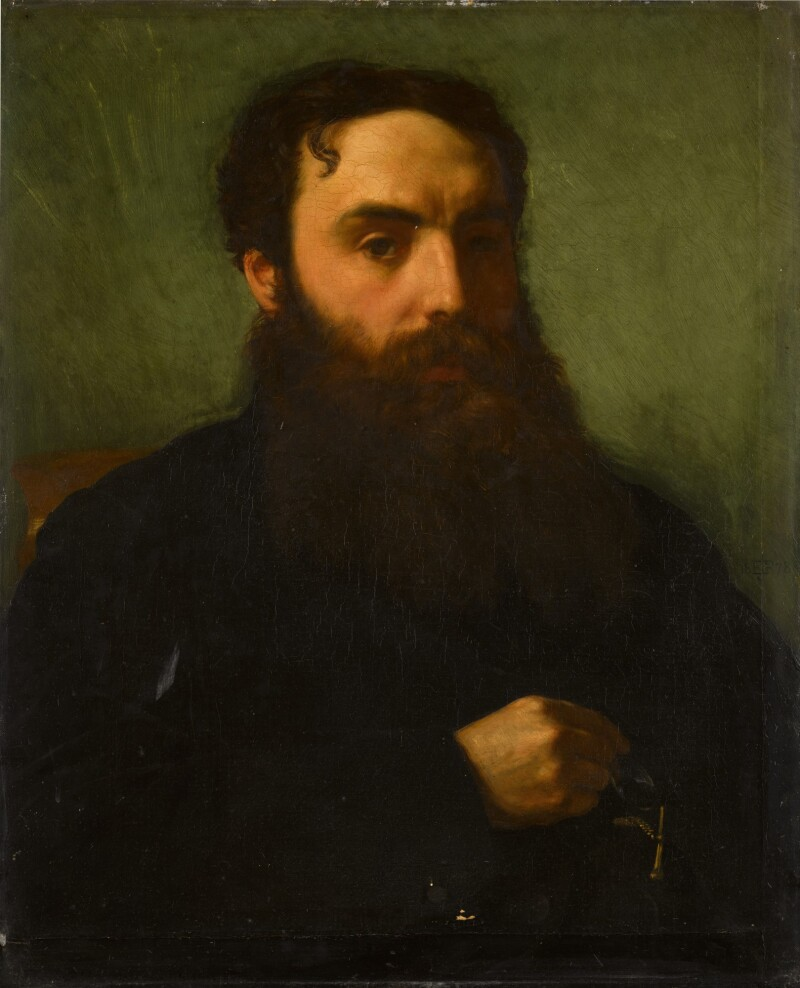
Alfred Baldwin by Edward Poynter

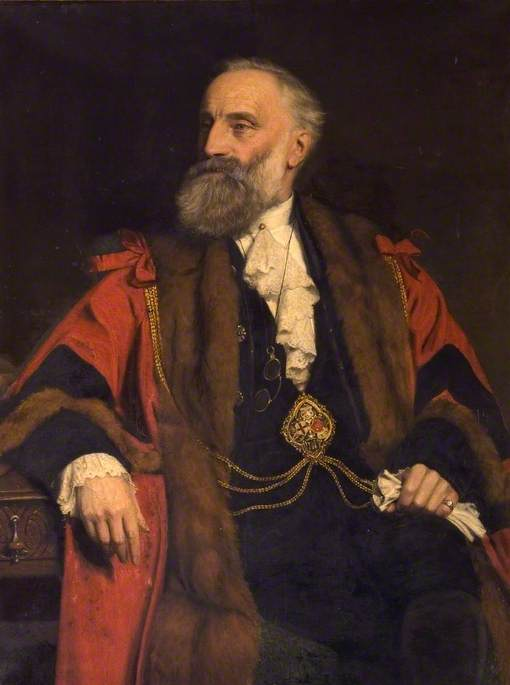
George Burt by John Edgar Williams

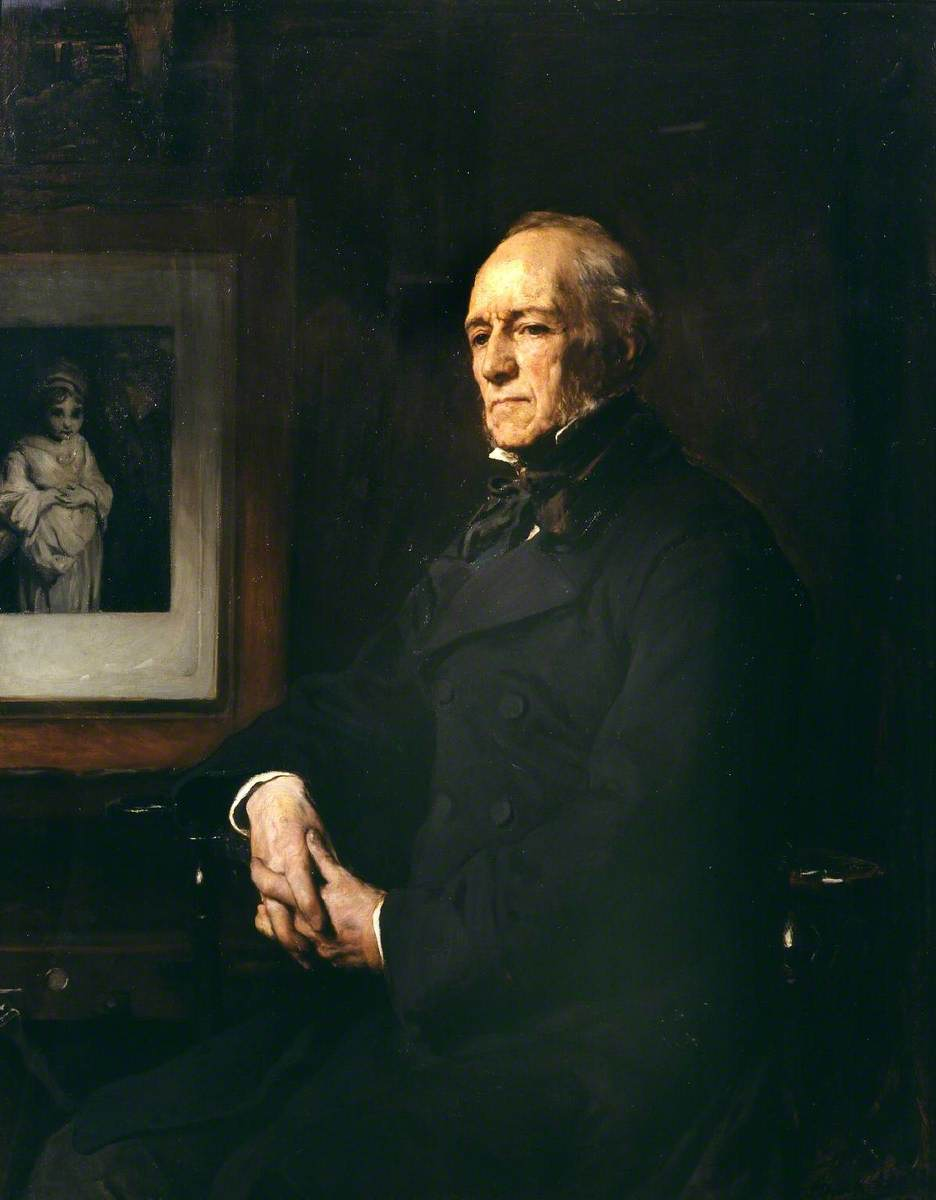
Samuel Cousins by Frank Holl

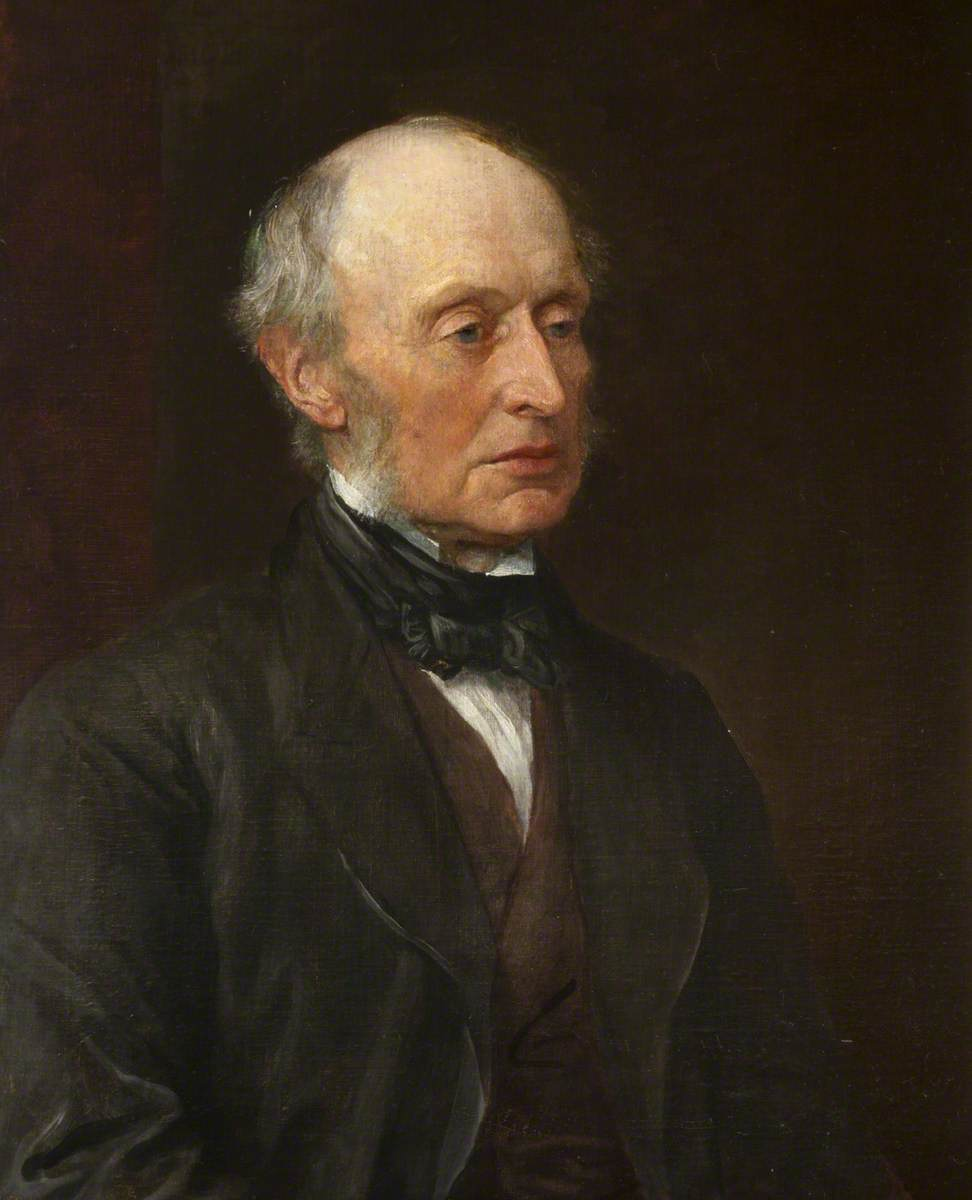
William Armstrong by George Frederic Watts

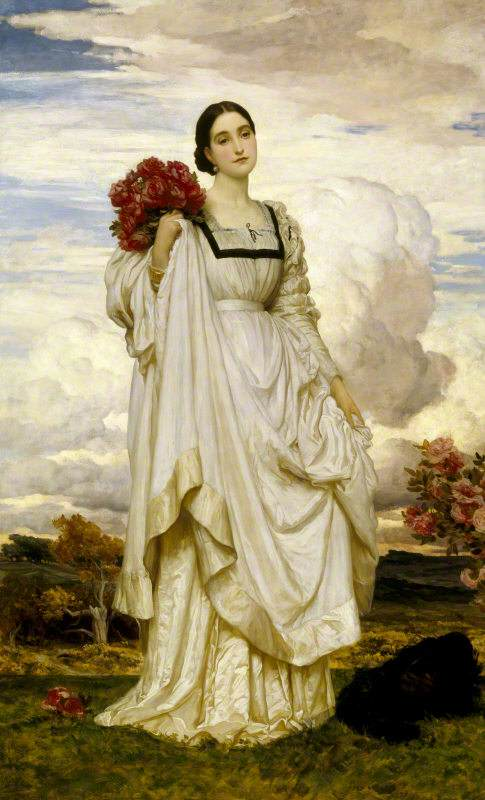
Countess Brownlow Frederic Leighton

John Lort Stokes by Stephen Pearce

== See also ==
- Salon of 1879, a contemporary art exhibition held in Paris

== Bibliography ==
- Green, Richard & Sellars, Jane. William Powell Frith: The People's Painter. Bloomsbury, 2019.
