= Found Drowned =

Painting by George Frederic Watts

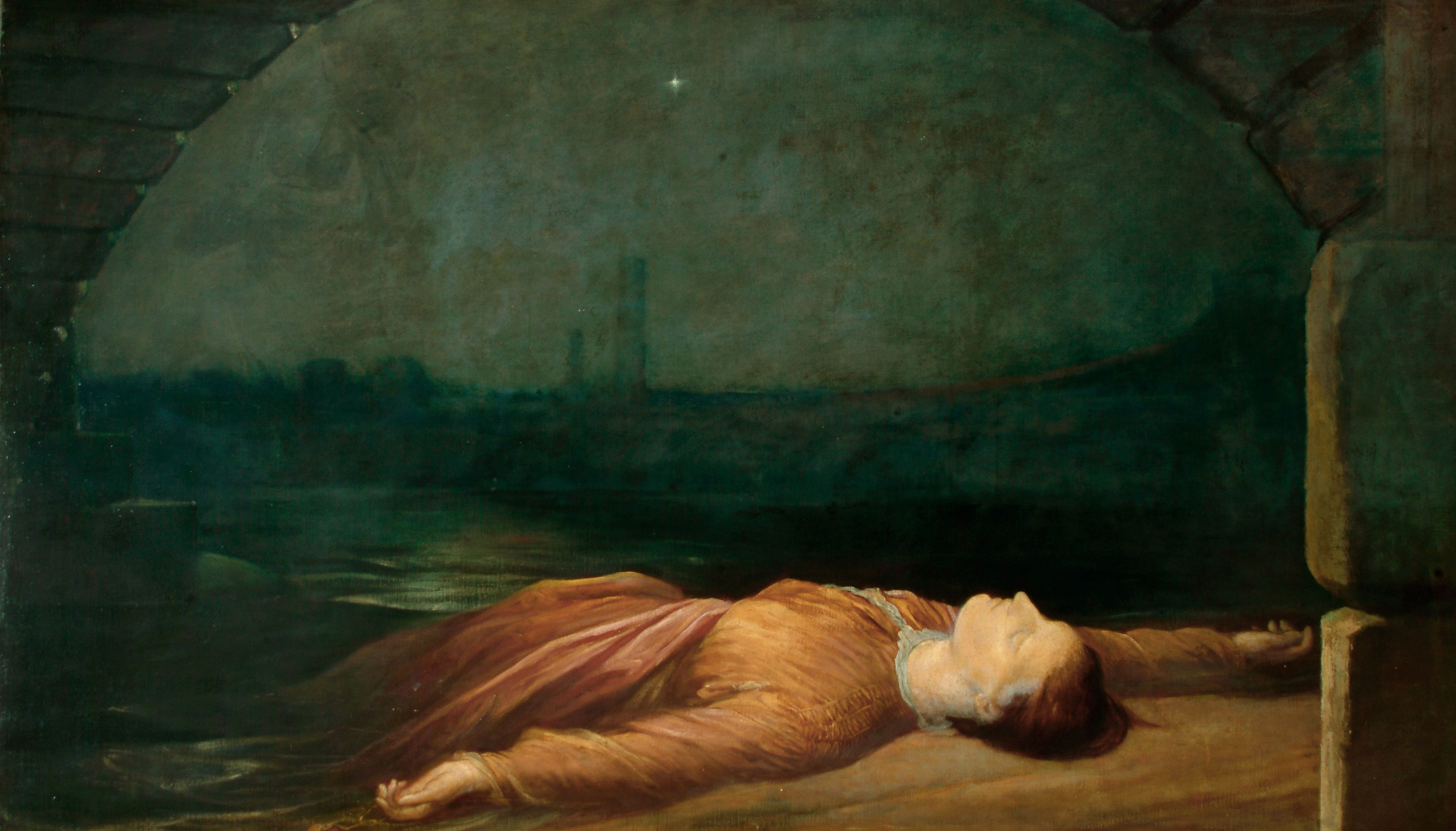
- Artist: George Frederic Watts
- Year: 1848–1850
- Type: Oil
- Dimensions: 119.4 cm × 213.4 cm (47.0 in × 84.0 in)
- Location: Watts Gallery, Compton

Found Drowned is an oil painting by George Frederic Watts, c. 1850, inspired by Thomas Hood's 1844 poem The Bridge of Sighs.

The painting depicts the dead body of a woman washed up beneath the arch of Waterloo Bridge, with her lower body still immersed in the water of the River Thames. She is presumed to have drowned after having thrown herself into the river in despair to escape the shame of being a "fallen woman". The grey industrial cityscape of the south bank of the Thames is barely visible in the background through thick smog. Dressed simply, perhaps a servant, her arms and body form the shape of a cross, much reminiscent of the crucifixion of Christ. She holds a locket and chain in one hand, indicating her attachment to her lover; a single star is visible as a sign of hope in the sky above.

It is one of four large social realist paintings made by Watts in 1848–50, created soon after he had returned to England from an extended period in Italy, all on melancholy themes. The others are Under the Dry Arch, Irish Famine, and Song of the Shirt (after Hood's poem "The Song of the Shirt"; this painting is also known as The Seamstress).

Several other artists were inspired by Hood's poem The Bridge of Sighs. Examples of similar works include Rossetti's Found and Abraham Solomon's Drowned! Drowned!. The scene is echoed in the third painting of Augustus Egg's 1858 series, Past and Present.

Watts quickly abandoned his dalliance with social realism, and returned to allegorical themes. He never sold his four social realist paintings, which were first exhibited at the Grosvenor Gallery in 1881–82 and are now all held by the Watts Gallery in Compton, near Guildford in Surrey.

== Gallery ==
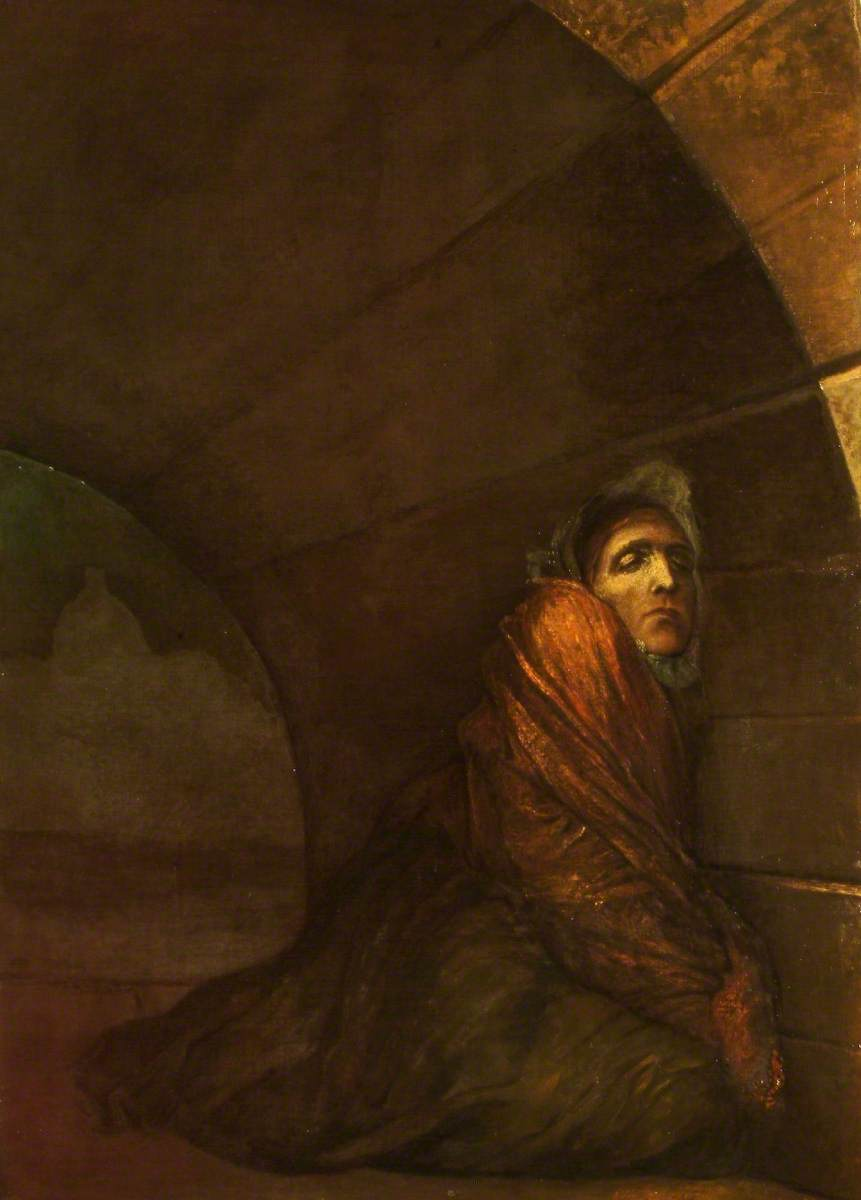
Under the Dry Arch, 1849-1850, Watts Gallery

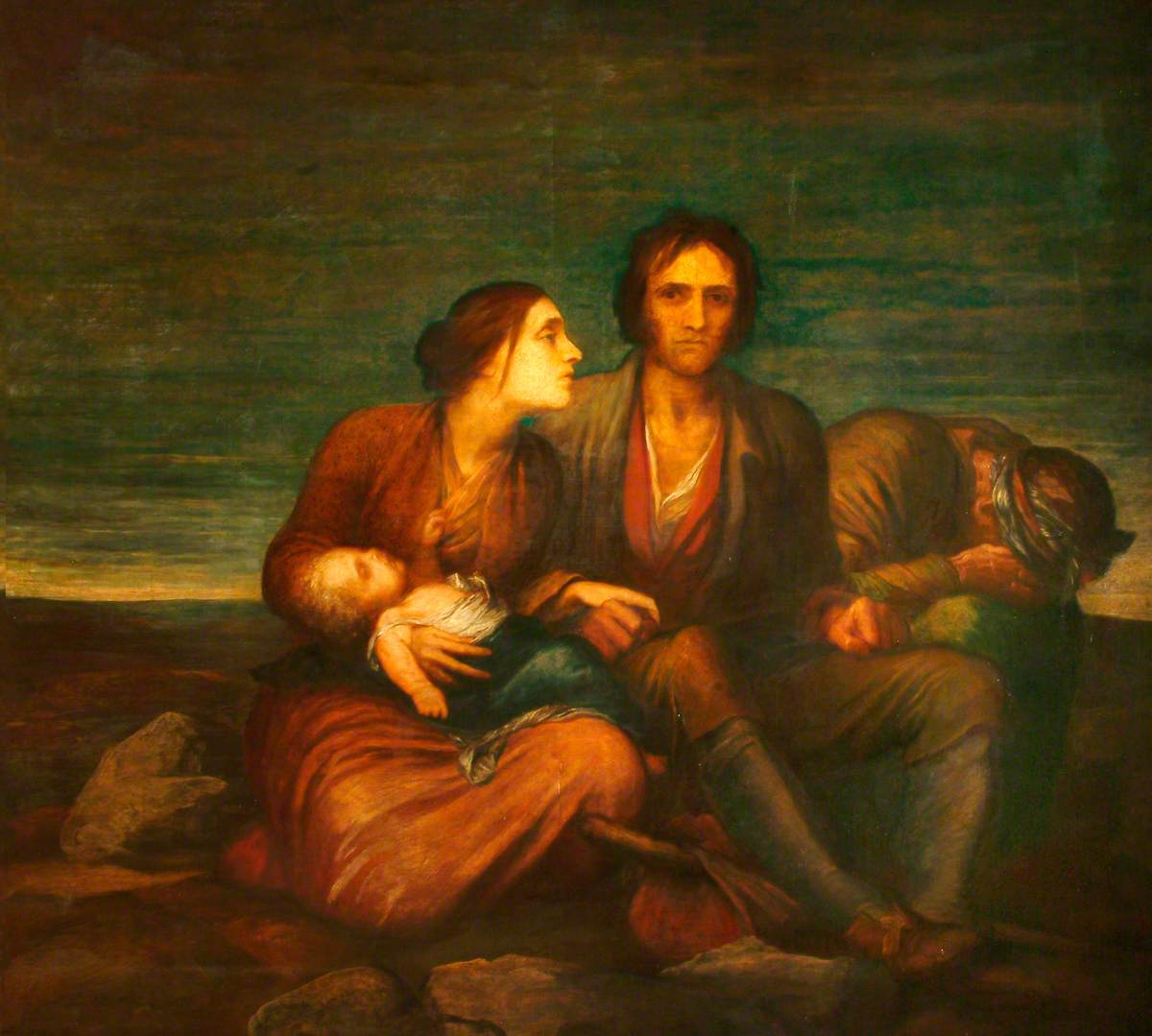
Irish Famine, 1850, Watts Gallery

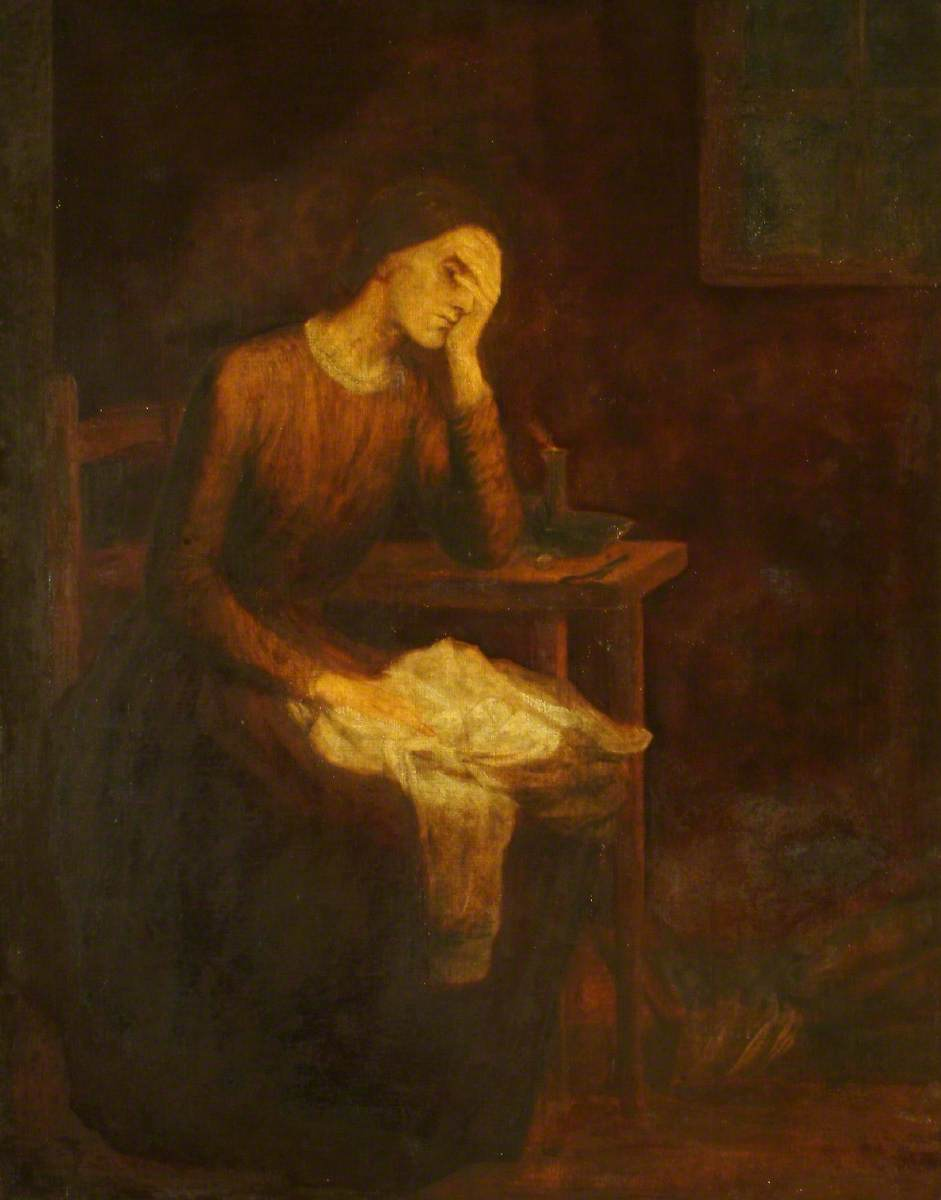
Song of the Shirt, 1850, Watts Gallery
