= Jane Ellen Panton =

English writer

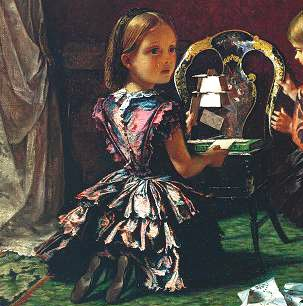
- Jane Ellen Panton, from the triptych, Past And Present
- Born: Jane Ellen Frith; 18 October 1847; Regent's Park, London, England
- Died: 13 May 1923 (aged 75); Bloomsbury, London, England
- Known for: Writing
- Spouse: James Albert Panton (m. 1869)
- Children: Five
- Parent: William Powell Frith (father)
- Relatives: Walter Frith (brother)

Jane Ellen Panton (18 October 1847 – 13 May 1923), born Jane Ellen Frith, was an English writer.

== Life ==
Jane Ellen Frith was born in Regent's Park in 1847. Her father, William Powell Frith was a successful painter and Panton reports that he showed very little interest in his children. After her mother, Isabelle Jane, died in 1880 she found out that her father had a mistress and further children. At this point her father married his former mistress.

Panton appeared as a model in the 1859 painting trilogy Past and Present by Augustus Egg which incidentally deals with a spouse being unfaithful. She also appeared in another two paintings; one by her father and the other by Alfred Elmore. Her father's house would host visits by Charles Dickens and John Ruskin.

She married James Albert Panton at All Saints' Church in Kensington on 10 August 1869. Her husband was a partner in a family brewery business and he was bought out by his brother's widow in 1882. During that period she lived in the Dorset market town of Wareham, which featured in her memoir of 1909, Fresh Leaves And Green Pastures, the domestic print run of which was destroyed in settlement of a libel action brought by local squire Guy Marston, who contested the claim that he had wantonly destroyed records of the Rempstone estate upon his inheritance. The memoir was, however, published in the USA.

The couple briefly lived in Bournemouth before settling in Bromley for four years, where Panton befriended the writer Dinah Craik who lived nearby. During this time they awaited payment for the sale of their share in the brewery, and Panton decided to write to raise money, pitching the idea of articles on home furnishing to the Ladies Pictorial magazine. She showed originality in her articles and in the idea of writing about interior design. In addition, Panton earned substantial sums as an interior design consultant.

Panton's novels were numerous, but "undistinguished". They included Having and Holding. A Story of Country Life, which deals with rural politics in a fictional Southern English county, and The Cannibal Crusader: an Allegory for the Times (1908), in which a noble savage exposes the folly of modern society. An obituary in The Times stated she had 'a vivid and brilliant personality' and was 'a witty and outspoken conversationalist' (21 May 1923).

Jane Ellen Panton died in Bloomsbury in 1923.

== Works ==
- Panton's Poems (1880)
- Country Sketches in Black and White (1882)
- From Kitchen to Garret: Hints for Young Householders (1887)
- Nooks and Corners; being the Companion Volume to "From Kitchen to Garret" (1889)
- Bypaths and Cross-Roads (1889)
- Having and Holding: A Story of Country Life (1890)
- Homes of Taste: Economical Hints (1890)
- Within Four Walls: A Handbook for Invalids (1893)
- Suburban Residences and How To Circumvent Them (1896)
- Leaves from a Life (her autobiography, 1908)
- A Cannibal Crusader: An Allegory for the Times (1908)
- Fresh leaves and green pastures (1909)
- Leaves from a Garden (1910)
- Most of the Game (1911)
- More Leaves from a Life (further volume of autobiography, 1911)

== Family ==
James Albert Panton and Jane had five children, three sons and two daughters. One of the sons was the physician Philip Noel Panton (1877–1950).
