= Past and Present (paintings) =

Triptych by Augustus Egg

Past and Present is the title usually given to the series of three oil paintings made by Augustus Egg in 1858, which are designed to be exhibited together as a triptych. When first exhibited at Royal Academy in 1858 the paintings were untitled, but accompanied by a fictional quotation from a diary, "August the 4th – Have just heard that B— has been dead more than a fortnight, so his poor children have now lost both parents. I hear she was seen on Friday last near the Strand, evidently without a place to lay her head. What a fall hers has been!".

== Painting ==
The triptych depicts the discovery and disastrous consequences of a wife's adultery on a middle-class Victorian family. The artist leaves the viewer to determine whether the woman should be condemned or pitied. The paintings reflected fears that public morality and family life were imperiled by the recent Matrimonial Causes Act 1857, which reformed the law of divorce by moving jurisdiction from the ecclesiastical courts to the civil court, and made divorce a realistic prospect for the middle classes.

The works – a visual morality tale based on a single moment – were influenced by William Holman Hunt's 1853 painting The Awakening Conscience. It is not certain how they acquired the title Past and Present, which is not known to have been used by the artist, and is first recorded in the auction catalogue for Egg's works after his death in 1863. It is surmised that it derives from a misreading of John Ruskin's Academy Notes, in which the untitled works are discussed below a review of a painting with that title.

At the original 1858 exhibition, the first painting – the discovery in the drawing-room – was hung flanked by the two other paintings, which depict parallel scenes several years later. When originally exhibited, the central painting was raised slightly above the flanking images.

Past and Present

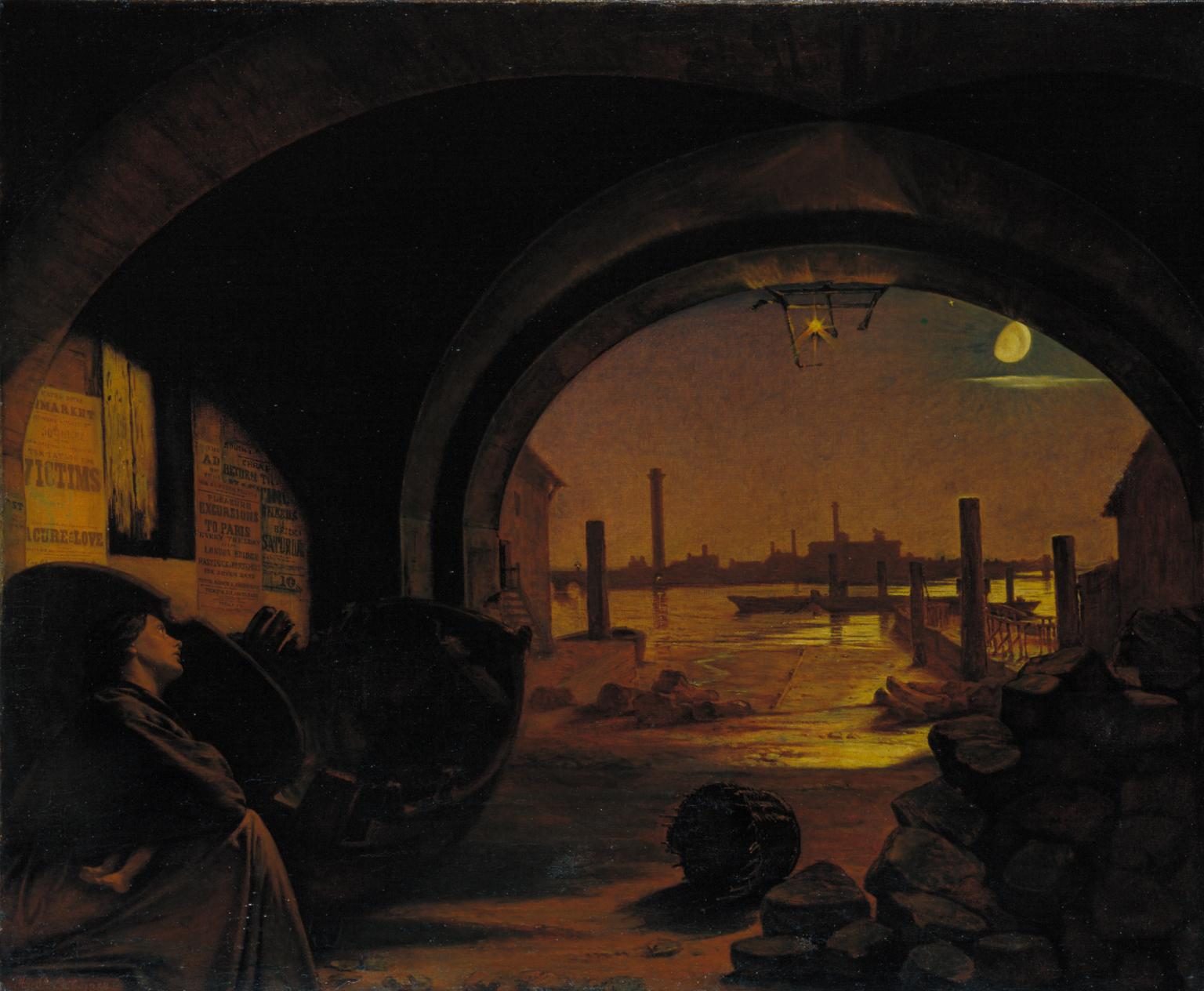
No. 3 - Despair

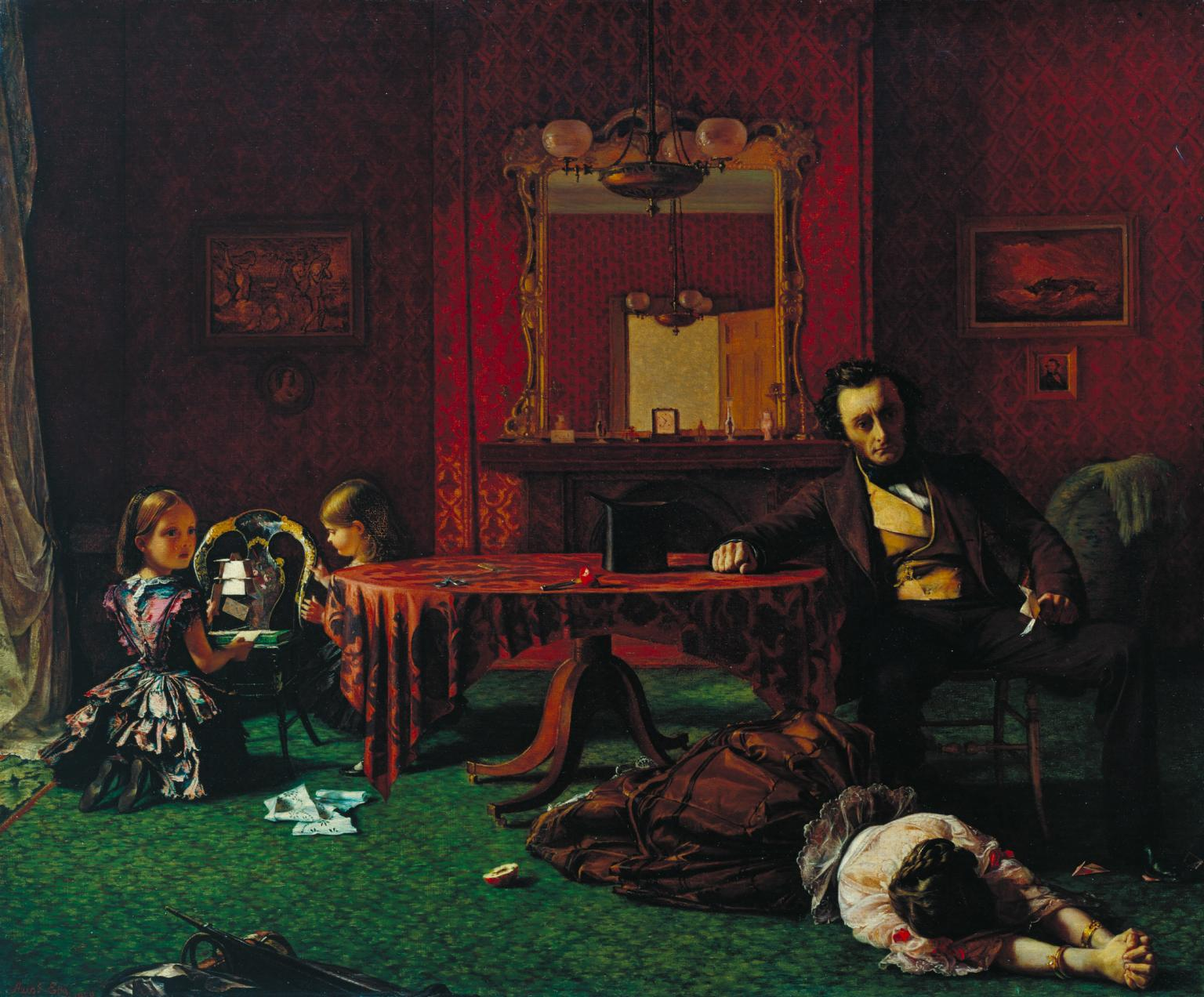
No. 1 - Misfortune

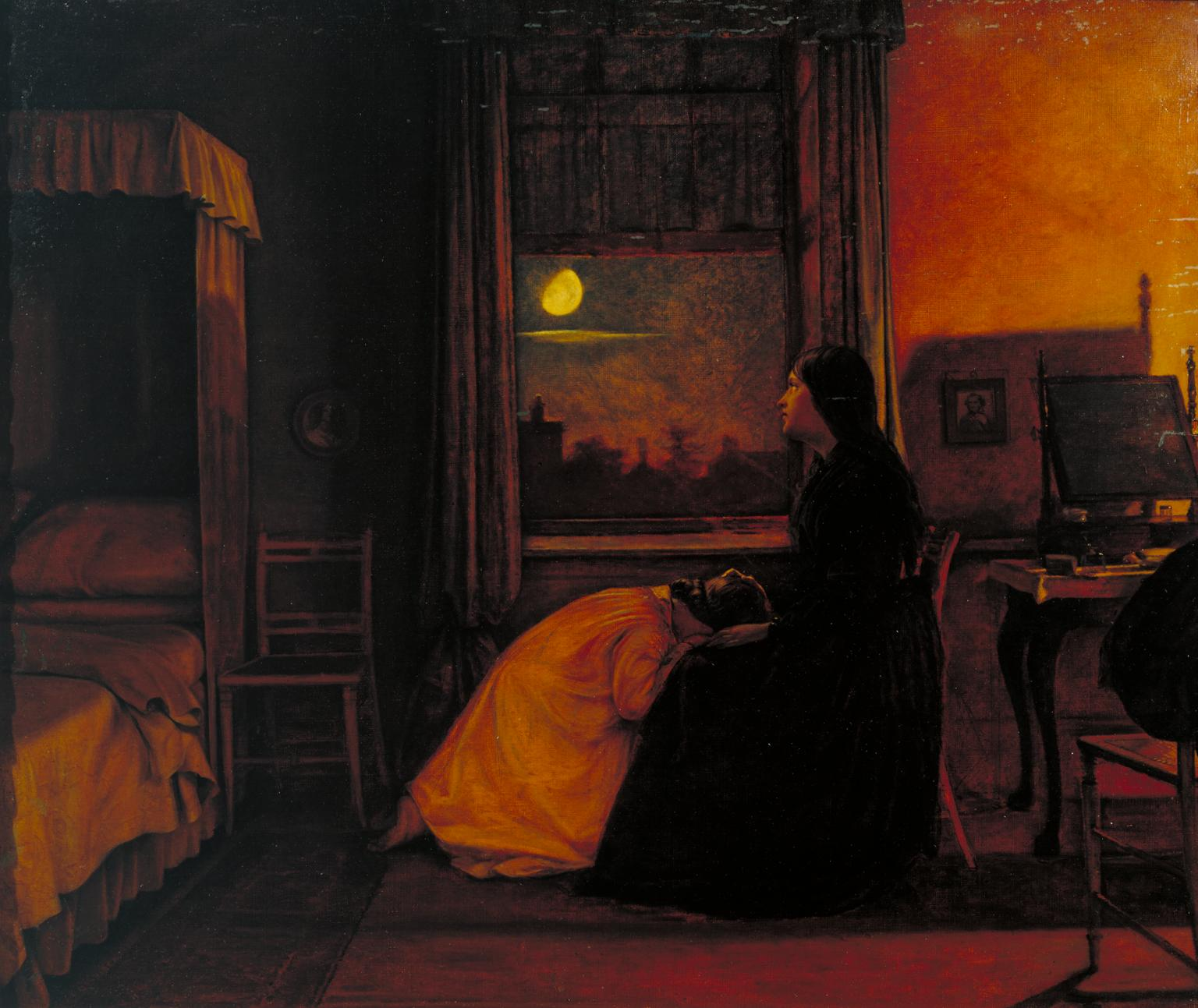
No. 2 - Prayer

August the 4th - Have just heard that B— has been dead more than a fortnight, so his poor children have now lost both parents. I hear she was seen on Friday last near the Strand, evidently without a place to lay her head. What a fall hers has been!

Ruskin's "Academy Notes" (8 May 1858) described the three works:

In the central piece the husband discovers his wife's infidelity; he dies five years afterwards. The two lateral pictures represent the same moment of night a fortnight after his death. The same little cloud is under the moon. The two children see it from the chamber in which they are praying for their lost mother, and their mother, from behind a boat under a vault on the river shore.

Each painting measures 63.5 centimetres (25.0 in) by 76.2 centimetres (30.0 in). They were all donated to the Tate Gallery in 1918 by Sir Alec and Lady Martin in memory of their daughter Nora, and are now usually given the rather prosaic titles Past and Present, No. 1, Past and Present, No. 2 and Past and Present, No. 3, although occasionally they are titled Misfortune, Prayer, and Despair. The number order does not represent the way they were exhibited (the first scene was shown in the centre), but rather an implied conventional Hogarthian progress of social decline from middle-class prosperity through genteel poverty and, finally, to destitution.

== Past and Present, No. 1 ==
The first painting shows the drawing-room of a middle-class Victorian home, with a large gilt mirror over a fireplace, and central round table. It depicts the moment when the family's domestic bliss is broken, with many details echoing the sudden change in circumstances. A woman lies prostrate on the green carpet before her husband, fallen as if in a swoon, hands clasped together, with her gold serpent bracelet resembling manacles. He sits dumbfounded, clutching a letter which reveals her adultery, his left foot resting on a portrait miniature of her lover. An apple has been cut into two pieces; one half remains beside the husband's glossy top hat on the table, stabbed through its worm-ridden core by a small knife; the other half has fallen to the floor beside the wife. The family's two daughters are playing to the left of the painting, but their house of cards – built on top of a novel by Balzac, possibly also a tale of adultery – is tumbling to the floor. (The older girl was modelled by Jane, one of William Powell Frith's daughters.) The rear wall of the room, decorated with a rich red wallpaper, also bears two portraits, one on either side of the fireplace and mirror: the wife's portrait hangs to the left, above the playing children but beneath a picture of the expulsion of Adam and Eve from the Garden of Eden (labelled "The Fall"); the husband's to the right hangs beneath a shipwreck scene by Clarkson Stanfield (labelled "Abandoned"). The mirror shows the open door, through which the wife is soon to depart. The packed bag and umbrella by the door may underline her imminent departure, or could have been cast down by the husband when he arrived home.

== Past and Present, No. 2 ==
The second painting shows a night scene, several years later, in a dark and sparsely-furnished bedroom shortly after the death of the heartbroken husband. The children are older now: the younger one kneels in a white nightgown, weeping into the lap of the elder, who sits in a black mourning dress, looking out of a window at rooftops and a clouded moon. The same small portraits of the husband and the wife decorate the bedroom wall.

== Past and Present, No. 3 ==
The third painting is also a night scene. The details of the cloud and moon show it is the same evening as depicted in the second painting. The fallen wife is resting in the detritus-strewn shadows beneath the Adelphi Arches, by the River Thames. She clutches a bundle of rags from which protrude the emaciated legs of an infant, perhaps the fruit of her affair, either asleep or dead. Posters on the wall advertise two contemporary plays, Victims by Tom Taylor and The Cure for Love by Tom Parry, both tales of unhappy marriages, and also "Pleasure excursions to Paris", perhaps a reference to the novel by Balzac in the first picture. She looks up from her place in the gutter to the moon and stars above.

A similarly watery destination for fallen women was depicted in Rossetti's Found (begun 1854), GF Watts's Found Drowned (c. 1850) and Abraham Solomon's Drowned! Drowned!, all inspired by Thomas Hood's 1844 poem, "The Bridge of Sighs".
