= The Awakening Conscience =

Painting by William Holman Hunt

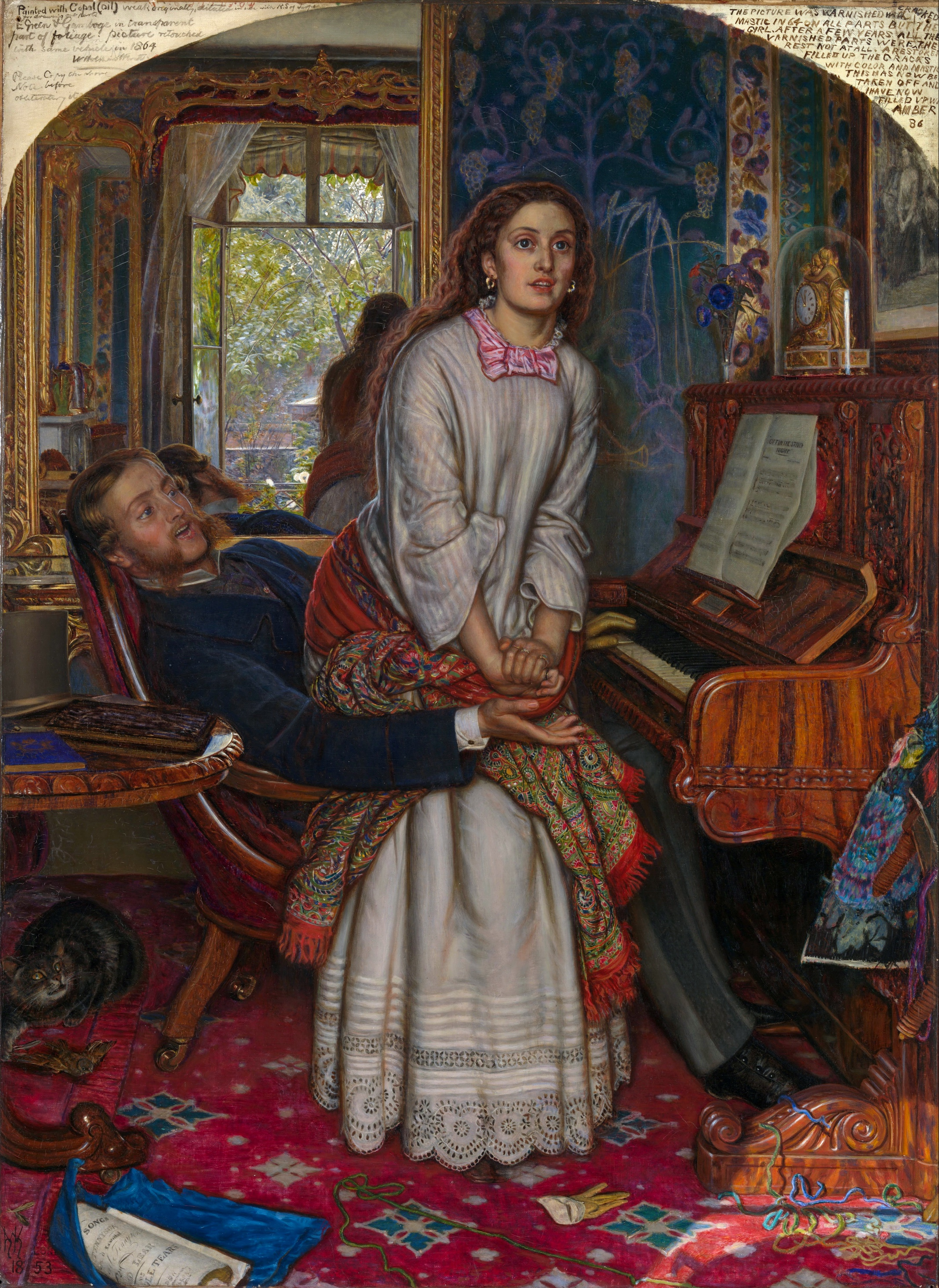
- Artist: William Holman Hunt
- Year: 1853
- Medium: Oil on canvas
- Dimensions: 76 cm × 56 cm (30 in × 22 in)
- Location: Tate Britain, London

The Awakening Conscience (1853) is an oil-on-canvas painting by the English artist William Holman Hunt, one of the founders of the Pre-Raphaelite Brotherhood, which depicts a woman rising from her position in a man's lap and gazing transfixed out the room's window.

The painting is in the collection of the Tate Britain, in London.

== Subject matter ==
Initially, the painting appears to depict a momentary disagreement between husband and wife, but the title and a host of symbols within the painting make it clear that this is a mistress and her lover. The woman's clasped hands provide a focal point and the position of her left hand emphasizes the absence of a wedding ring, although rings are worn on every other finger. Around the room are dotted reminders of her "kept" status and her wasted life: the cat beneath the table toying with a bird; the clock concealed under glass; a tapestry that hangs unfinished on the piano; the threads which lie unravelled on the floor; the print of Frank Stone's Cross Purposes on the wall; Edward Lear's musical arrangement of Alfred, Lord Tennyson's 1847 poem "Tears, Idle Tears" which lies discarded on the floor, and the music on the piano, Thomas Moore's "Oft in the Stilly Night", the words of which speak of missed opportunities and sad memories of a happier past. The discarded glove and top hat thrown on the tabletop suggest a hurried assignation.

The room is too cluttered and gaudy to be in a Victorian family home; the bright colours, unscuffed carpet, and pristine, highly polished furniture speak of a room recently furnished for a mistress. Art historian Elizabeth Prettejohn notes that although the interior is now viewed as "Victorian" it still exudes the "'nouveau-riche' vulgarity" that would have made the setting distasteful to contemporary viewers. The painting's frame is decorated with further symbols: bells (for warning), marigolds (for sorrow), and a star above the girl's head (a sign of spiritual revelation). Its frame bears a verse from the Book of Proverbs (25:20): "As he that taketh away a garment in cold weather, so is he that singeth songs to an heavy heart".

The mirror on the rear wall provides a tantalizing glimpse out of the scene. The window — opening out onto a spring garden, in direct contrast to the images of entrapment within the room — is flooded with sunlight. The woman's face does not display a look of shock that she has been surprised with her lover; whatever attracts her is outside of both the room and her relationship. The Athenæum commented in 1854:

The author of "The Bridge of Sighs" could not have conceived a more painful-looking face. The details of the picture, the reflection of the spring trees in the mirror, the piano, the bronze under the lamp, are wonderfully true, but the dull indigoes and reds of the picture make it melancholy and appropriate, and not pleasing in tone. The sentiment is of the Ernest Maltravers School: to those who have an affinity for it, painful; to those who have not, repulsive. (Note: "The Bridge of Sighs" was a poem by Thomas Hood about a prostitute who commits suicide by jumping into the Thames from a bridge. Ernest Maltravers was a novel by Edward Bulwer-Lytton about a love affair between an aristocrat and a poor girl.)

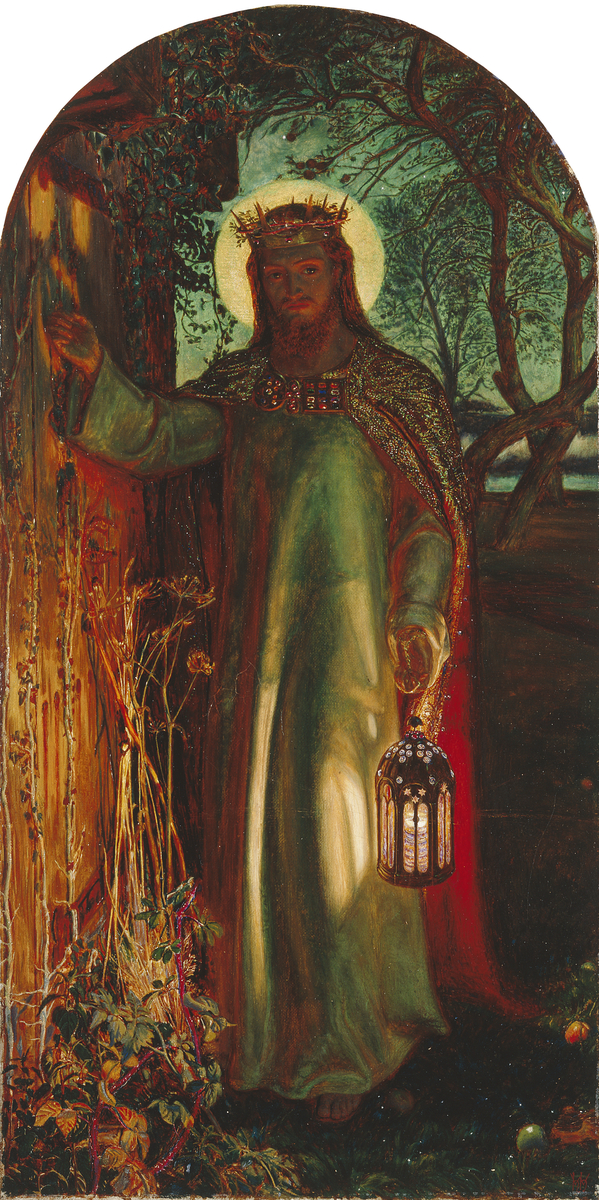
The Light of the World

In some ways this painting is a companion to Hunt's Christian painting The Light of the World, a picture of Christ holding a lantern as he knocks on an overgrown handleless door which Hunt said represented "the obstinately shut mind". The young woman here could be responding to that image, her conscience pricked by something outside of herself. Hunt intended this image to be The Light of the World's "material counterpart in a picture representing in actual life the manner in which the appeal of the spirit of heavenly love calls a soul to abandon a lower life." In Pre-Raphaelitism and the Pre-Raphaelite Brotherhood Hunt wrote that Peggotty's search for Emily in David Copperfield had given him the idea for the composition and he began to visit "different haunts of fallen girls" looking for a suitable setting. He did not plan to recreate any particular scene from David Copperfield, and initially wanted to capture something more general: "the loving seeker of the fallen girl coming upon the object of his search". But he reconsidered, deciding that such a meeting would engender different emotions in the girl than the repentance he wanted to show. He eventually settled on the idea that the girl's companion could be singing a song that suddenly reminded her of her former life and thereby act as the unknowing catalyst for her epiphany.

The model for the woman was Annie Miller, who sat for many of the Pre-Raphaelites and to whom Hunt was engaged until 1859. The male figure may be based on Thomas Seddon or Augustus Egg, both painter friends of Hunt.

== Repainting ==
The look on the girl's face in the modern painting is not the look of pain and horror that viewers saw when the painting was first exhibited, and which shocked and repulsed many of the contemporary critics. The painting was commissioned by Thomas Fairbairn, a Manchester industrialist and patron of the Pre-Raphaelites, after Egg discussed Hunt's ideas and possibly showed him some of the initial sketches. Fairbairn paid Hunt 350 guineas. The painting was exhibited at the Royal Academy in 1854, along with The Light of the World. Fairbairn found himself unable to bear looking at the woman's expression day-to-day, so persuaded Hunt to soften it. Hunt started work but fell ill and allowed the painting to be returned to Fairbairn for display at the Birmingham Society of Artists exhibition in 1856 before he was completely happy with the result. Later he was able to work on it again and confided to Edward Lear that he thought he had "materially bettered it". (Note: In a footnote Gissing claims that Hunt regretted agreeing to Fairbairn's request change the girl's expression.) As noted in the spandrels, Hunt retouched the painting in 1864 and again in 1886 when he repaired some work that had been carried out by a restorer in the interim.

== Views of John Ruskin ==
The Victorian art theorist John Ruskin praised The Awakening Conscience as an example of a new direction in British art in which the narrative was created from the artist's imagination rather than chronicling an event. Ruskin's reading of the painting was also to a moral end. In an 1854 letter to The Times defending the work, he claimed that there is "not a single object in all that room...but it becomes tragical if read rightly". He was struck by both the stark realism of the room — Hunt had hired a room in a "maison de convenance" (where lovers would take their mistresses) in order to capture the feeling — and the symbolic overtones and compared the revelation of the subjects' characters through the interiors favourably with that of William Hogarth's Marriage à-la-mode. The "common, modern, vulgar" interior is overwhelmed by lustrous, unworn objects that will never be part of a home. To Ruskin, the exquisite detail of the painting only called attention to the inevitable ruin of the couple: "The very hem of the poor girl's dress, at which the painter has laboured so closely, thread by thread, has story in it, if we think how soon its pure whiteness may be soiled with dust and rain, her outcast feet failing in the street". The idea of a visual morality tale, based on a single moment, influenced Augustus Egg's 1858 series of three paintings, Past and Present.

== In literature ==
In Evelyn Waugh's 1945 novel Brideshead Revisited an allusion to the painting reflects the unraveling of the affair between Julia Flyte and artist Charles Ryder.

The painting is mentioned in P.D. James's novel The Private Patient, in which a character describes it as a "hectic and...unconvincing depiction of remorse."

== Provenance ==
The painting was inherited by Fairbairn's son, Sir Arthur Henderson Fairbairn, 3rd Baronet. It was sold anonymously at Christie's in January 1946 and had been bought by Colin Anderson by 1947. It was donated to the Tate Gallery by Sir Colin and Lady Anderson in 1976.

== Notes ==
External videos
- Hunt's The Awakening Conscience, Smarthistory
