= Walter Frith =

English author

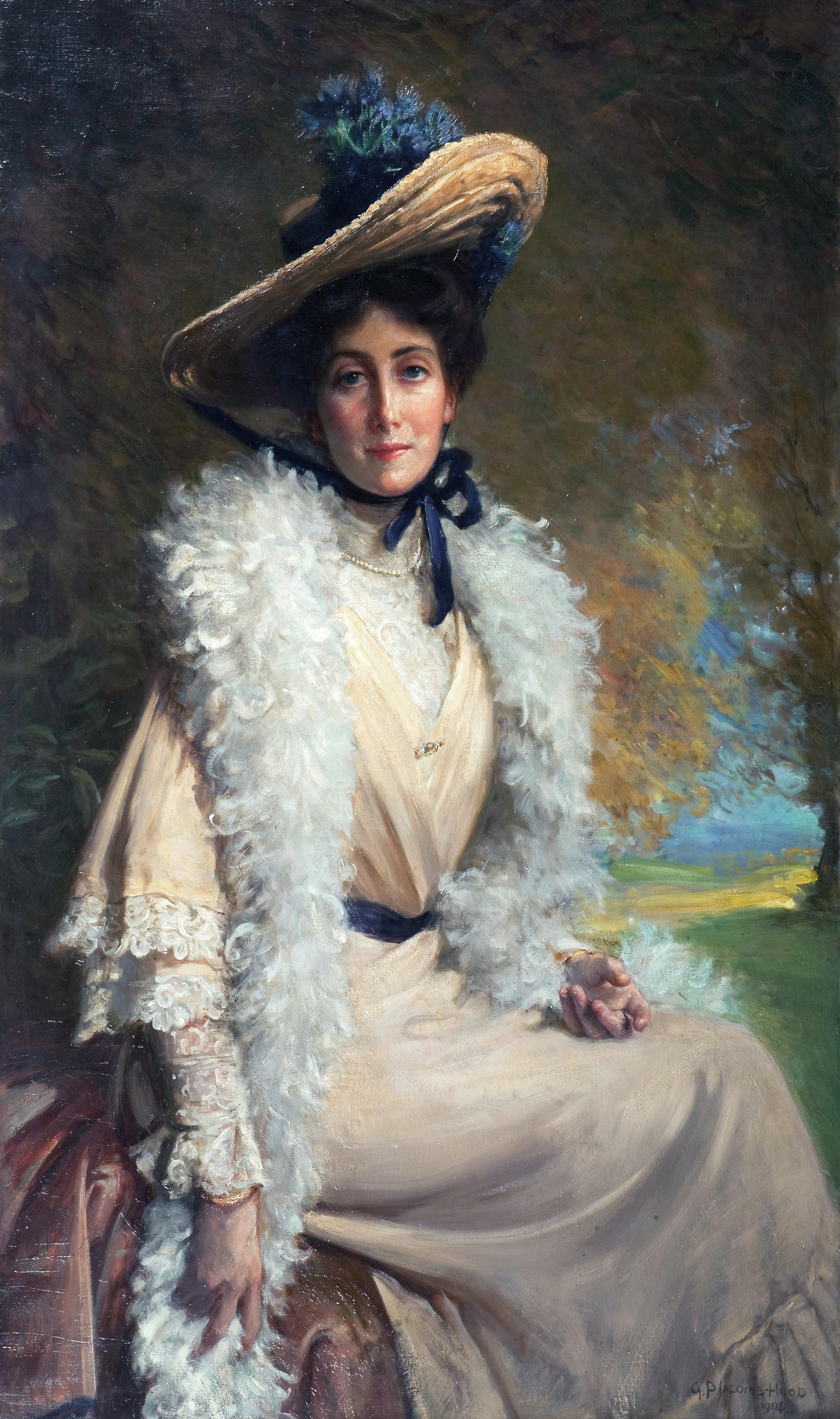
Maud Frith, by George Percy Jacomb-Hood, 1904

Walter Frith (29 July 1856, London – 25 July 1941, Putney) was an English barrister, author, and drama critic.

Walter Frith, a son of the famous painter William Powell Frith, was educated at Harrow and then at Trinity Hall, Cambridge, where he graduated B.A. 1879, LL.B. 1879, and M.A. 1882. He was admitted to Inner Temple on 25 January 1876 and called to the Bar on 9 June 1880. He wrote fourteen plays and three novels.

A well-regarded man of letters, Frith was a member of the exclusive Athenaeum Club. His literary output is mainly numerous melodramatic plays, and he was for many years the drama critic of Pall Mall.

In 1898 he married Maud Law, widow of Rev. W. Law. One of Walter Frith's sisters was Jane Ellen Panton.

== Novels ==
- In Search of Quiet. 1895.
- The Sack of Monte Carlo. 1897.
- The Tutor's Love Story. 1904.
