= The Bridge of Sighs (poem) =

1844 poem by Thomas Hood

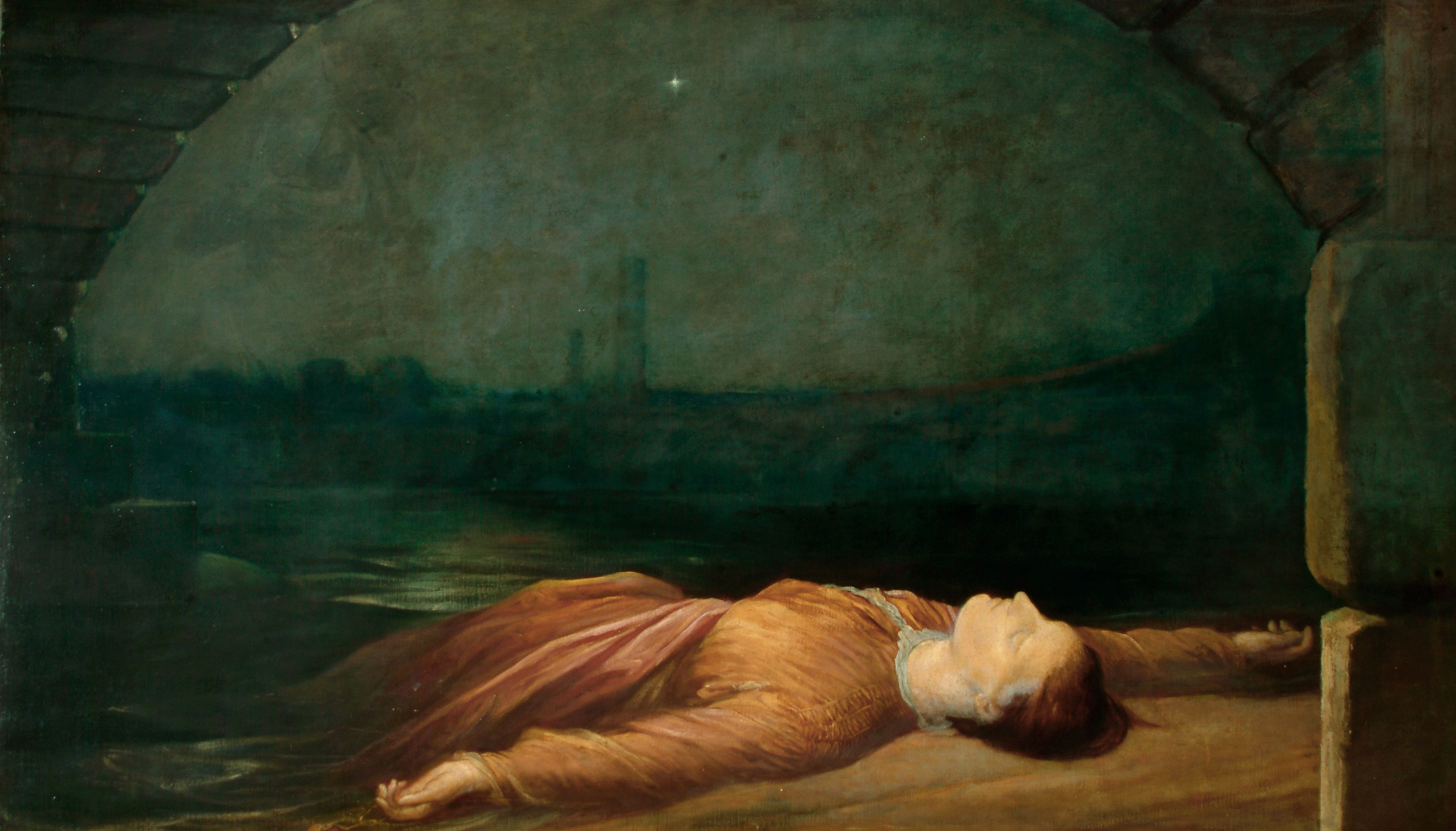
One illustration based on the poem: Found Drowned, George Frederic Watts, c. 1850

"The Bridge of Sighs" is an 1844 poem by Thomas Hood concerning the suicide of a homeless young woman who threw herself from Waterloo Bridge in London.

== Background ==
Although Thomas Hood (1799–1845) is usually regarded as a humorous poet, towards the end of his life, when he was on his sick bed, he wrote a number of poems commenting on contemporary poverty. These included "The Song of the Shirt", "The Bridge of Sighs" and "The Song of the Labourer". "The Bridge of Sighs" is particularly well-known because of its novel meter, complex three syllable rhymes, varied rhyming scheme and pathetic subject matter.

The poem describes the woman as having been immersed in the grimy water, but having been washed so that whatever sins she may have committed are obliterated by the pathos of her death. She seems to have become a suicide by jumping off a bridge, after she was thrown out of her home.

Make no deep scrutiny
Into her mutiny
Rash and undutiful:
Past all dishonour,
Death has left on her
Only the beautiful.

Several clues in the poem, which harps upon beauty, sins and scorn, hint that the woman was pregnant and had been thrown out of her home.

Sisterly, brotherly,
Fatherly, motherly
Feelings had changed:
Love, by harsh evidence,
Thrown from its eminence;
Even God's providence
Seeming estranged.

== Illustrations ==
The poem was widely anthologised and frequently illustrated in books of Victorian poetry, including an etching by Sir John Everett Millais in 1858. It was also set to music by Reinhold Ludwig Herman (1849–1919). Along with Hood's other notable serious poem, "The Song of the Shirt", it influenced several Victorian artists. Paintings inspired by the poem included Augustus Egg's Past and Present (1858; Tate, London), Abraham Solomon's untraced Drowned! Drowned! and G.F. Watts's Found Drowned (Watts Gallery, Compton, Surrey). The poem was also illustrated in a bas-relief on Hood's tomb.

== Popular culture ==
Michael Jackson is rumoured to have written the song Little Susie, when he was around 19 years of age, in the late 1970s. Exploring similar subject matter, Jackson quotes some of the poem's lines in the song.
