= The Travelling Companions =

Painting by Augustus Egg

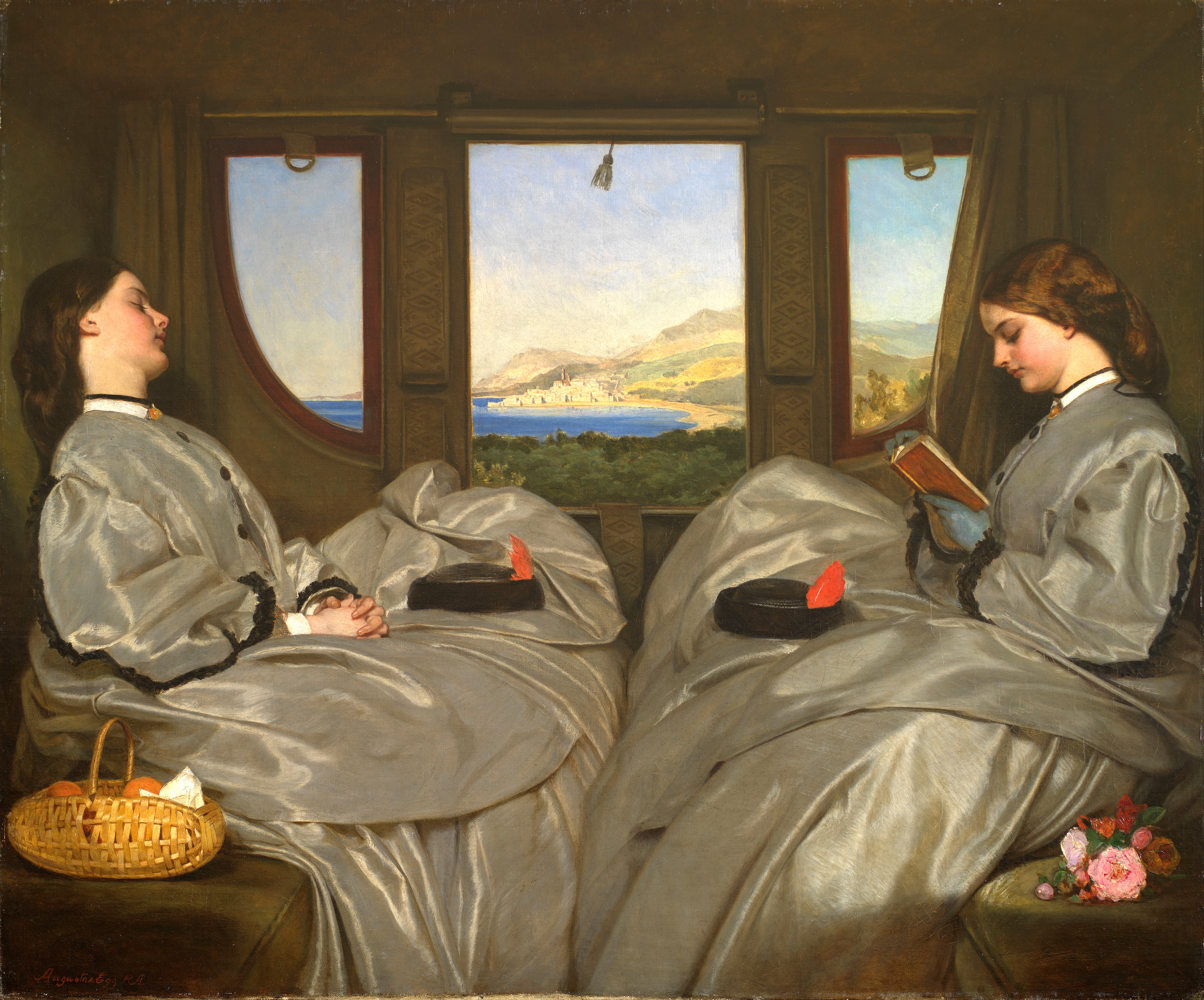
Augustus Leopold Egg, The Travelling Companions, 1862, oil-on-canvas, 65.3 × 78.7 centimetres (25.7 × 31.0 in), Birmingham Museum and Art Gallery

The Travelling Companions is an 1862 oil-on-canvas painting by British artist Augustus Leopold Egg.

It is held by Birmingham Museum and Art Gallery, presented by the John Feeney Charitable Trust in 1956.

== Content ==
The painting measures 65.3 × 78.7 centimetres (25.7 × 31.0 in). It depicts two well-dressed women who are sitting facing each other in a cramped first-class railway carriage, like mirror images. The women may be sisters, or may represent two elements of the character of one woman.

The women are dressed identically, in the same voluminous grey silk travelling clothes, with their hats identically placed on their laps. They are arranged symmetrically on seats to either side of the carriage window. The window has three parts, framing the view like a triptych. The coastline of Menton, on the French Riviera, is visible through the window, but neither woman seems to be paying any attention to this. The train is in motion, witnessed by the swinging tassel on the window blind. The carriage itself is symmetrical, as the women are.

The symmetry is broken, however, by a number of small differences. The woman on the right reads a book; her hair is tied up, she is wearing gloves and a bouquet of flowers lies next to her. The red feather in her hat is neatly groomed. The woman opposite her is sleeping, her hair loose, with bare hands, and a basket of fruit beside her. The feather in her hat is a little ragged.

== Making ==
Egg travelled frequently to the south of England and the south of France, seeking relief from his life-long asthma.

It was one of the last paintings made by Egg before his death in 1863.

== Influences ==
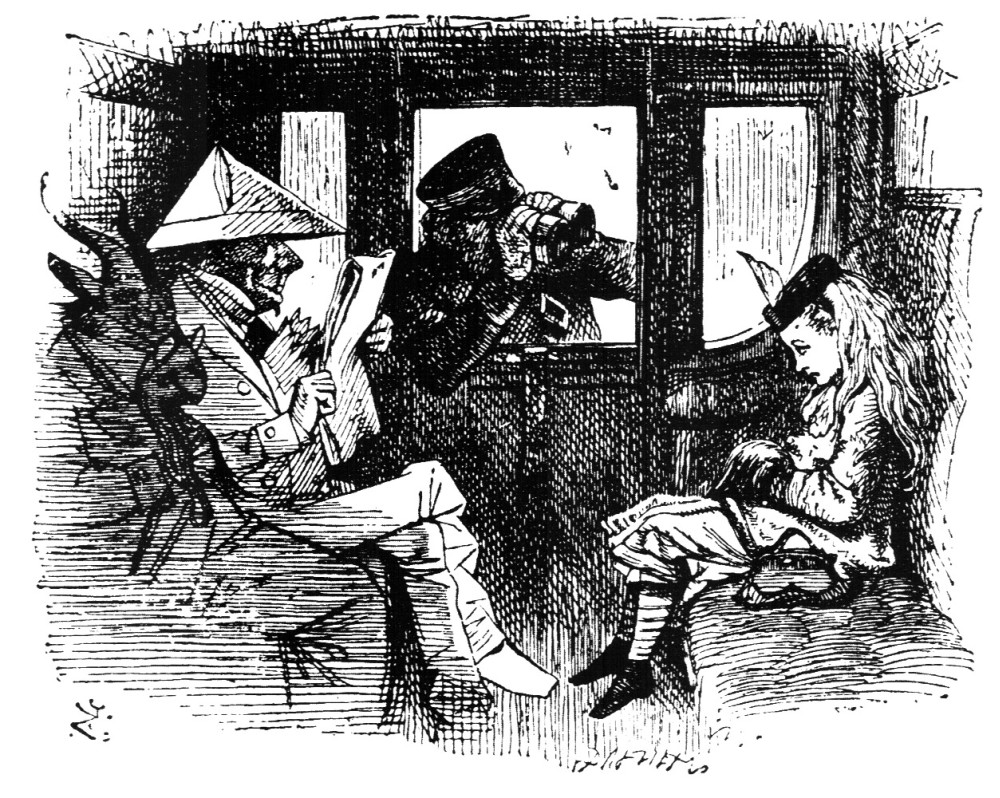
Wood-engraving after John Tenniel from Through the Looking-Glass

Railway art became popular after William Powell Frith's 1862 painting The Railway Station.

The painting influenced an illustration by John Tenniel in Through the Looking-Glass, in which Alice wears a similar costume and hat in a railway carriage, sitting opposite Benjamin Disraeli, wearing a paper hat, and a goat. Leonor Fini's painting, Le Train Blanc (1966), was also influenced by this Augustus Egg work.
