= Found (Rossetti) =

Painting by Dante Gabriel Rossetti

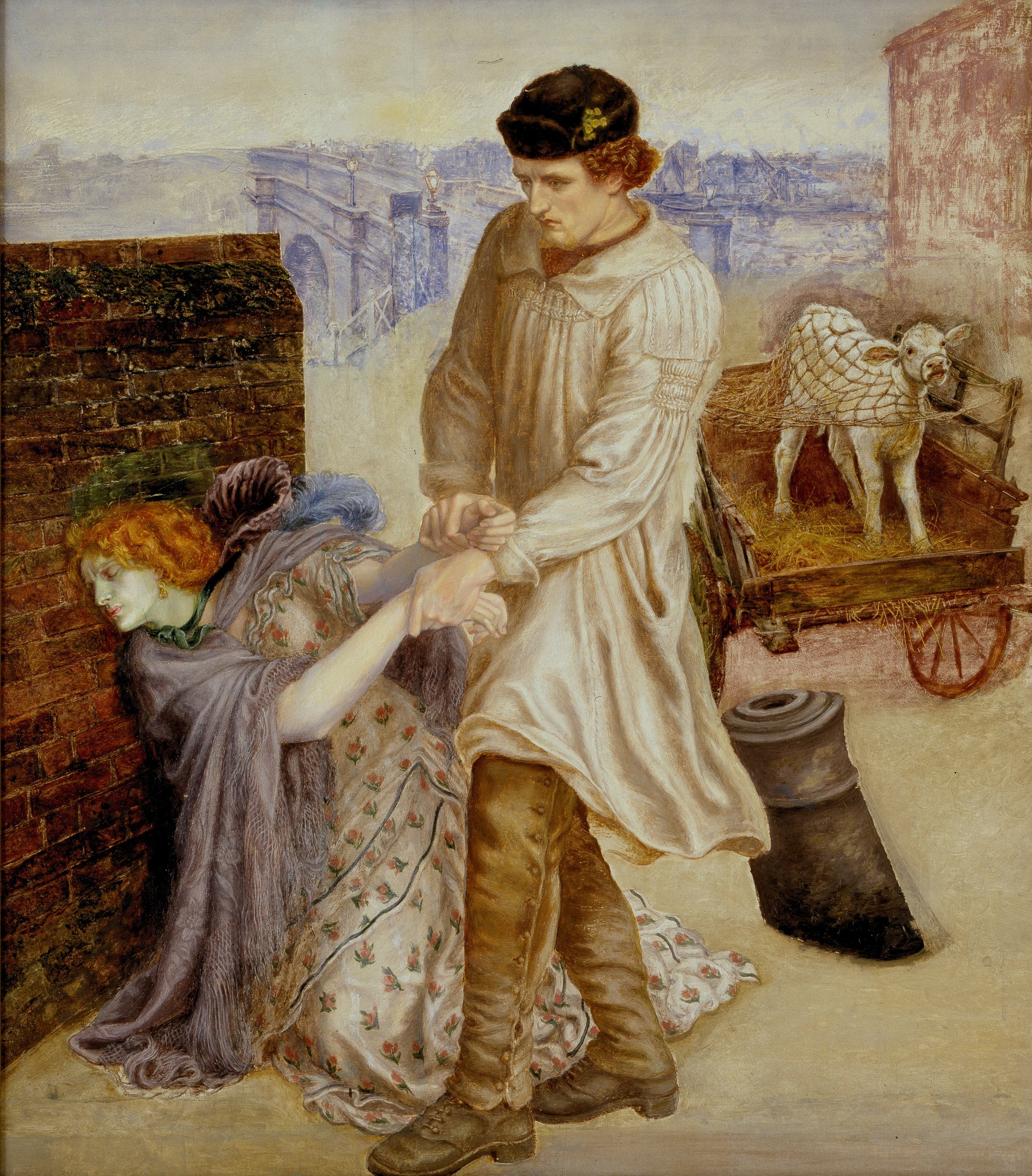
- Artist: Dante Gabriel Rossetti
- Year: 1854–1855, 1859–1881
- Medium: Oil on canvas
- Dimensions: 91.4 cm × 80 cm (36.0 in × 31 in)
- Location: Delaware Art Museum, Wilmington

Found is an unfinished oil painting by Dante Gabriel Rossetti, now in the Delaware Art Museum. The painting is Rossetti's only treatment in oil of a contemporary moral subject, urban prostitution, and although the work remained incomplete at Rossetti's death in 1882, he always considered it one of his most important works, returning to it many times from the mid-1850s until the year before his death.

== History ==
External audio
- Found by Dante Gabriel Rossetti, Delaware Art Museum

Unlike the majority of Rossetti's work of the 1850s, which were small-scale drawings and watercolours characterised by medieval and early Renaissance revivalism, Found was Rossetti's only attempt at a contemporary subject, prostitution, that was done in oils.

Rossetti had addressed the topic of prostitution as early as 1847 in letters to his friend William Bell Scott, who wrote the poem Rosabell in 1846 (later known as Maryanne) on the topic. The Gate of Memory, a drawing Rossetti made c. 1854, shows a scene from Rosabell where a prostitute is beginning her evening of work, and views a group of innocent girls "still at play" dancing. The drawing may have been intended to illustrate the poem in a book, but was painted as a larger watercolour in 1857, which was repainted in 1864. In 1870 Rossetti published a sympathetic poem about a prostitute, Jenny.

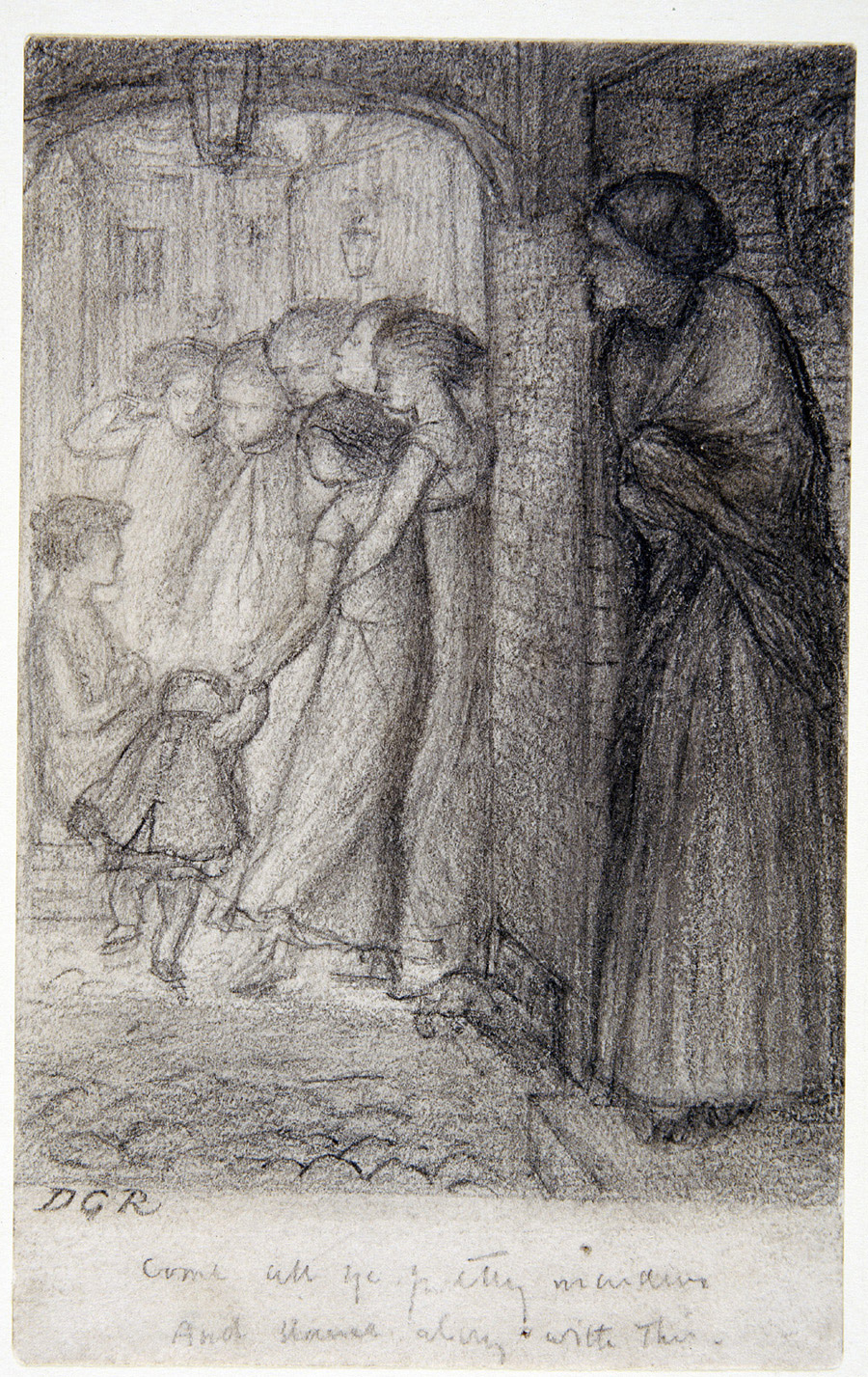
The Gate of Memory, c. 1854

The artist Alexander Munro's maid Ellen Frazer may have posed for an early head-study for the fallen country girl of Found, and an ink-and-wash study of the composition (now in the British Museum) is dated 1853. Rossetti began work on the painting in the autumn of 1854; this is probably the unfinished version now in Carlisle.

On 30 September 1853 Rossetti wrote to his mother and sister describing the type of wall, cart and calf that he wished for them to find as models so that he could begin the painting. The unfinished Carlisle version consists only of these three elements, plus the head of Fanny Cornforth, apparently added later. Ford Madox Brown noted in his diary Rossetti's difficulties in painting the calf in November 1854, "he paints it in all like Albert Durer (sic) hair by hair & seems incapable of any breadth ... From want of habit I see nature bothers him—but it is sweetly drawn & felt."

The calf's role in the painting is two-fold. First, it explains why the farmer has come to the city. But more importantly, its situation as "an innocent animal trapped and on its way to be sold" parallels the woman's and raises questions on the woman's state of mind. "Is the prostitute rejecting salvation or is she accepting it; or is she repentant but unable to escape her fate, like the calf?"

In 1855, Rossetti described his work-in-progress in a letter to William Holman Hunt:

I can tell you, on my own side, of only one picture fairly begun—indeed, I may say, all things considered, rather advanced; but it is only a small one. The subject had been sometime designed before you left England and will be thought, by any one who sees it when (and if) finished, to follow in the wake of your "Awakened Conscience," but not by yourself, as you know I had long had in view subjects taking the same direction as my present one. The picture represents a London street at dawn, with the lamps still lighted along a bridge which forms the distant background. A drover has left his cart standing in the middle of the road (in which, i. e. the cart, stands baa-ing a calf tied on its way to market), and has run a little way after a girl who has passed him, wandering in the streets. He has just come up with her and she, recognising him, has sunk under her shame upon her knees, against the wall of a raised churchyard in the foreground, while he stands holding her hands as he seized them, half in bewilderment and half guarding her from doing herself a hurt. These are the chief things in the picture which is to be called "Found," and for which my sister Maria has found me a most lovely motto from Jeremiah ... The calf, a white one, will be a beautiful and suggestive part of the thing, though I am far from having painted him as well as I hoped to do.

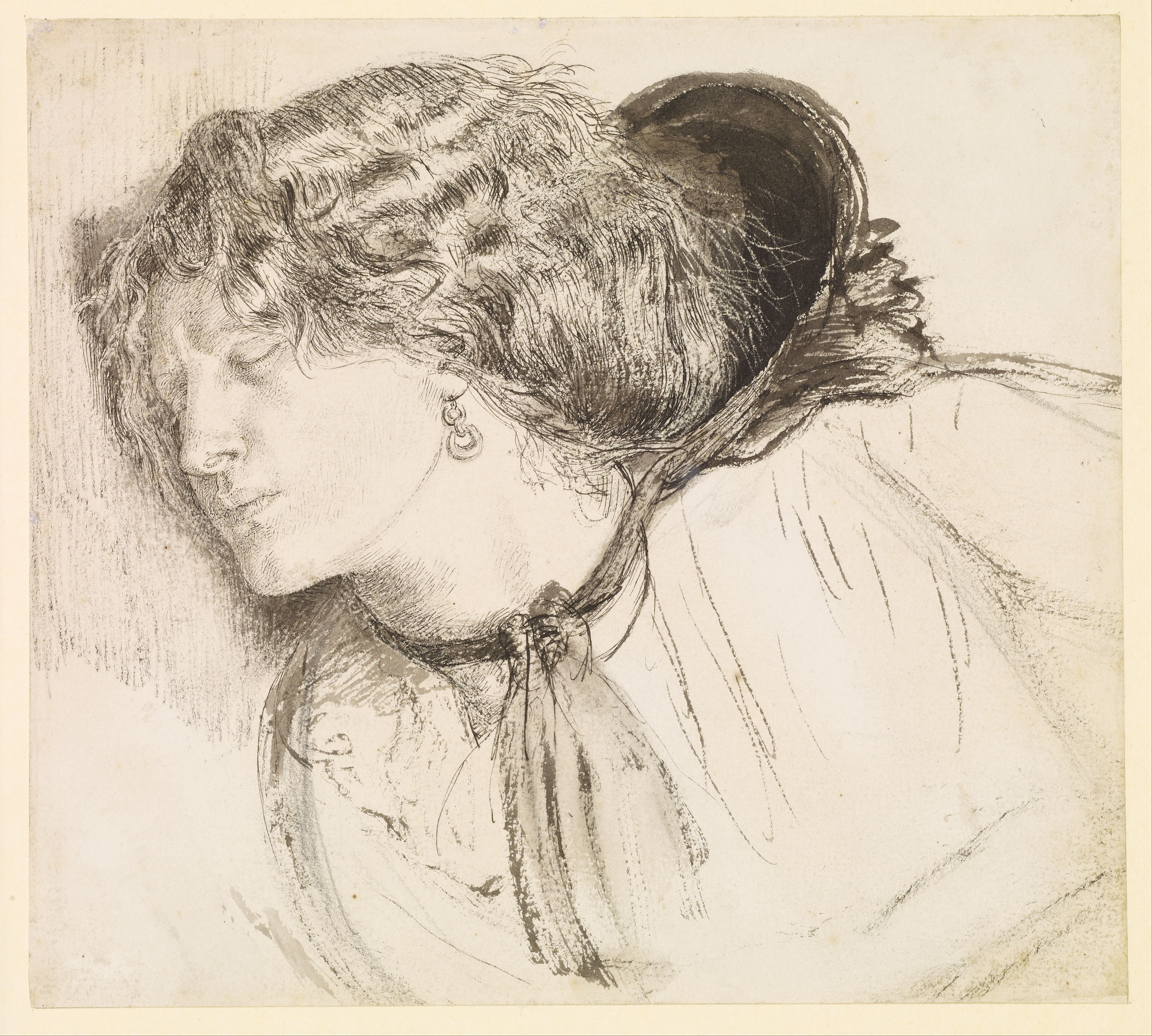
Study for the head of the girl, 1858. Ink on paper. Model: Fanny Cornforth. (Birmingham Museum and Art Gallery)

The motto from Jeremiah 2:2 reads "I remember Thee; the kindness of thy youth, the love of thy betrothal." and appears on two early compositional studies. Rossetti replaced the word "espousal" in the motto as he found it with "betrothal", which he felt better translated the sense of the original Hebrew.

In 1858, Rossetti met Fanny Cornforth, who soon became his mistress. She later described how he invited her to his studio and "put my head against the wall and drew it for the head of the calf picture". He made several pen and ink drawings about this time of the heads of both the male and female subjects. A version in oils was commissioned in 1859 by James Leathart, and this version, with the face of Fanny Cornforth, is the painting now in the Delaware Art Museum. Rossetti struggled with Found, abandoning and returning to it intermittently until at least 1881, and leaving it unfinished at his death. His assistants Henry Treffry Dunn and Frederic Shields both helped with the painting, and Dunn and Edward Burne-Jones may have worked on it after Rossetti's death.

Rossetti published a poem, also titled "Found", as a companion to the painting in 1881 in the volume Ballads and Sonnets.

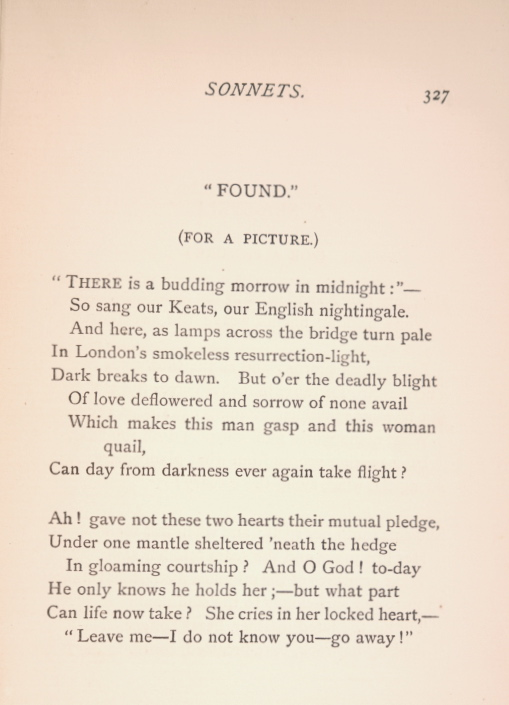

== Studies ==
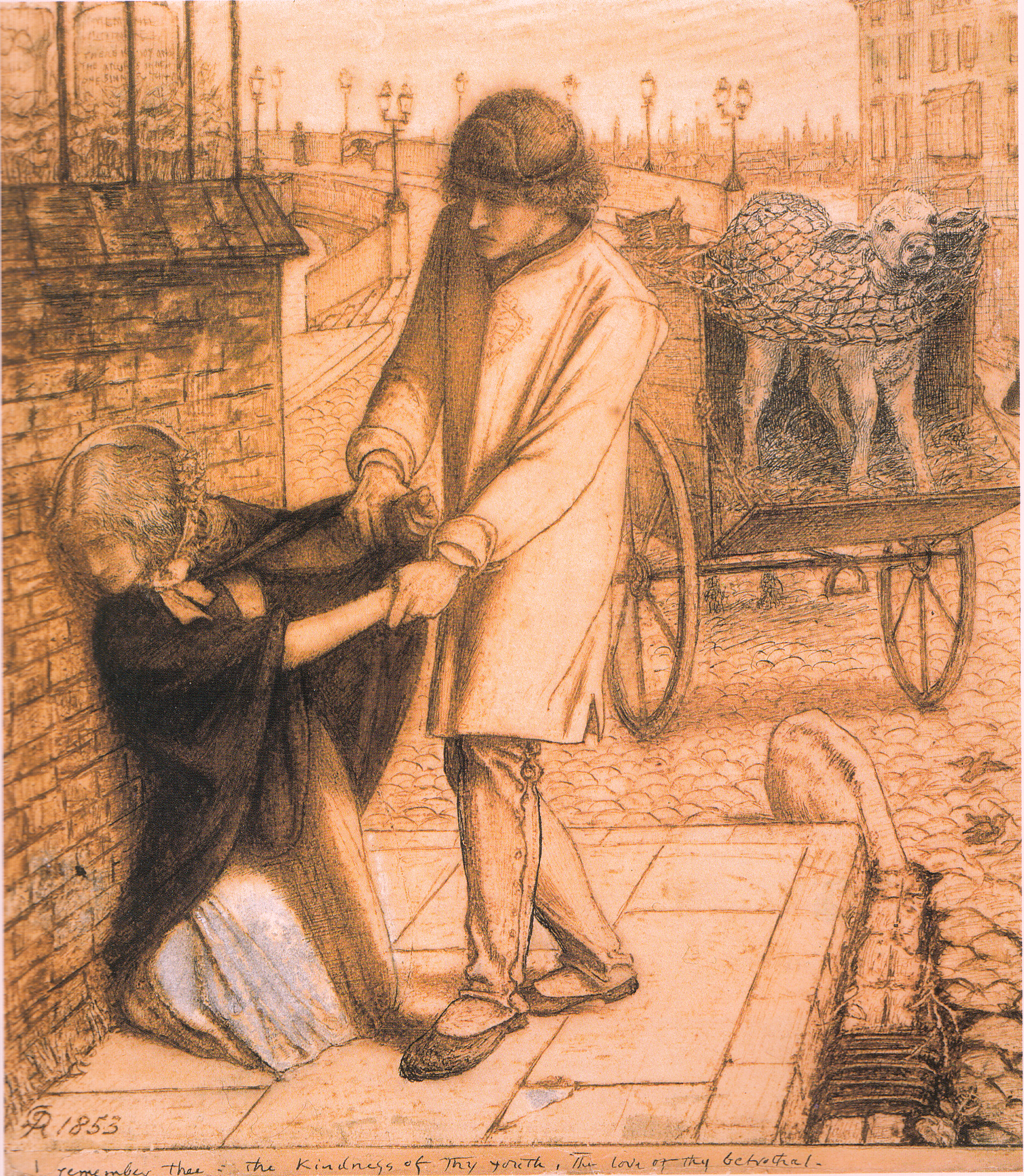
Study for Found, dated 1853. Black and brown ink with white heightening on paper. (The British Museum)

A number of studies for Found have survived. The earliest may be the black and brown ink sketch now in the British Museum, which is signed and dated 1853. The Birmingham Museum and Art Gallery has a compositional sketch in pen and black ink dated to 1854–55 as well as a pen and ink drawing of the head of the girl modelled by Fanny Cornforth.

== Ownership and exhibitions ==
The painting was first commissioned by Francis McCracken but the commission was dropped because of lack of progress on the painting. Next James Leathart, then William Graham commissioned the work. Graham only took possession of the unfinished work after Rossetti's death. Graham's estate sold the work in 1886, presumably to Frederick Richards Leyland and it was sold again at Leyland's estate sale, held at Christie's on 28 May 1892.

Samuel Bancroft, a textile mill owner from Wilmington, Delaware, bought the painting at the estate sale. He bought at least four other Rossetti paintings at the same time and later accumulated one of the largest collections of Pre-Raphaelite art outside of the United Kingdom. Found is considered the most important picture in Bancroft's extensive collection and was prominently displayed above Bancroft's desk in his home. The Bancroft estate donated the collection in 1935 to the Delaware Art Museum in Wilmington.

The painting was exhibited in London in 1883, at Rossetti's memorial exhibition, and again in 1892. Following the 1883 exhibition at the Royal Academy, Lewis Carroll noted that the farmer's face showed a combination "of pain and pity, condemnation and love, which is one of the most marvellous things I have ever seen done in painting."

While Bancroft's house in Wilmington was being expanded to hold his new paintings in 1892, Found was exhibited in nearby Philadelphia at the Pennsylvania Academy of the Fine Arts and in New York at the Century Club. It has also been exhibited in London and Birmingham (1973), New Haven (1976), Richmond, Virginia (1982), and in London, Liverpool, Moscow (2013) and Amsterdam (2003).

== See also ==
- List of paintings by Dante Gabriel Rossetti
- Fallen woman
