= Augustus Leopold Egg =

British artist (1816–1863)

Augustus Leopold Egg RA
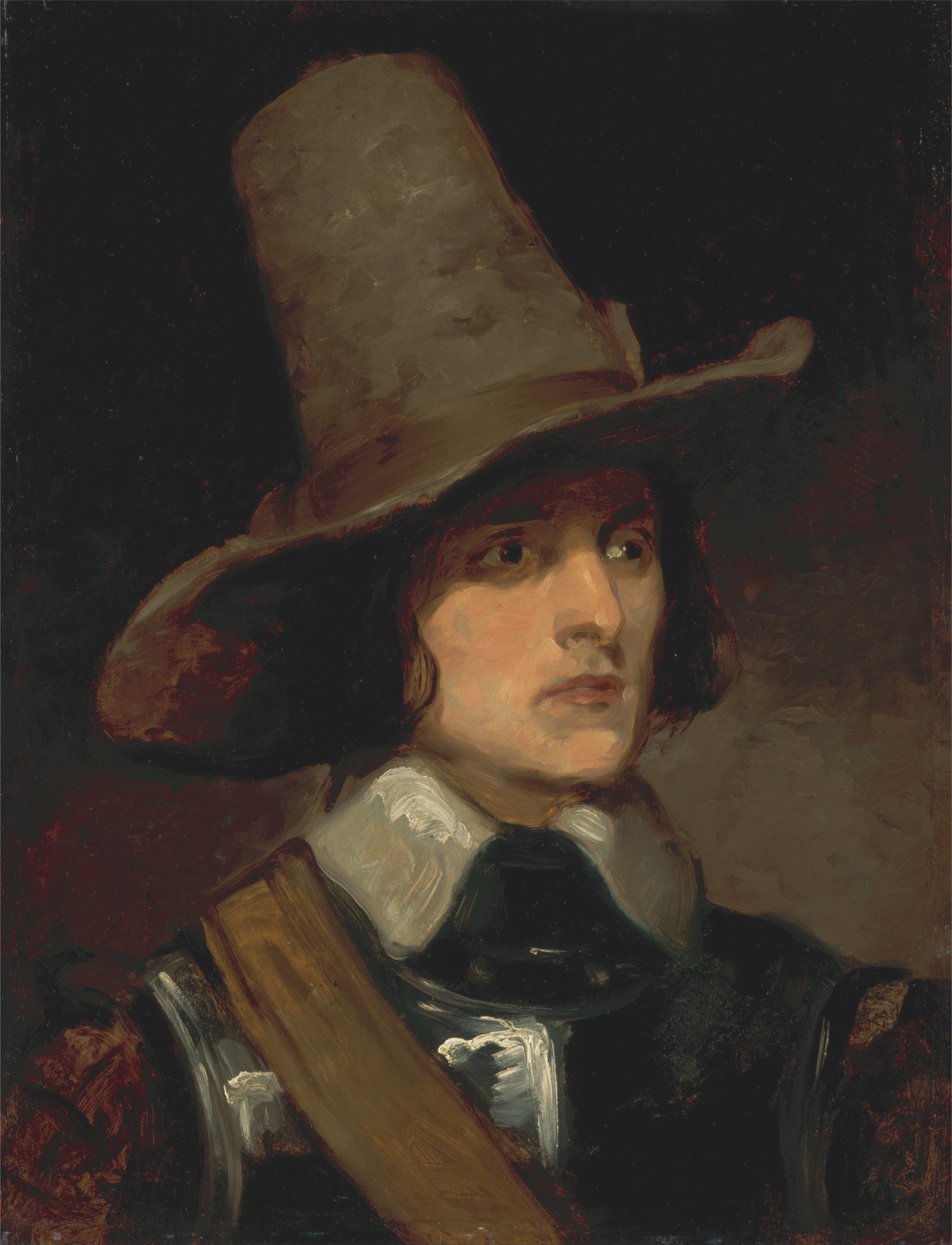
- Augustus Egg by Richard Dadd (between 1838 and 1840)
- Born: 2 May 1816
- Died: 26 March 1863 (aged 46)
- Movement: The Clique
- Elected: Royal Academy of Arts

Augustus Leopold Egg RA (2 May 1816 – 26 March 1863) was a British Victorian artist, and member of The Clique best known for his modern triptych Past and Present (1858), which depicts the breakup of a middle-class Victorian family.

== Biography ==
Egg was born in London to Joseph and Ann Egg, and baptised in St James's Church, Piccadilly, on 30 May 1816. He had an elder brother, George Hine Egg.

His father Joseph Egg was a wealthy gunsmith from the distinguished gun making family, who immigrated to London from Huningue, Alsace. Egg was educated in the schools of the Royal Academy, beginning in 1836. Egg was a member of The Clique, a group of artists founded by Richard Dadd and others in the late 1830s (c. 1837). Egg sought to combine popularity with moral and social activism, in line with the literary work of his friend Charles Dickens. With Dickens he set up the "Guild of Literature and Art", a philanthropic organisation intended to provide welfare payments to struggling artists and writers. He acted the lead role in "Not So Bad As We Seem," a play written by Edward Bulwer-Lytton to raise funds for the organisation. His self-portrait in the role is in Hospitalfield House in Arbroath.

Egg's early paintings were generally illustrations of literary subjects. Like other members of The Clique, he saw himself as a follower of Hogarth. His interest in Hogarthian moral themes is evidenced in his paired paintings The Life and Death of Buckingham, depicting the dissolute life and sordid death of the Restoration rake George Villiers, 2nd Duke of Buckingham. Yet his paintings often took a humorous look at their subjects, as in his Queen Elizabeth Discovers she is no longer Young (1848).

== Style ==
Unlike most other members of The Clique, Egg also admired the Pre-Raphaelites; he bought work from the young William Holman Hunt and shared ideas on colour theory with him. His own triptych, known as Past and Present, was influenced by Hunt's work. The triptych depicted three separate scenes, one portraying a prosperous middle-class family and the other two depicting poor and isolated figures – two young girls in a bedsit and a homeless woman with a baby. The viewer was expected to read a series of visual clues that linked together these three scenes, to reveal that the prosperous family in the central scene is in the process of disintegrating because of the mother's adultery. The two outer scenes depict the separated mother and children a few years later, now living in poverty. The painting's use of flashback – the central scene is occurring in the past – has been seen as a precursor of cinema.

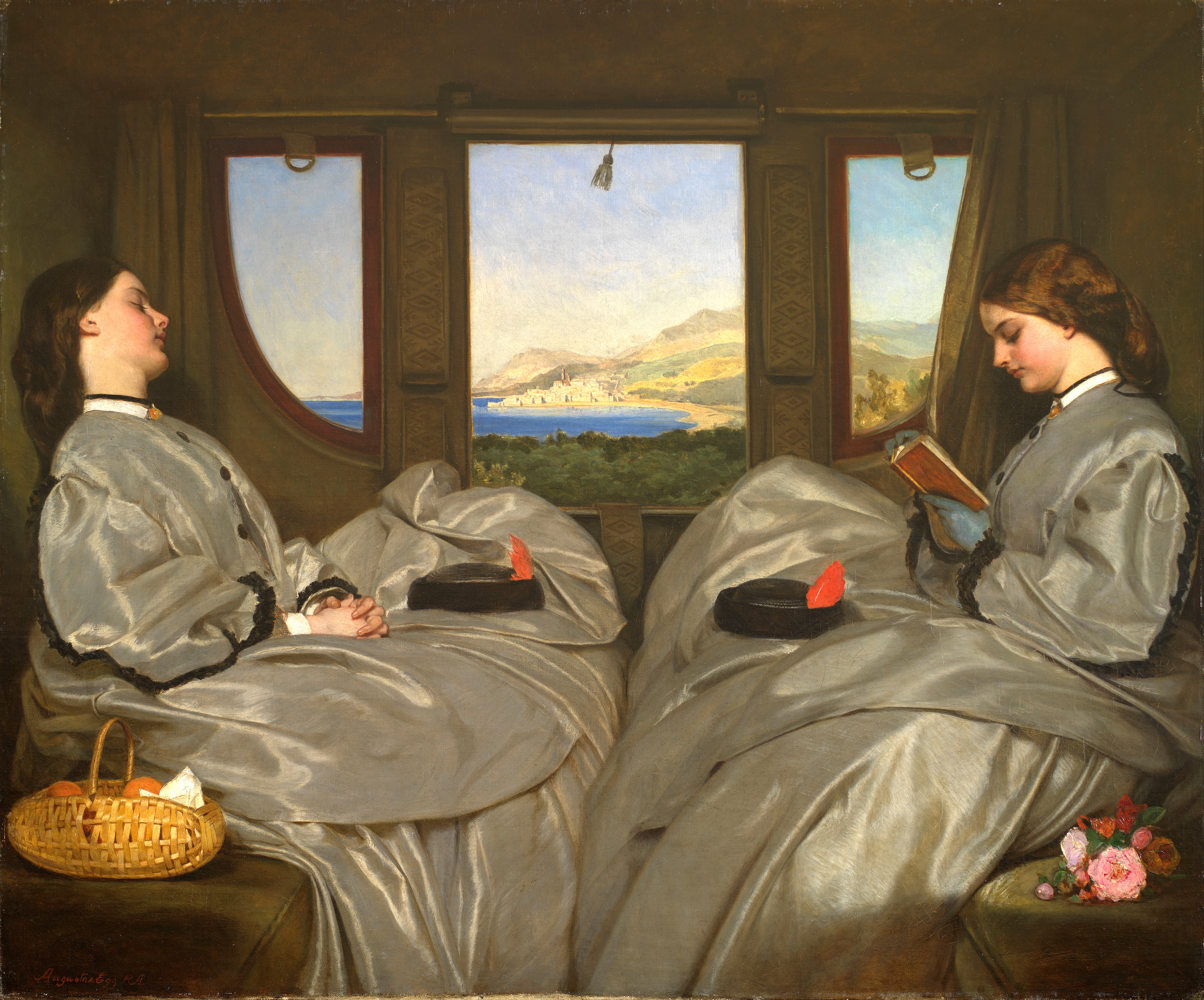
The Travelling Companions, 1862 (Birmingham Museum and Art Gallery)

Egg was also an active organiser of exhibitions, being admired by fellow-artists for his dedication and fair mindedness. He was one of the organisers of the Manchester Art Treasures Exhibition in 1857. He was elected to the Royal Academy in 1860.

Always in poor health, Egg spent his later years in the warmer climate of continental Europe, where he painted Travelling Companions, an ambiguous image of two near-identical young women that has sometimes been interpreted as an attempt to represent two sides of the same person. A member of the circle of friends that included Dickens and Wilkie Collins, Egg features in their surviving correspondence. He participated, as actor and costume designer, in their amateur theatricals, which were often conducted for charitable purposes as noted above. In January 1857 he took a part in Collins's play The Frozen Deep, which starred Dickens and was performed at his home, Tavistock House (Egg played John Want, the ship's cook.) The production was also acted before Queen Victoria and then performed for charity. Dickens described Egg as a "dear gentle little fellow", "always sweet-tempered, humorous, conscientious, thoroughly good, and thoroughly beloved."

Egg died in Algiers on 26 March 1863.

In a 1953 radio interview, novelist Evelyn Waugh was asked "What painters do you admire most?" He answered "Augustus Egg I’d put among the highest."

== Gallery ==
=== Past and Present – 1858 triptych ===
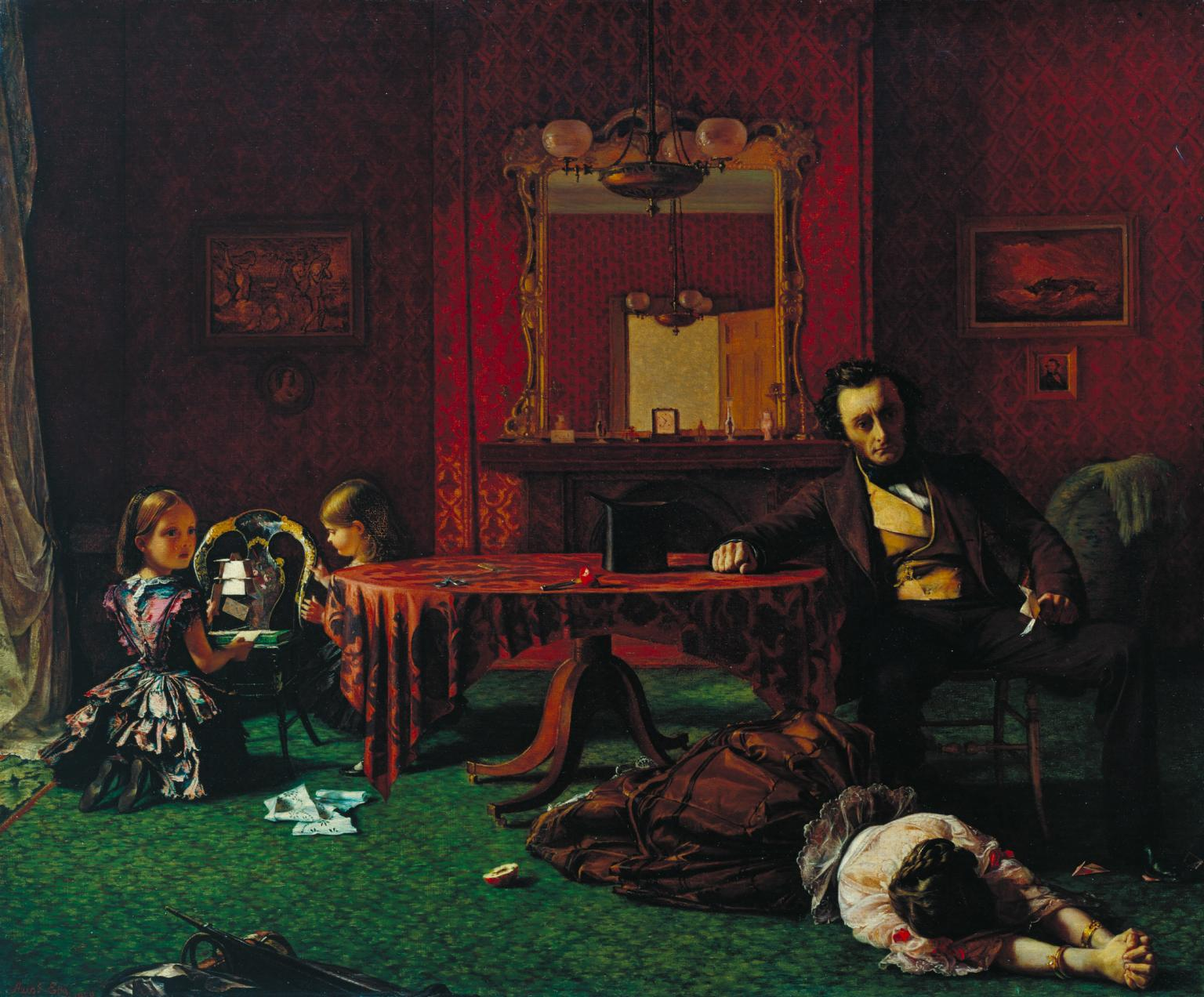
No. 1 – Misfortune, 1858

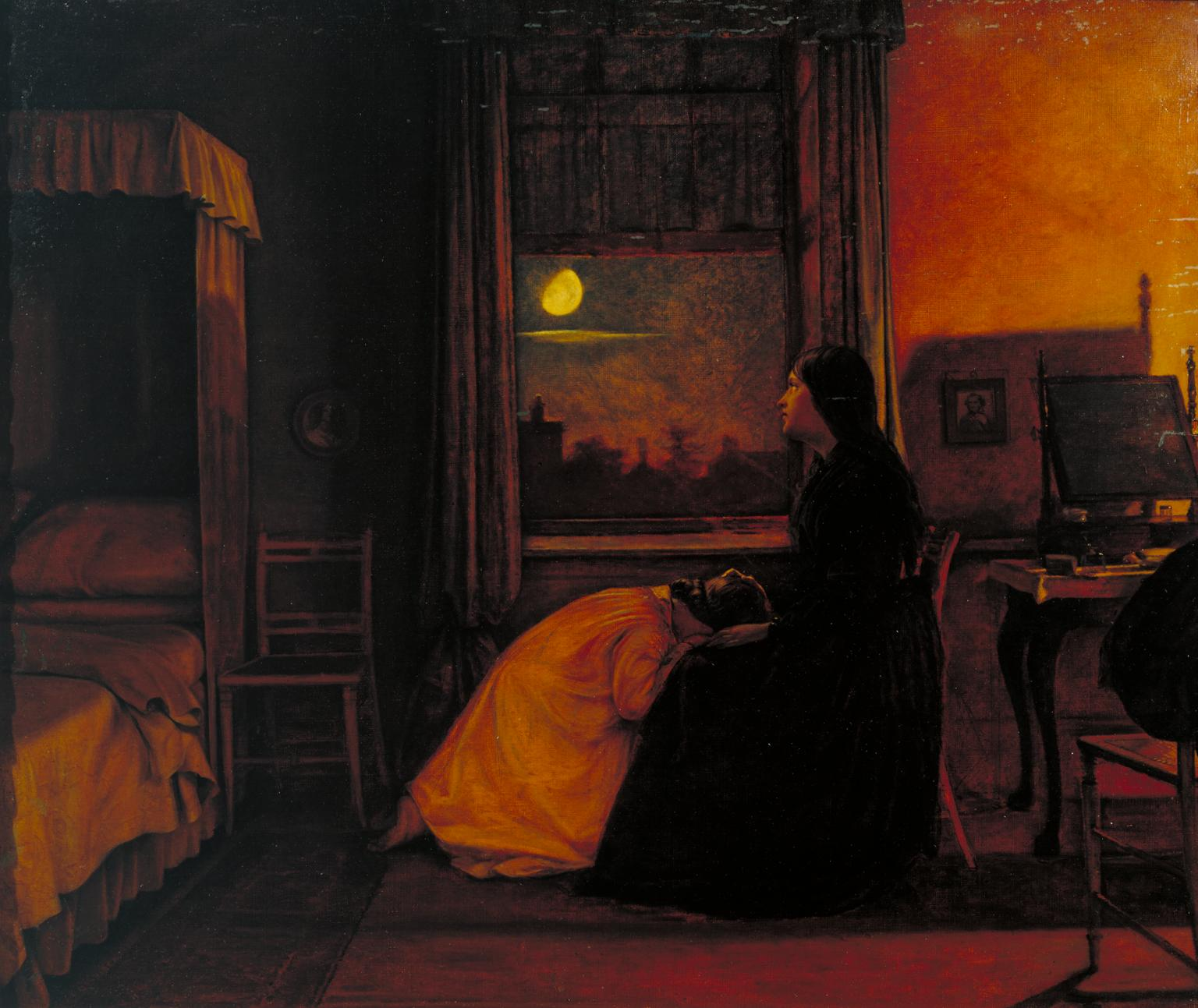
No. 2 – Prayer, 1858

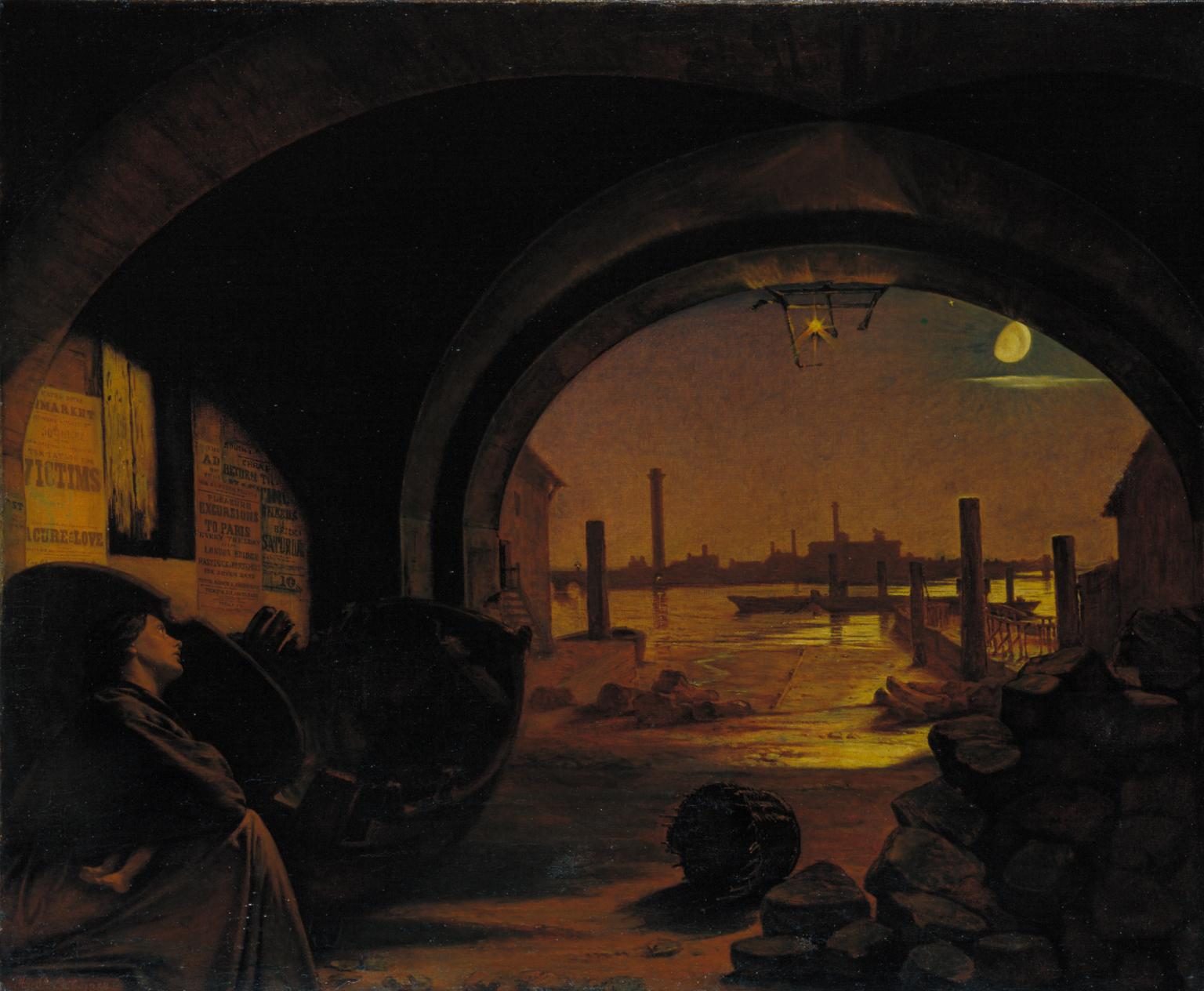
No. 3 – Despair, 1858

=== Select paintings ===
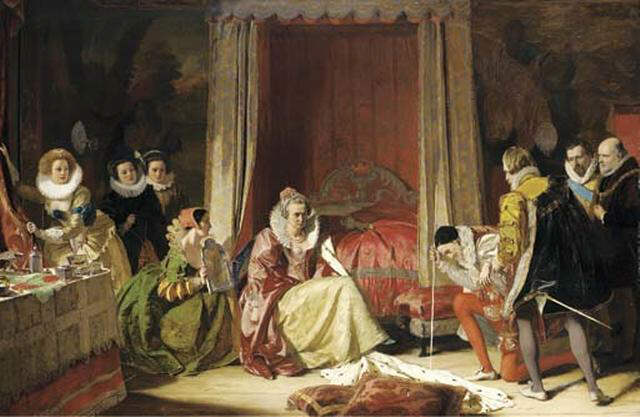
Queen Elizabeth discovers she is no longer young, 1848

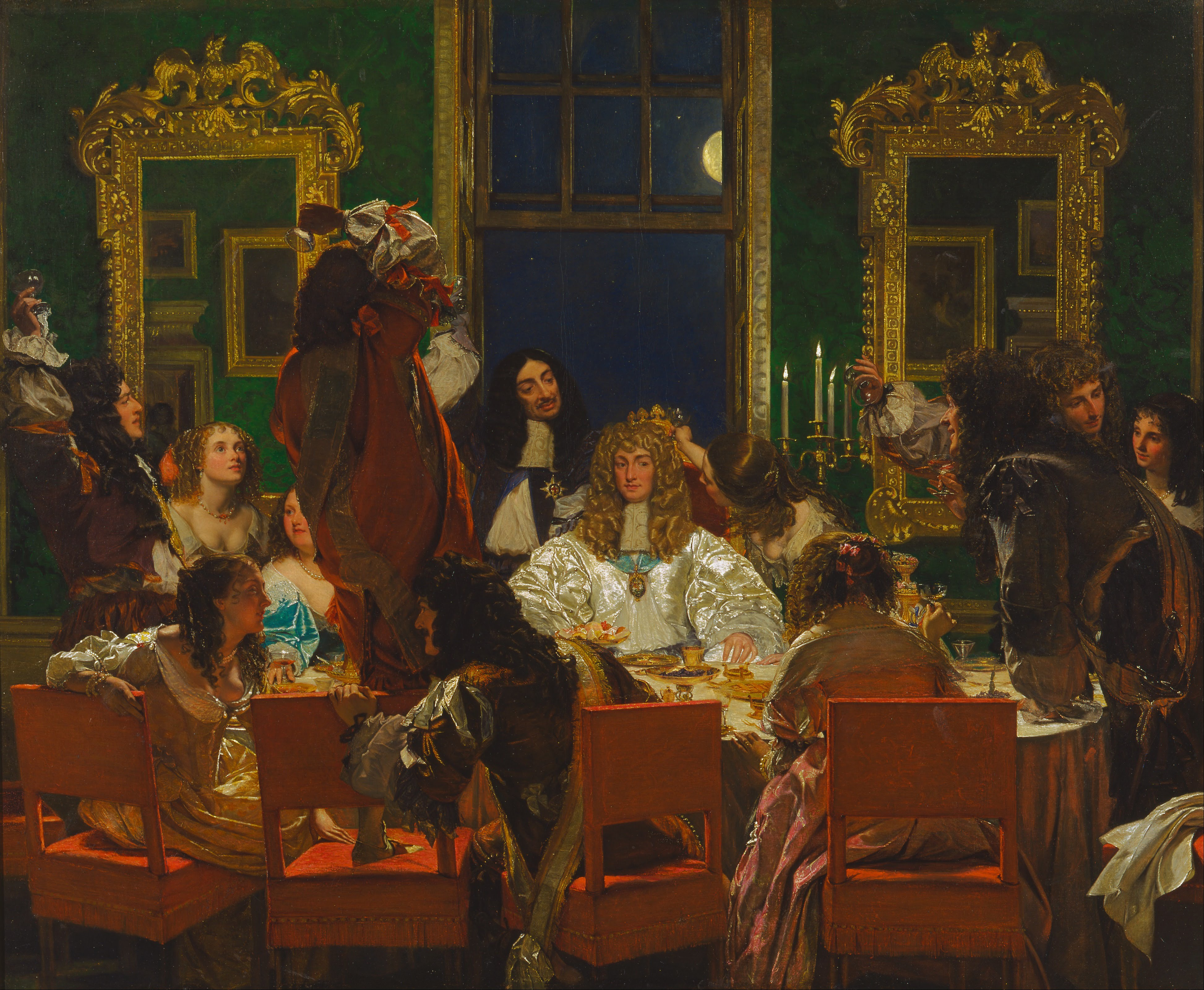
The Life and Death of Buckingham: The Life of Buckingham, c. 1855

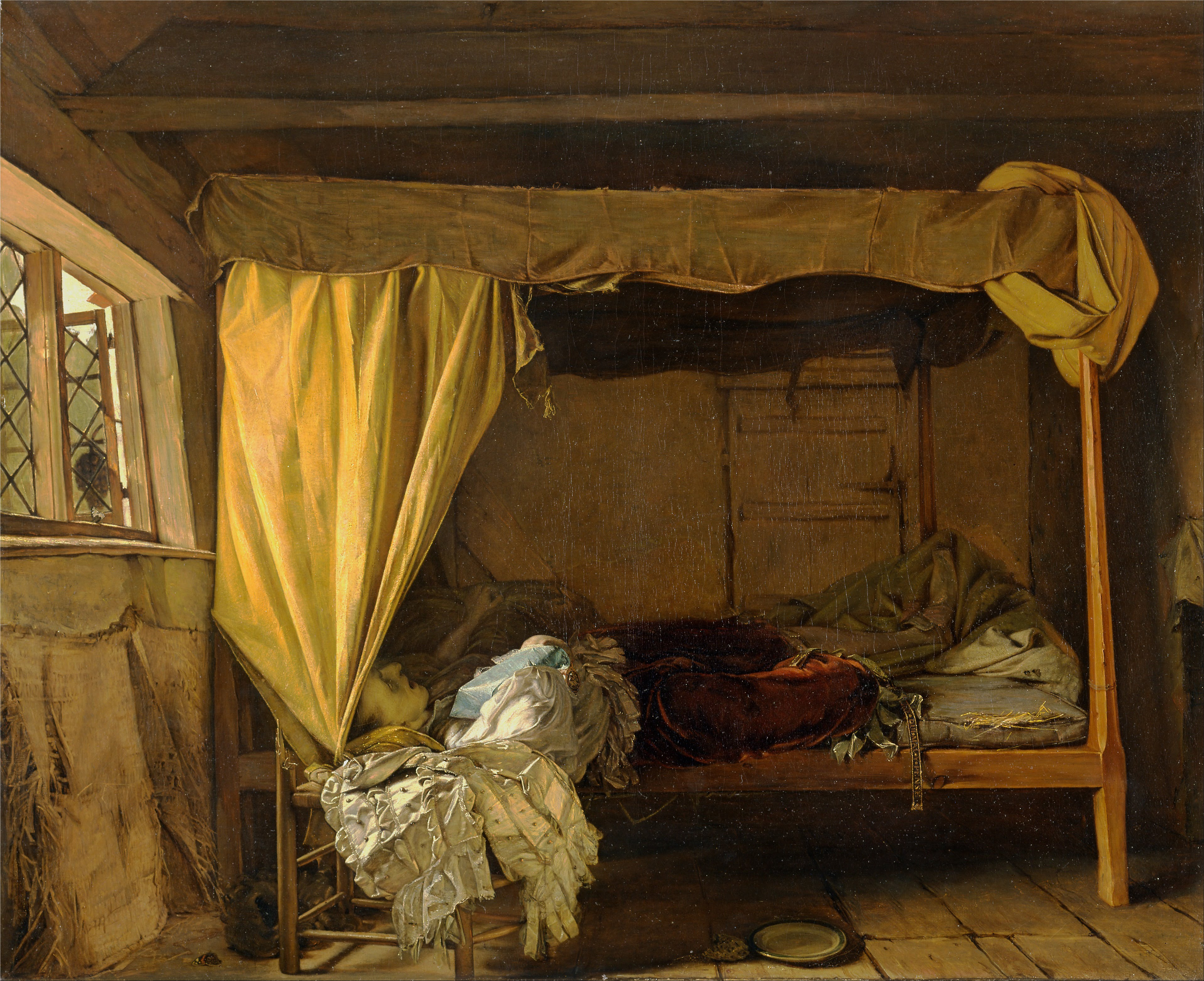
The Life and Death of Buckingham: The Death of Buckingham, c. 1855

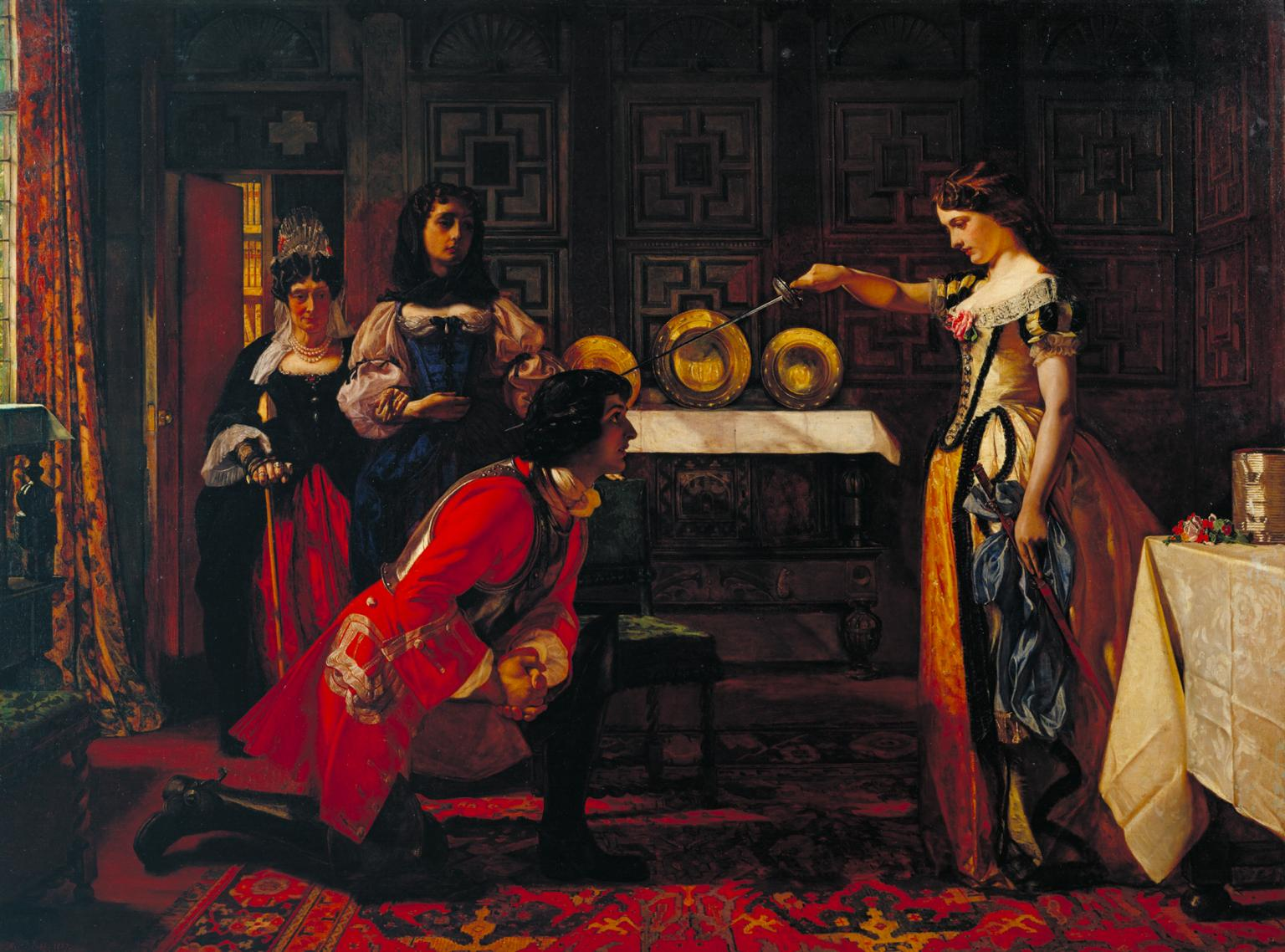
Beatrix Knighting Esmond, 1857

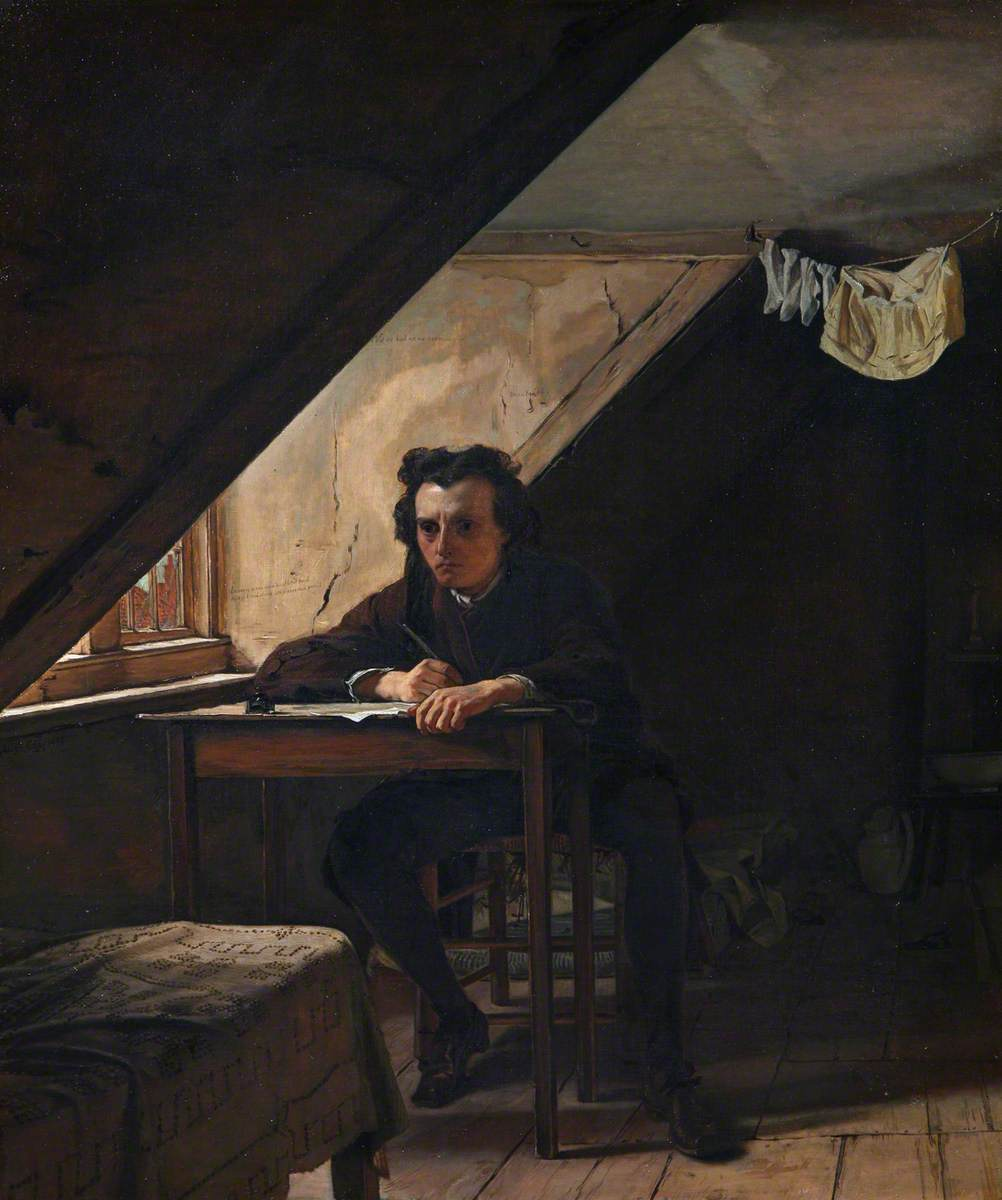
Self Portrait as a Distressed Poet, 1858

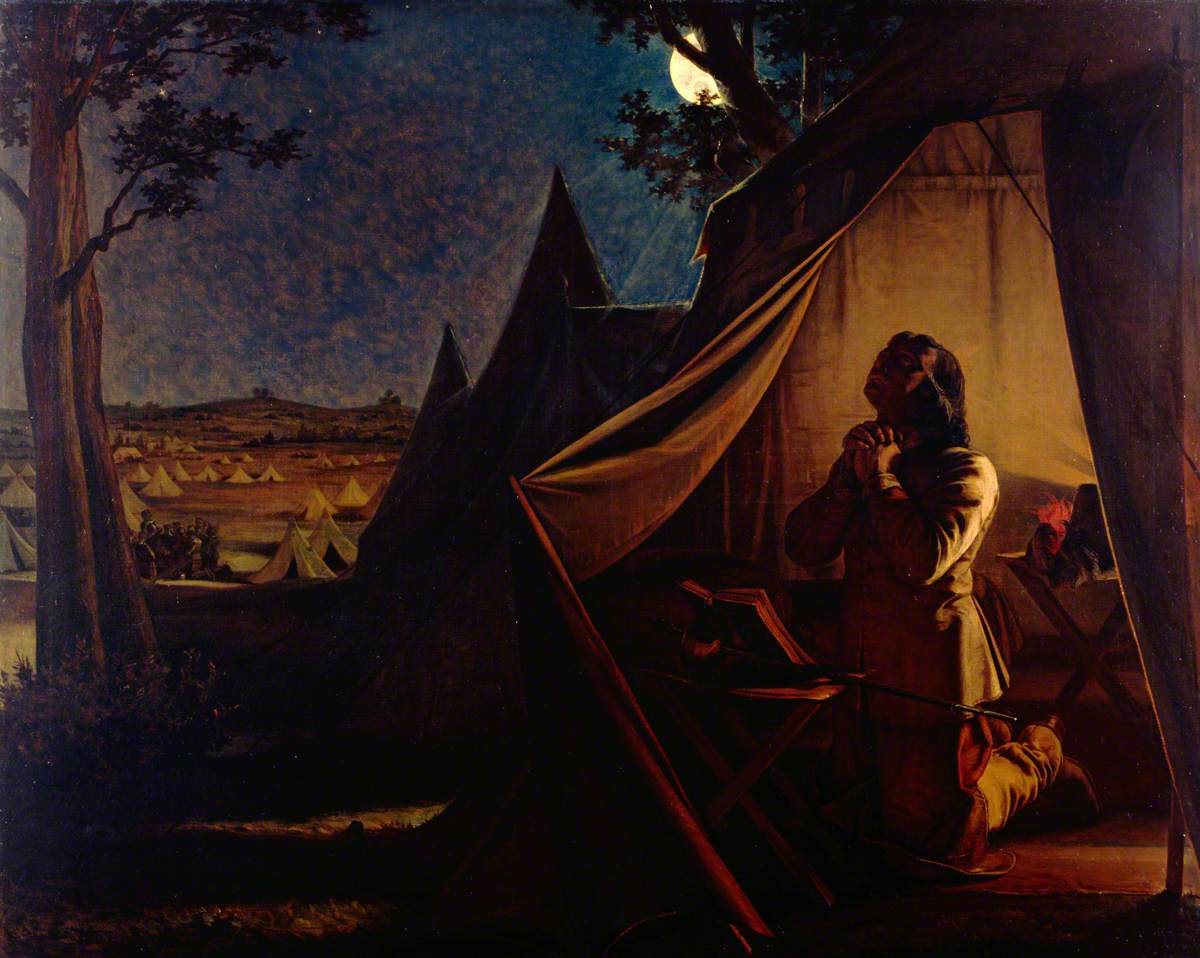
The Night Before Naseby, 1859

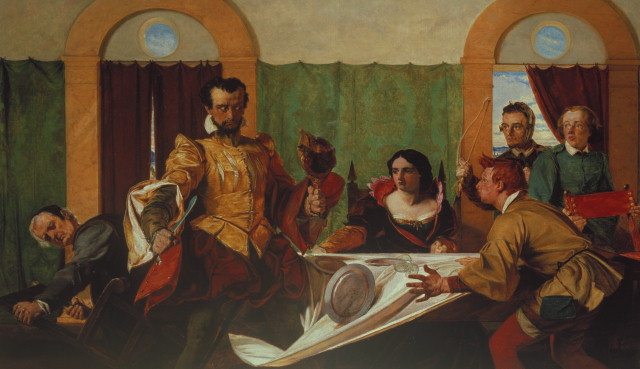
Taming of the Shrew, 1860

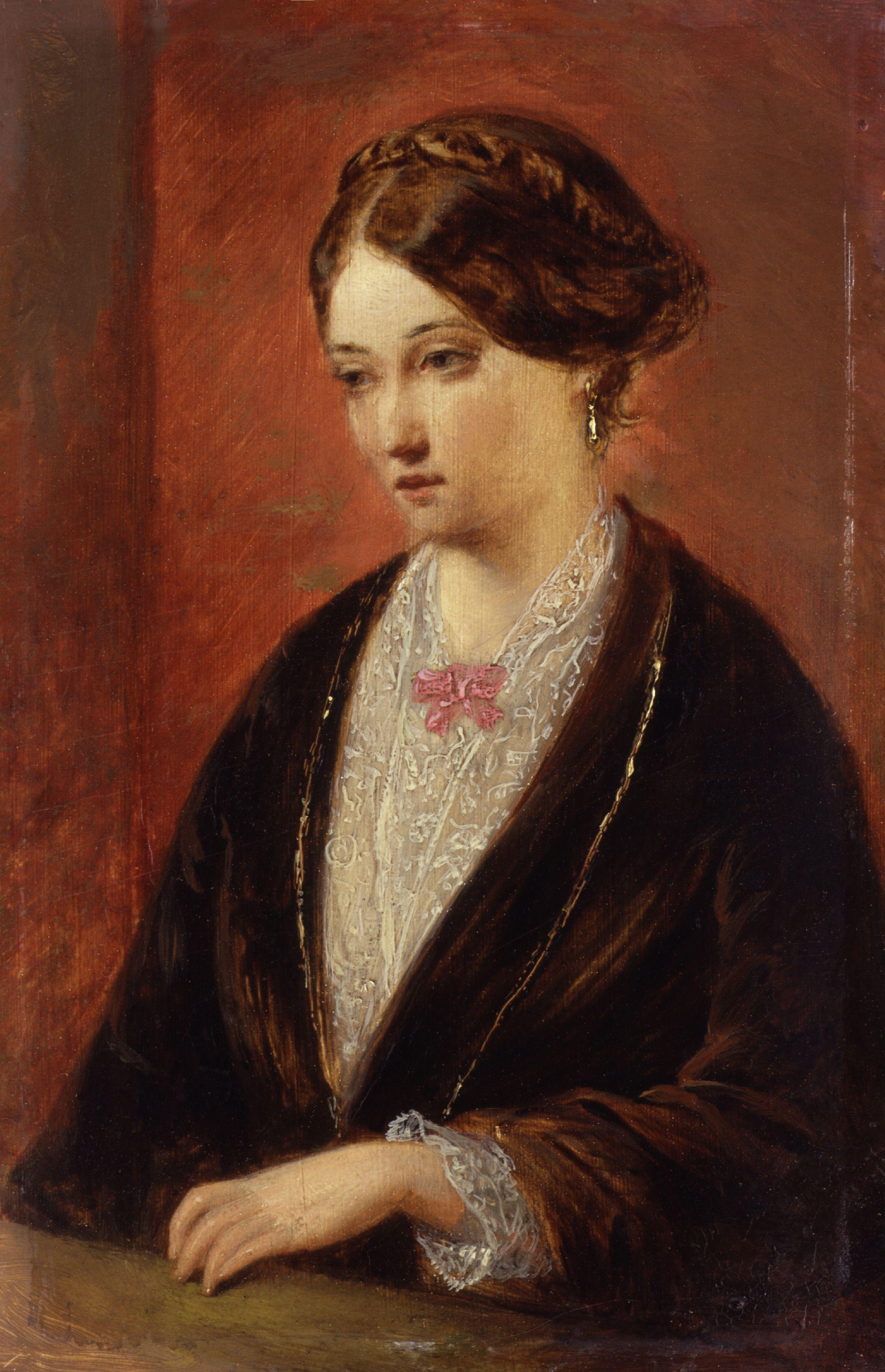
Unknown woman, formerly known as Florence Nightingale

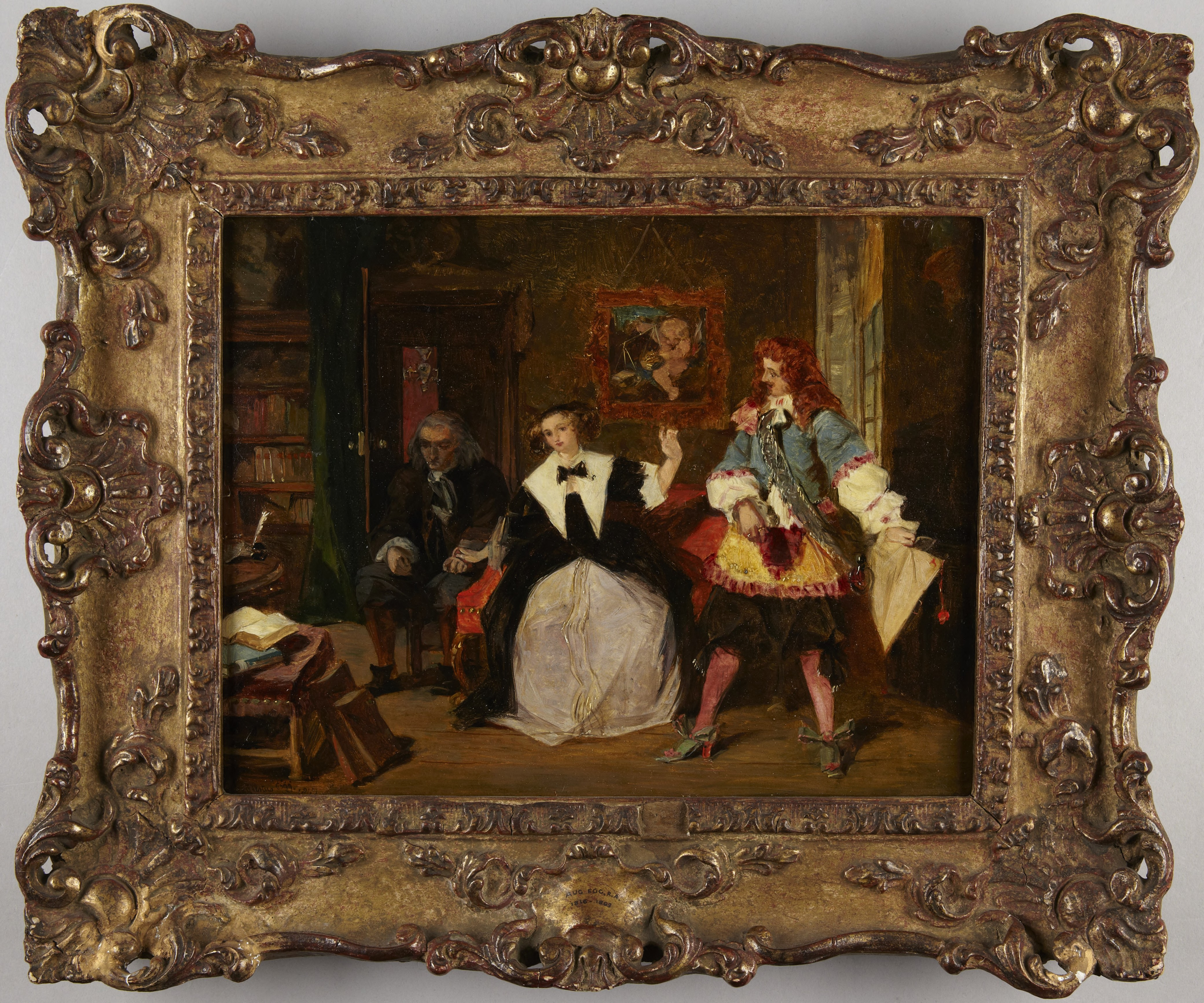
Madame de Maintenon and Scarron

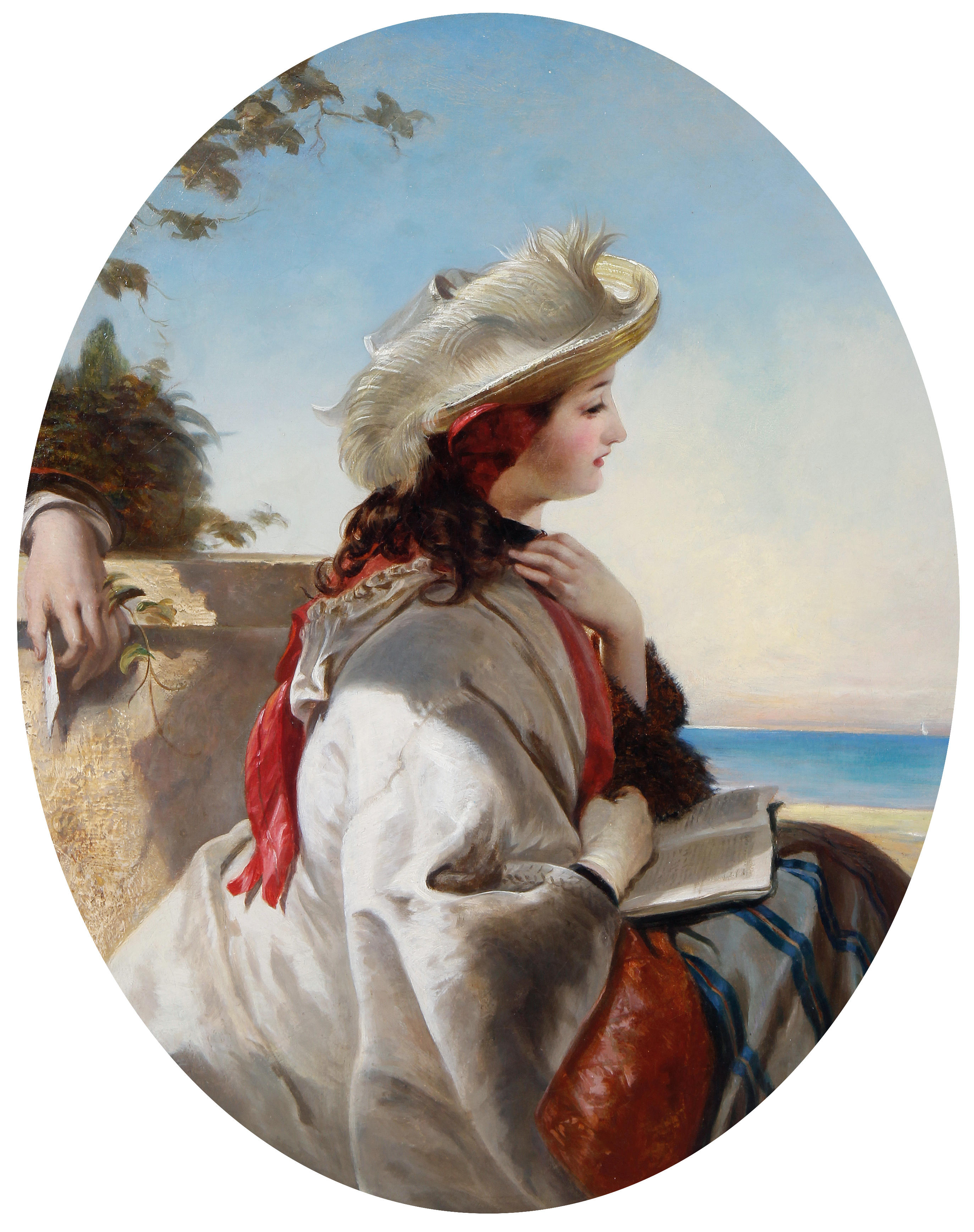
The Love Letter, by 1863
