= The Investiture of Napoleon III with the Order of the Garter =

Painting by Edward Matthew Ward

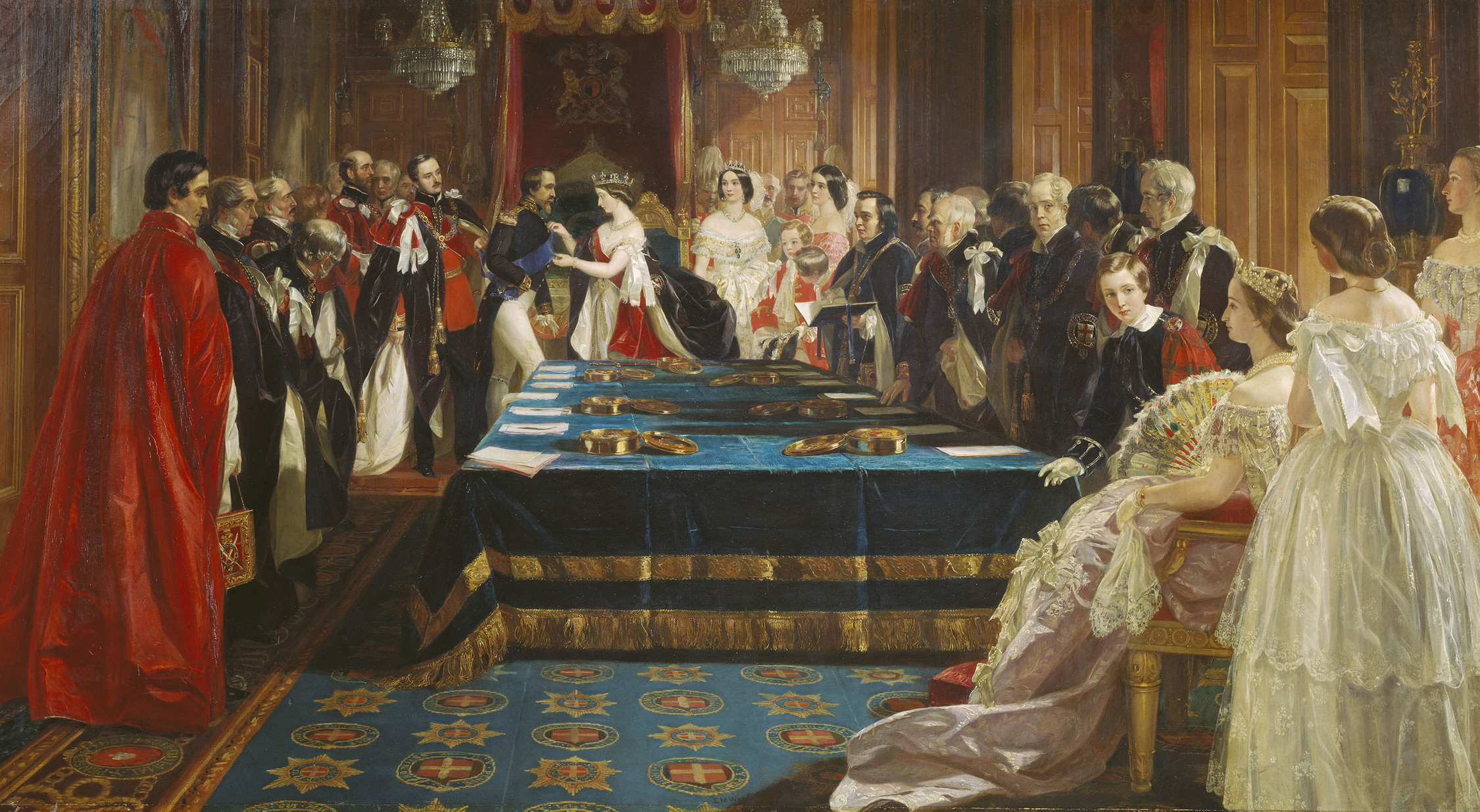
- Artist: Edward Matthew Ward
- Year: 1860
- Type: Oil on canvas, history painting
- Dimensions: 97.3 cm × 176.2 cm (38.3 in × 69.4 in)
- Location: Royal Collection

The Investiture of Napoleon III with the Order of the Garter is an 1860 history painting by the British artist Edward Matthew Ward. It depicts the ceremony at Windsor Castle on 18 April 1855 when the French Emperor Napoleon III was awarded the Order of the Garter by Queen Victoria. This took place at the time of the Emperor's state visit to the United Kingdom at a time when the two countries were allies in the Crimean War. The painting shows the Throne Room of the Castle with an assembled crowd of dignitaries including their consorts Prince Albert and Empress Eugénie as well as Albert Edward, Prince of Wales and Victoria, Princess Royal.

The work was commissioned by Victoria the same year as the visit. The picture was displayed at the Royal Academy Exhibition of 1858 held at the National Gallery along with Queen Victoria at the Tomb of Napoleon showing the British monarch's reciprocal visit to Paris later in 1855. Ward continued to rework the pictures until 1860. Both paintings remain in the Royal Collection today.

== Bibliography ==
- Ames, Winslow. Prince Albert and Victorian Taste. Viking Press, 1968
- Begent, Peter J., Chesshyre, D.H.B. & Jefferson, Lisa. The Most Noble Order of the Garter, 650 Years. Spink, 1988.
- Dafforne, James. The Life and Works of Edward Matthew Ward. Virtue and Company, 1879.
- Lloyd, Christopher. The Royal Collection: A Thematic Exploration of the Paintings in the Collection of Her Majesty the Queen. Sinclair-Stevenson, 1992.
