= Royal Academy Exhibition of 1858 =

1858 art exhibition in London

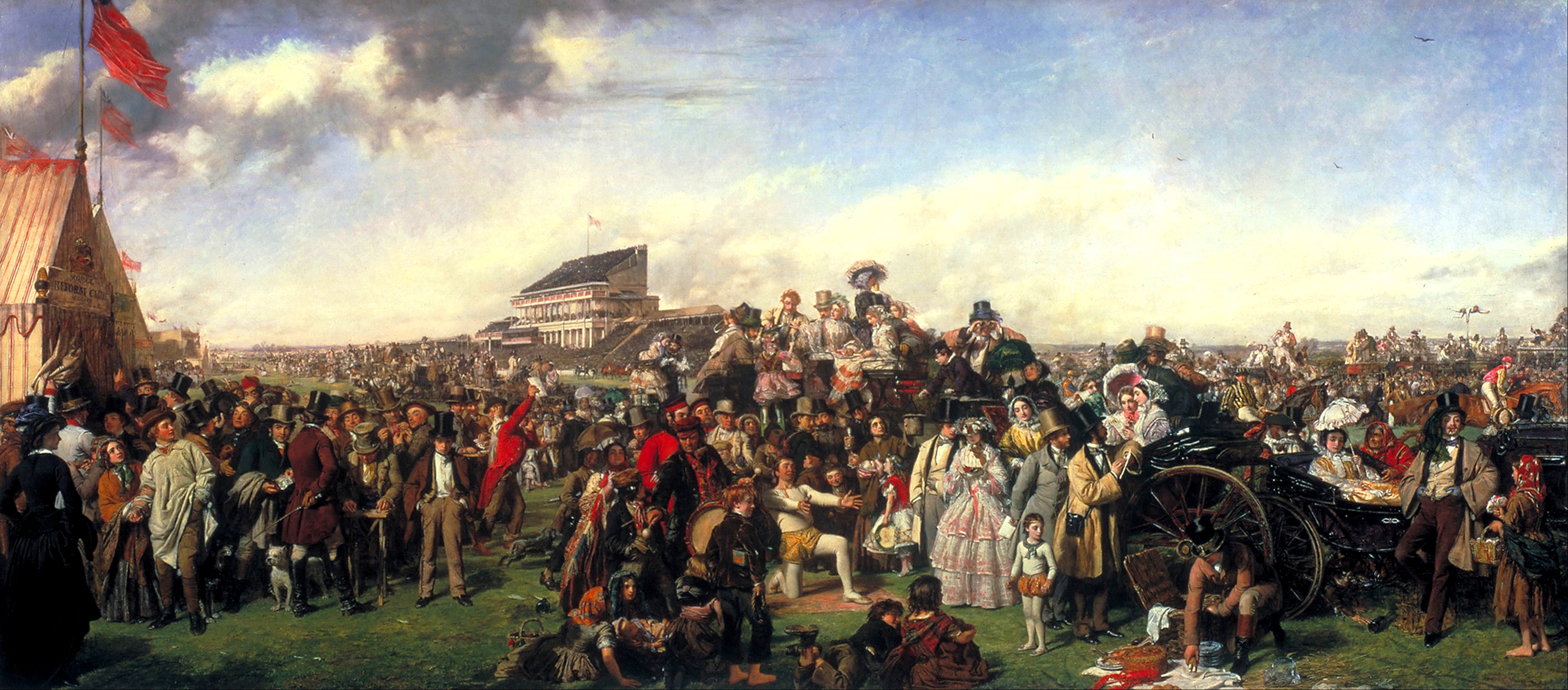
The Derby Day by William Powell Frith

The Royal Academy Exhibition of 1858 was the ninetieth annual Summer Exhibition of the British Royal Academy of Arts. It was held at the National Gallery in London from 3 May to 24 July 1858 during the Victorian era.

George Frederic Watts submitted three portrait paintings under the pseudonym F.W. George, his first appearance at the Academy in several years after boycotting it. Several of the key participants of the Pre-Raphaelite movement were absent, but the critic John Ruskin suggested that their style had influenced many of the paintings on display. Francis Grant displayed The Countess of Errol at The Camp of the Rifle Brigade, Bulgaria.

Edward Matthew Ward displayed Queen Victoria at the Tomb of Napoleon, a royal commission, depicting the state visit Queen Victoria had made to France in 1855. By far the greatest attraction at the exhibition was William Powell Frith's The Derby Day, a panoramic genre painting featuring the Epson Derby. Its enormous popularity with crowds meant a rail to be erected to protect it. Frith's friend Augustus Egg displayed his Past and Present series, a trilogy of paintings showing the disastrous effect of a family of the wife's adultery.

== Gallery ==
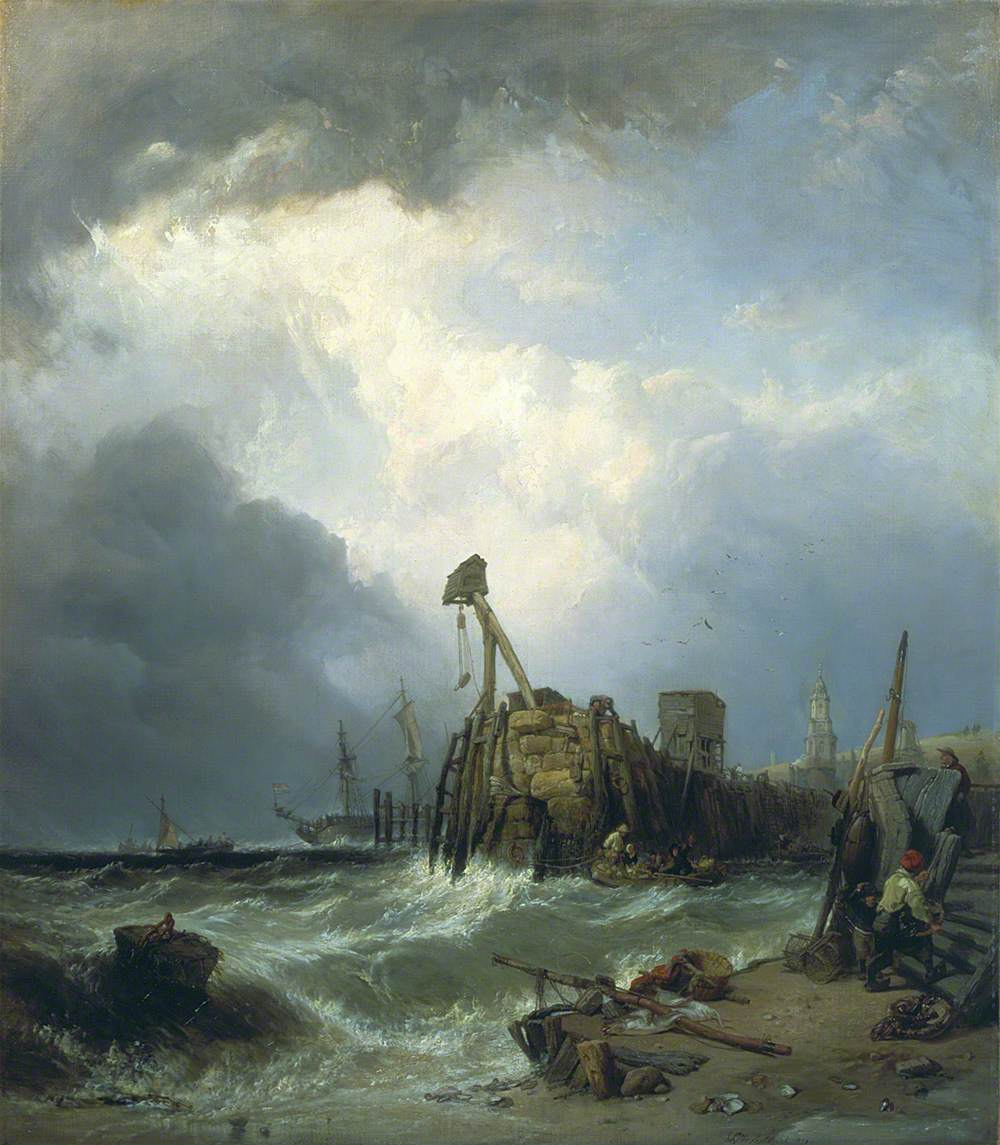
Old Holland by Clarkson Stanfield

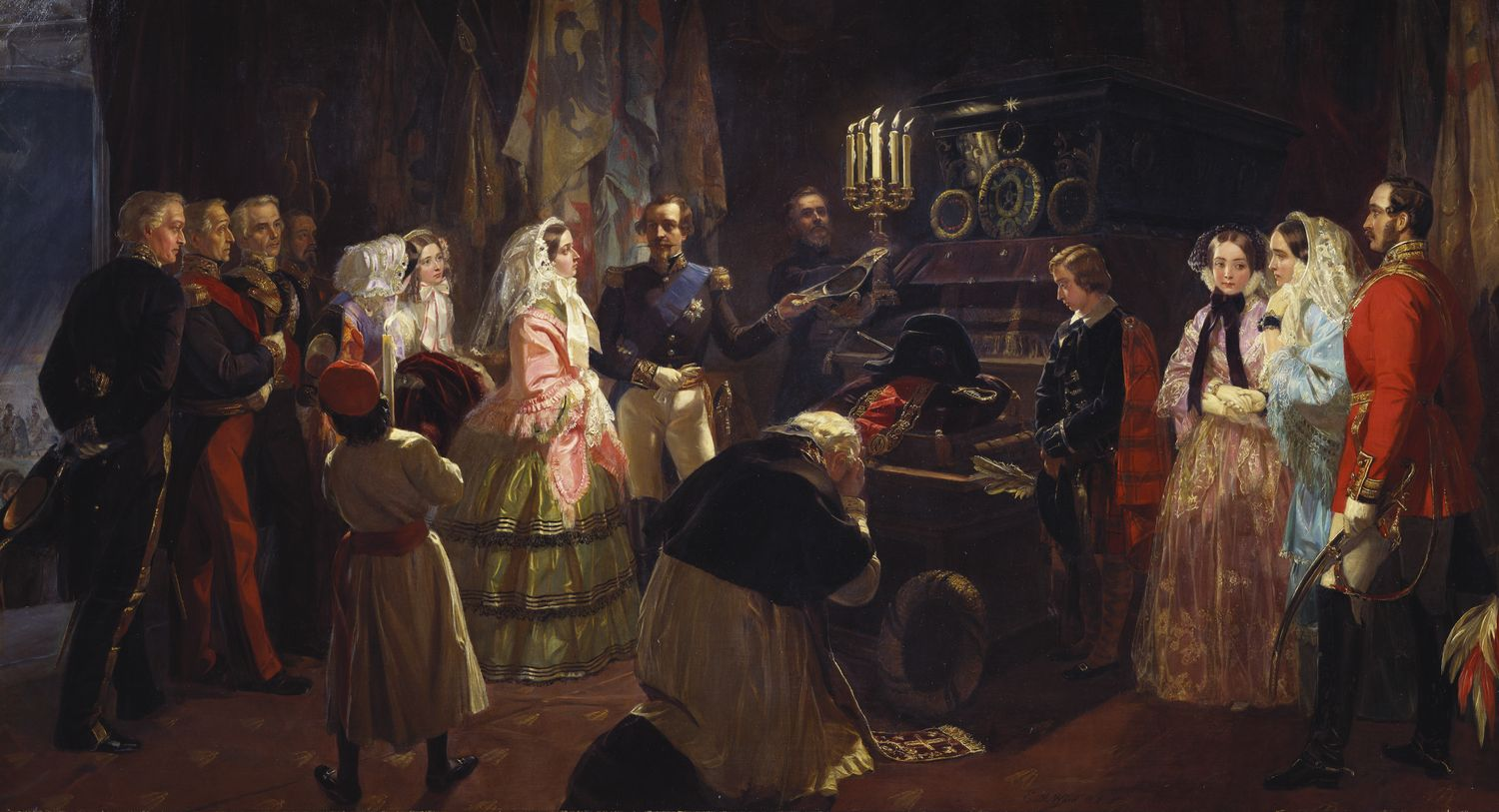
Queen Victoria at the Tomb of Napoleon by Edward Matthew Ward

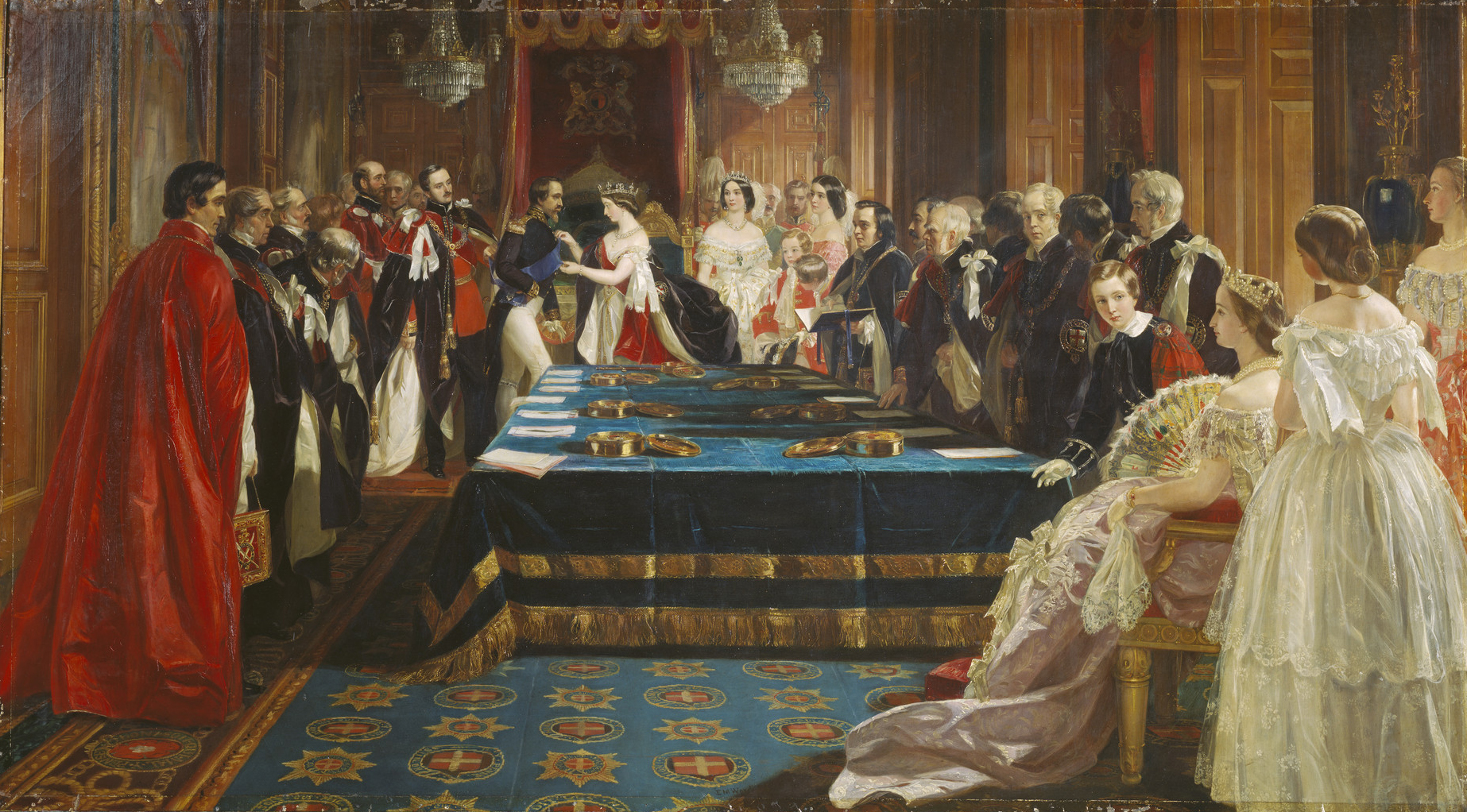
The Investiture of Napoleon III with the Order of the Garter by Edward Matthew Ward

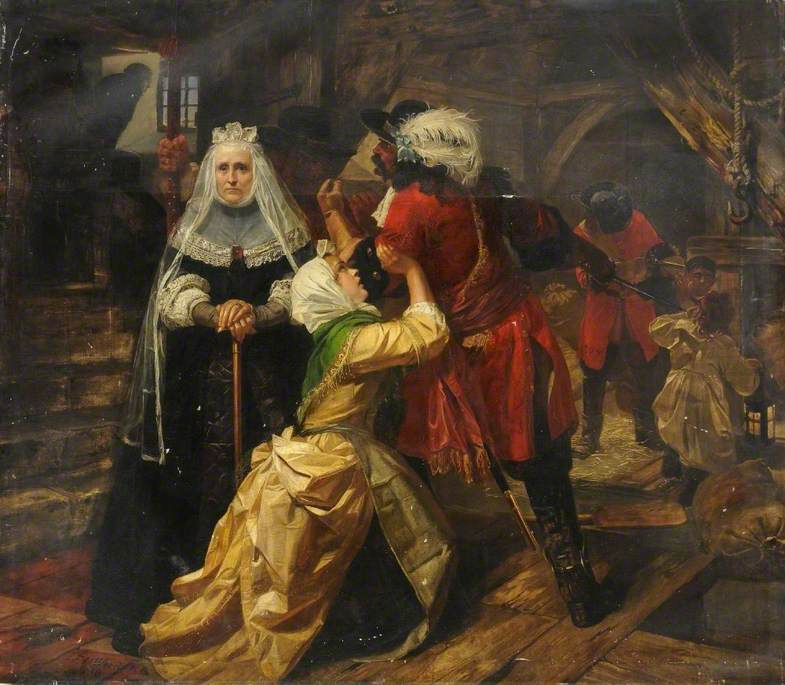
The Concealment of the Fugitive by Alice Lisle by Edward Matthew Ward

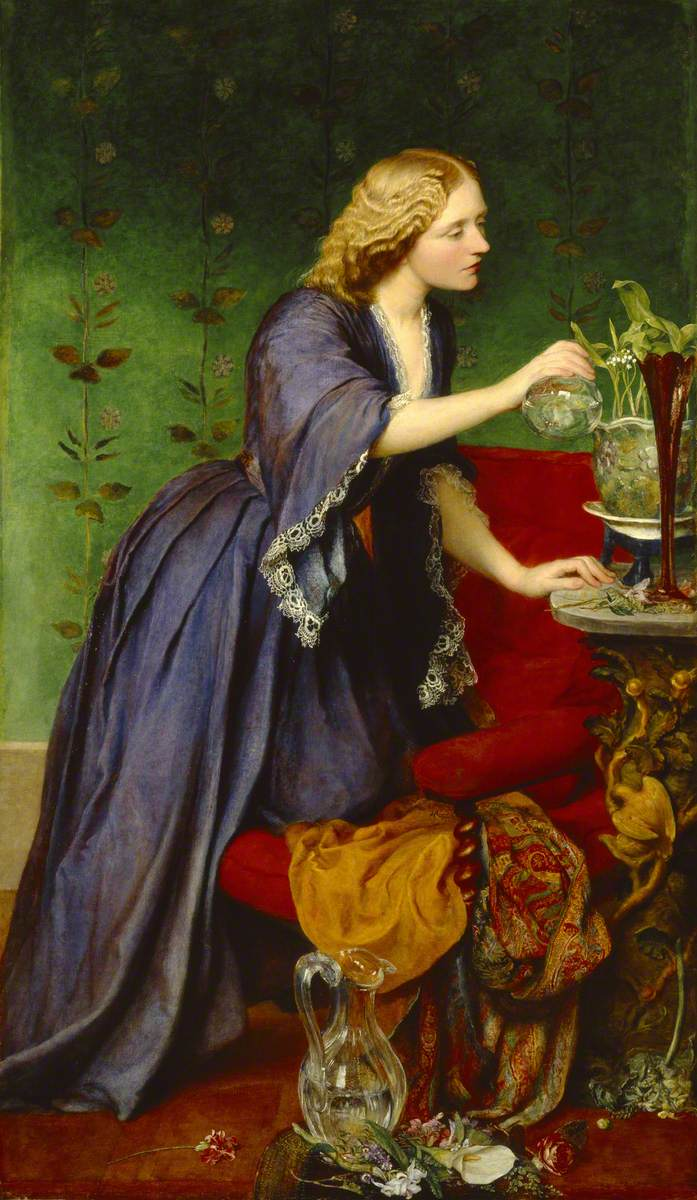
Mrs Nassau John Senior by George Frederic Watts

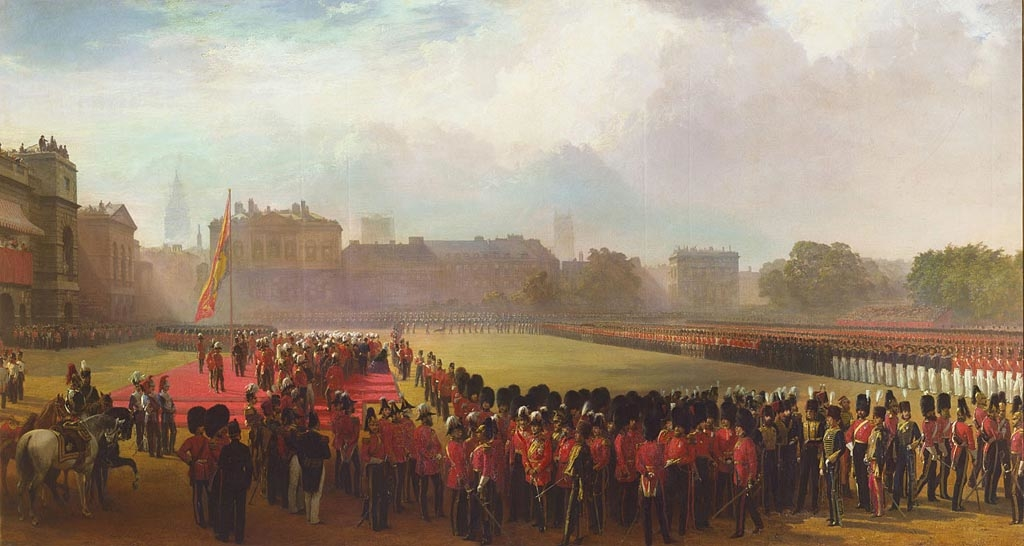
The Presentation of Crimean Medals by Queen Victoria by George Housman Thomas

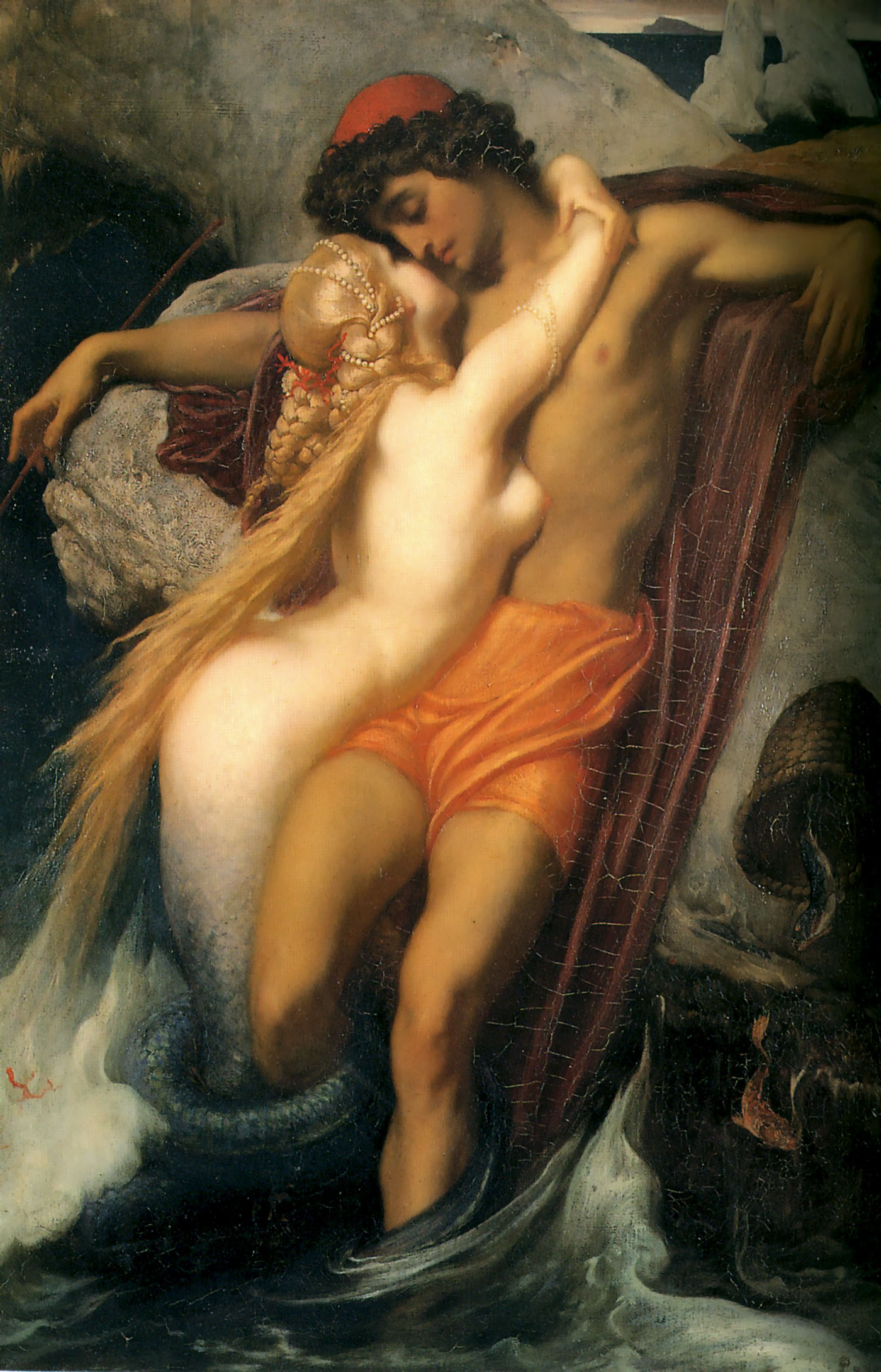
The Fisherman and the Syren by Frederic Leighton

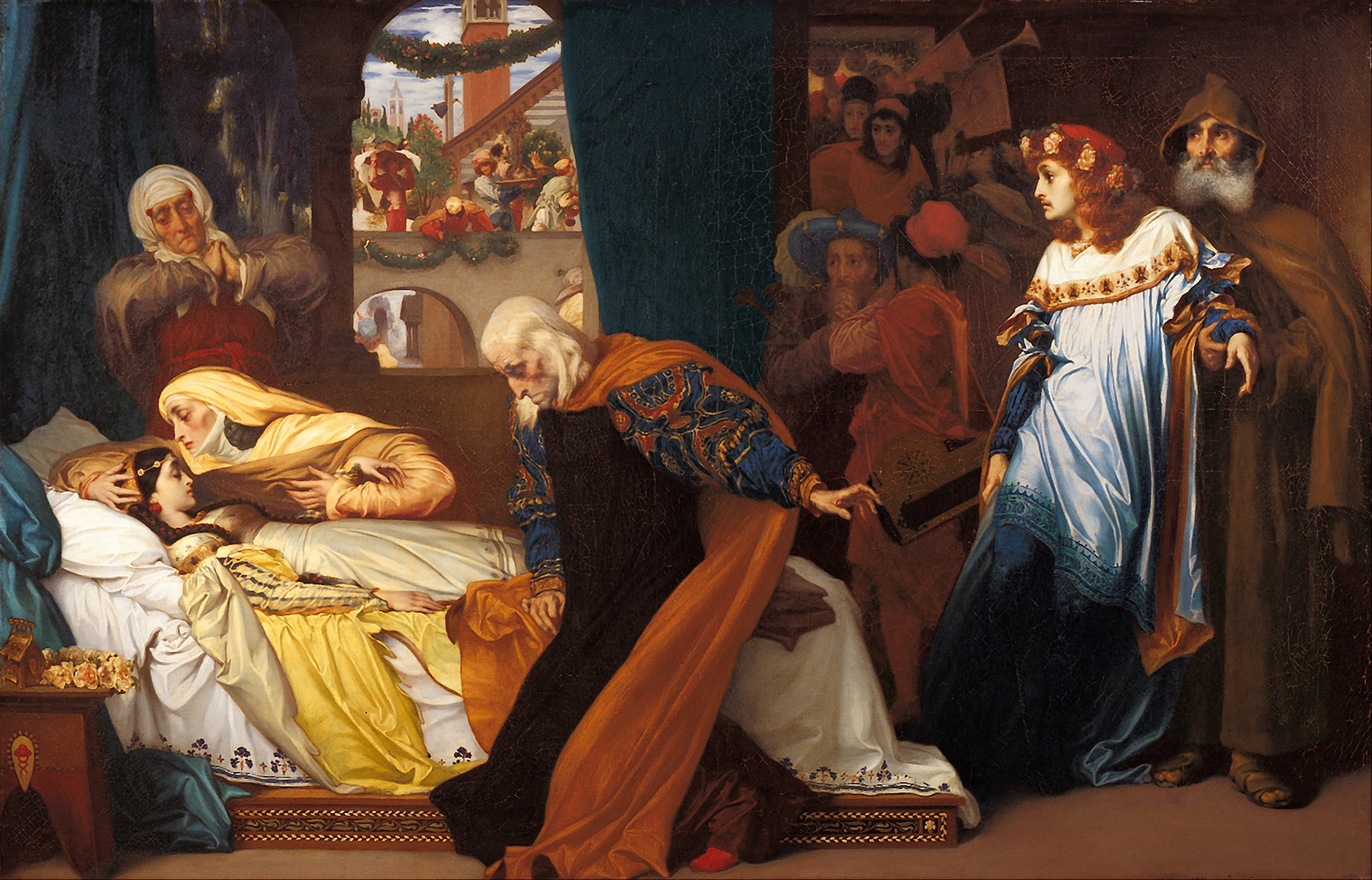
The Feigned Death of Juliet by Frederic Leighton

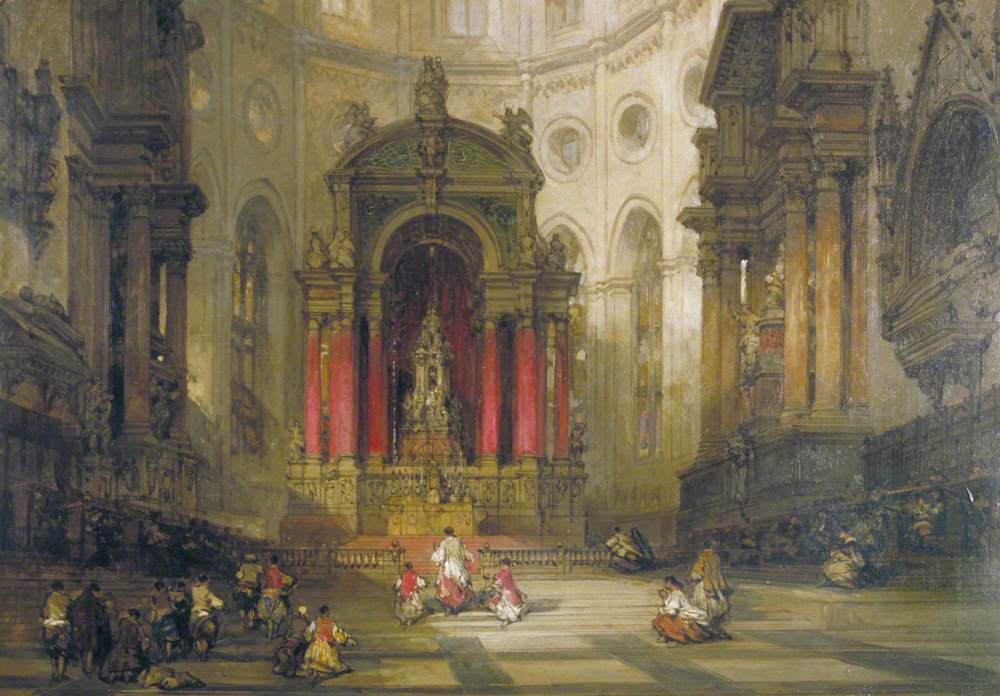
San Giovanni e San Paolo, Venice by David Roberts

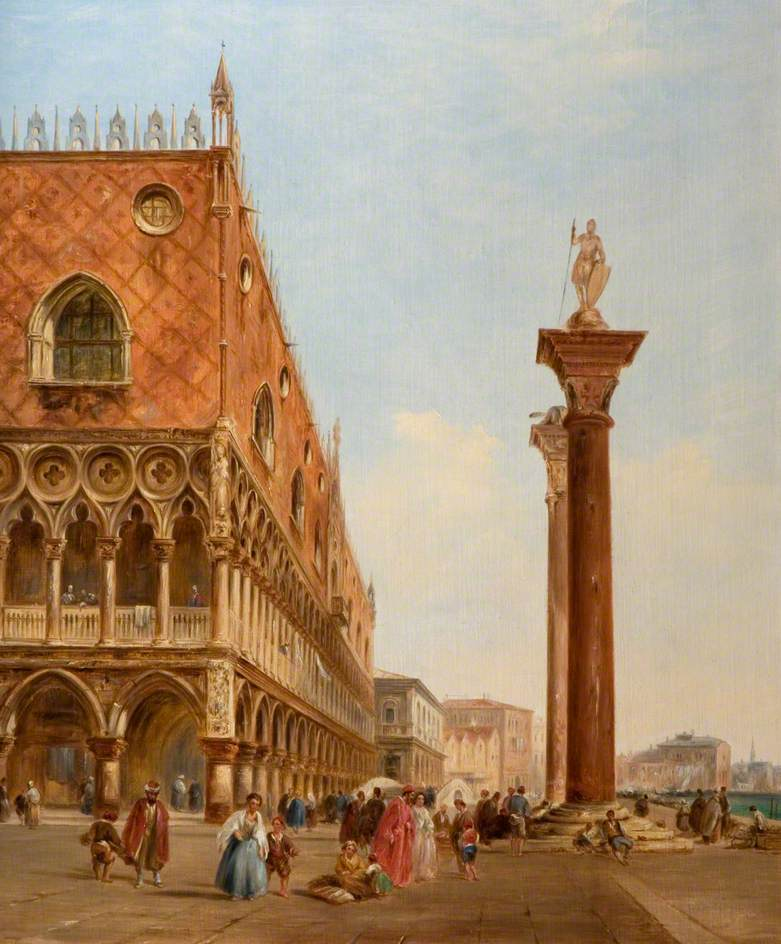
The Doge's Palace, Venice by David Roberts

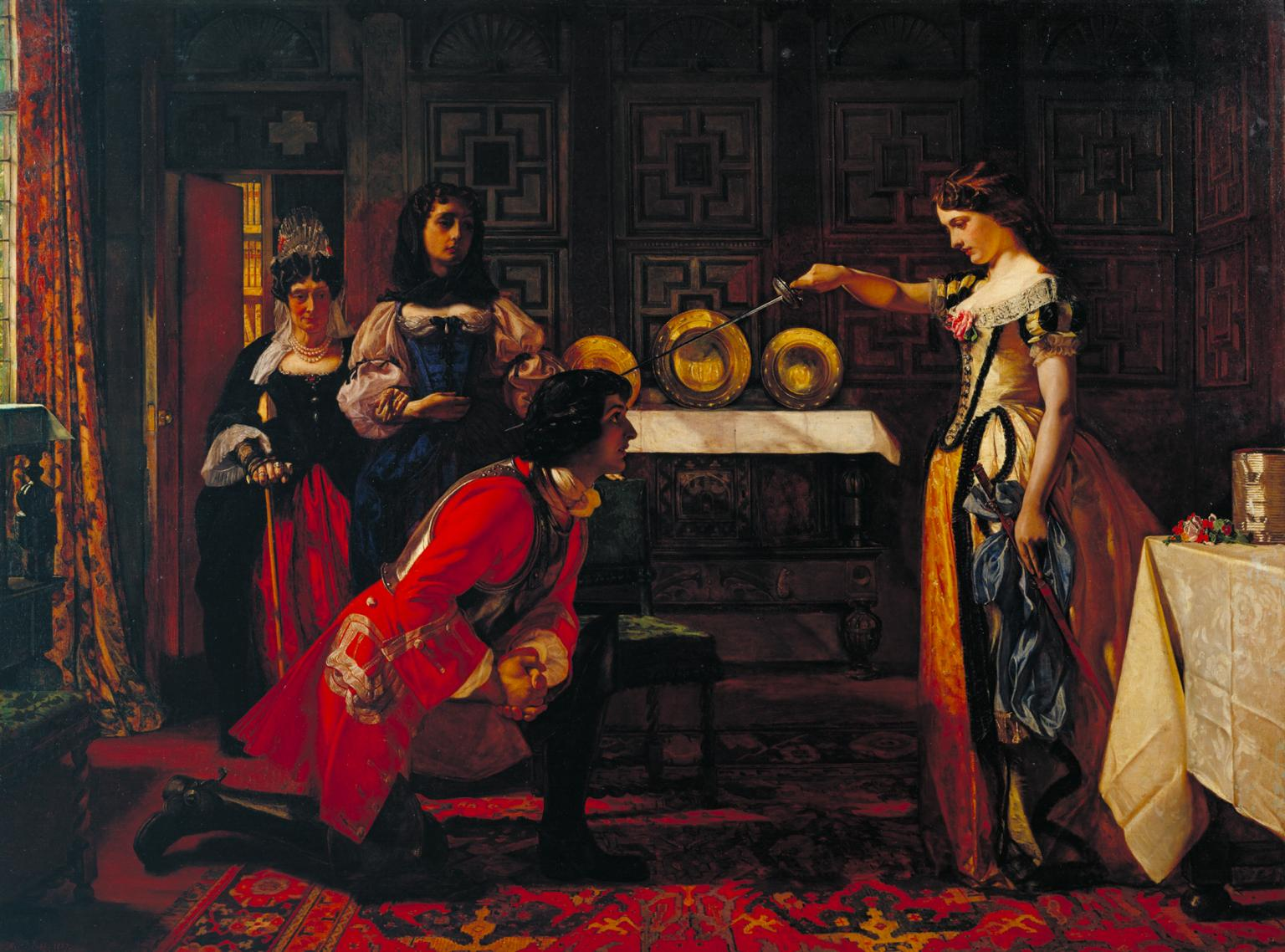
Beatrix Knighting Esmond by Augustus Leopold Egg

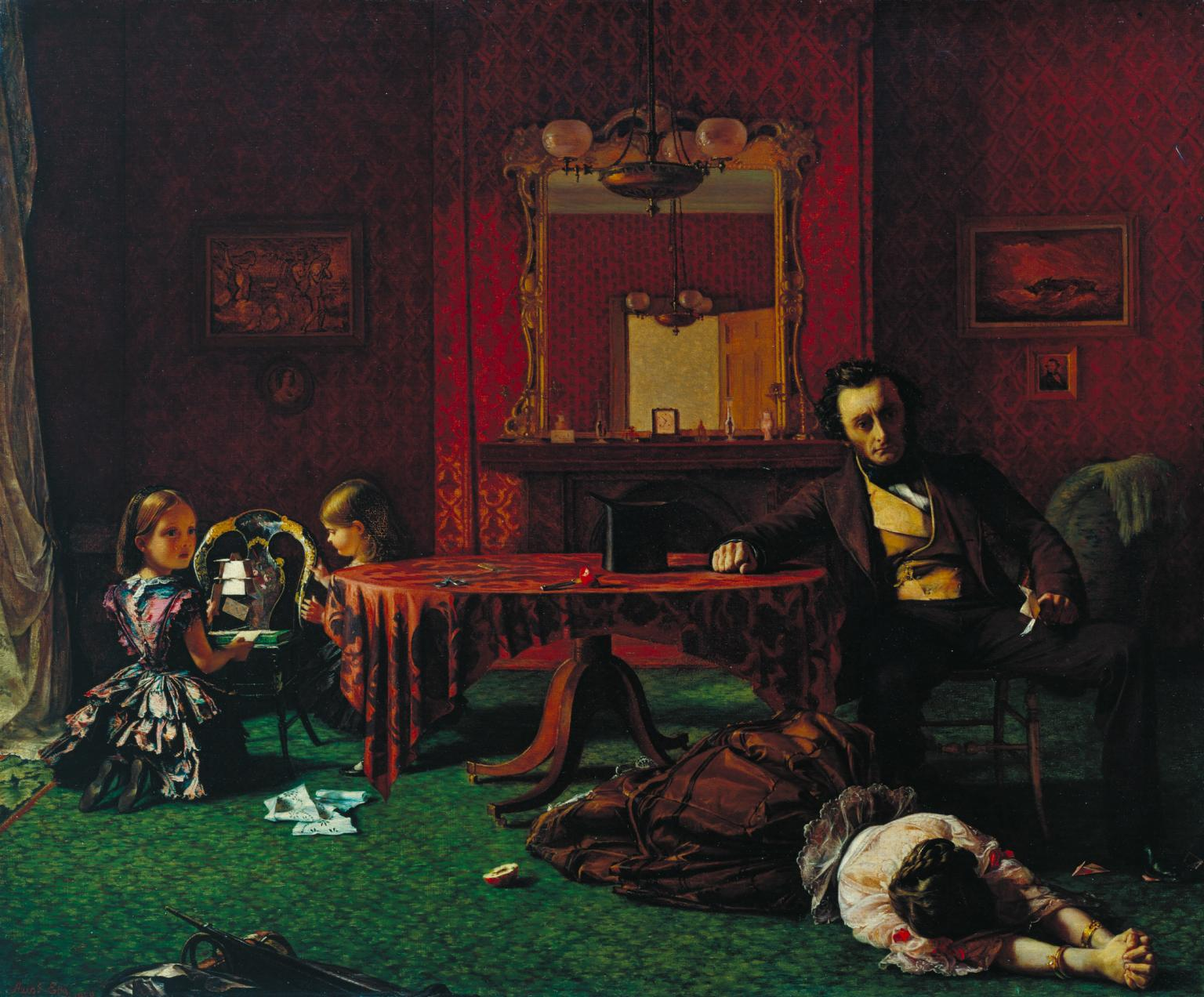
Past and Present Number One by Augustus Leopold Egg

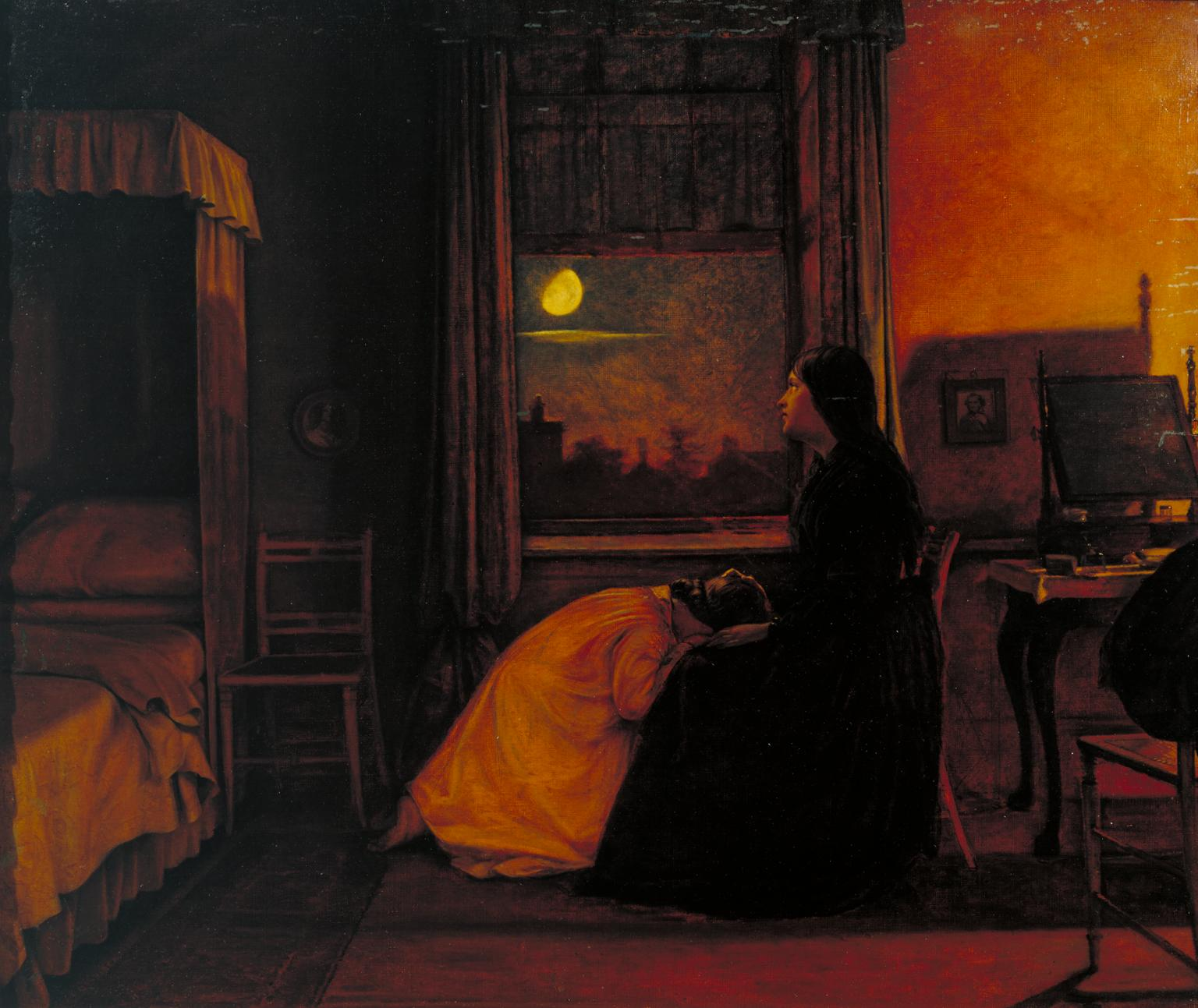
Past and Present Number Two by Augustus Leopold Egg

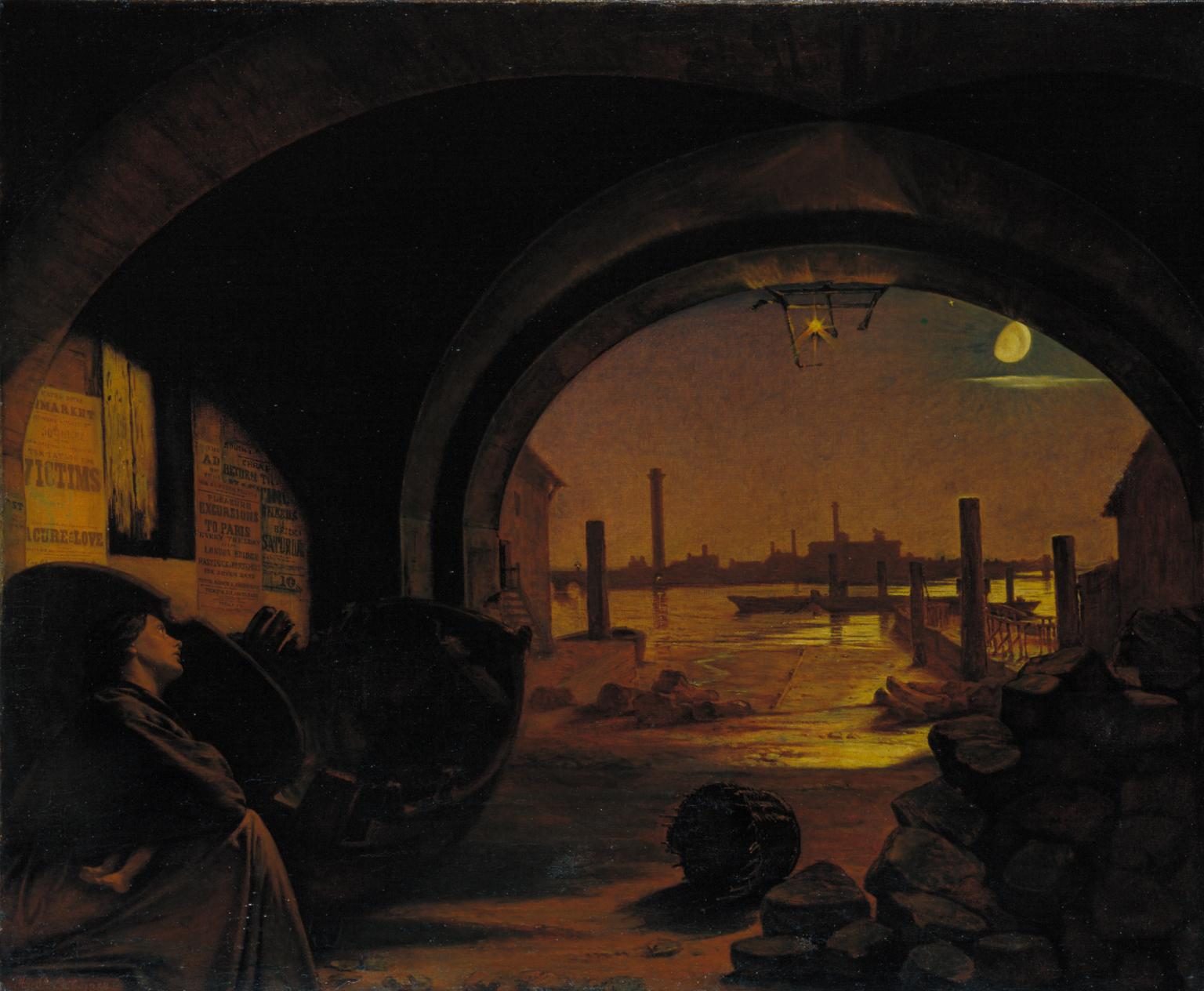
Past and Present Number Three by Augustus Leopold Egg

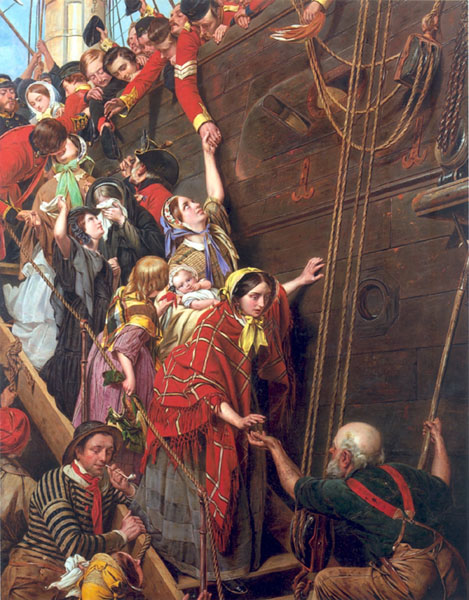
Eastward Ho! by Henry Nelson O'Neil

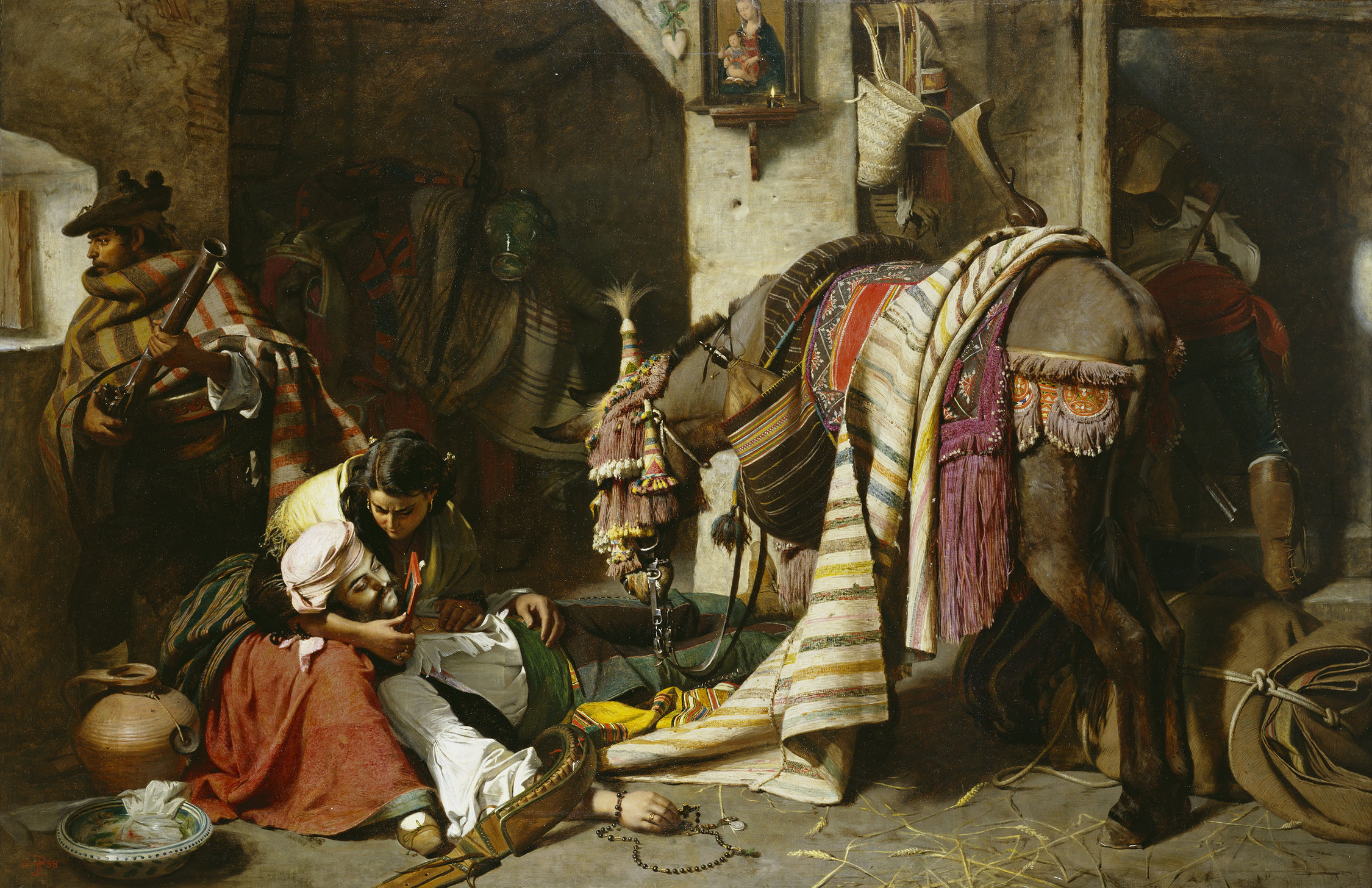
The Dying Contrabandista by John Phillip

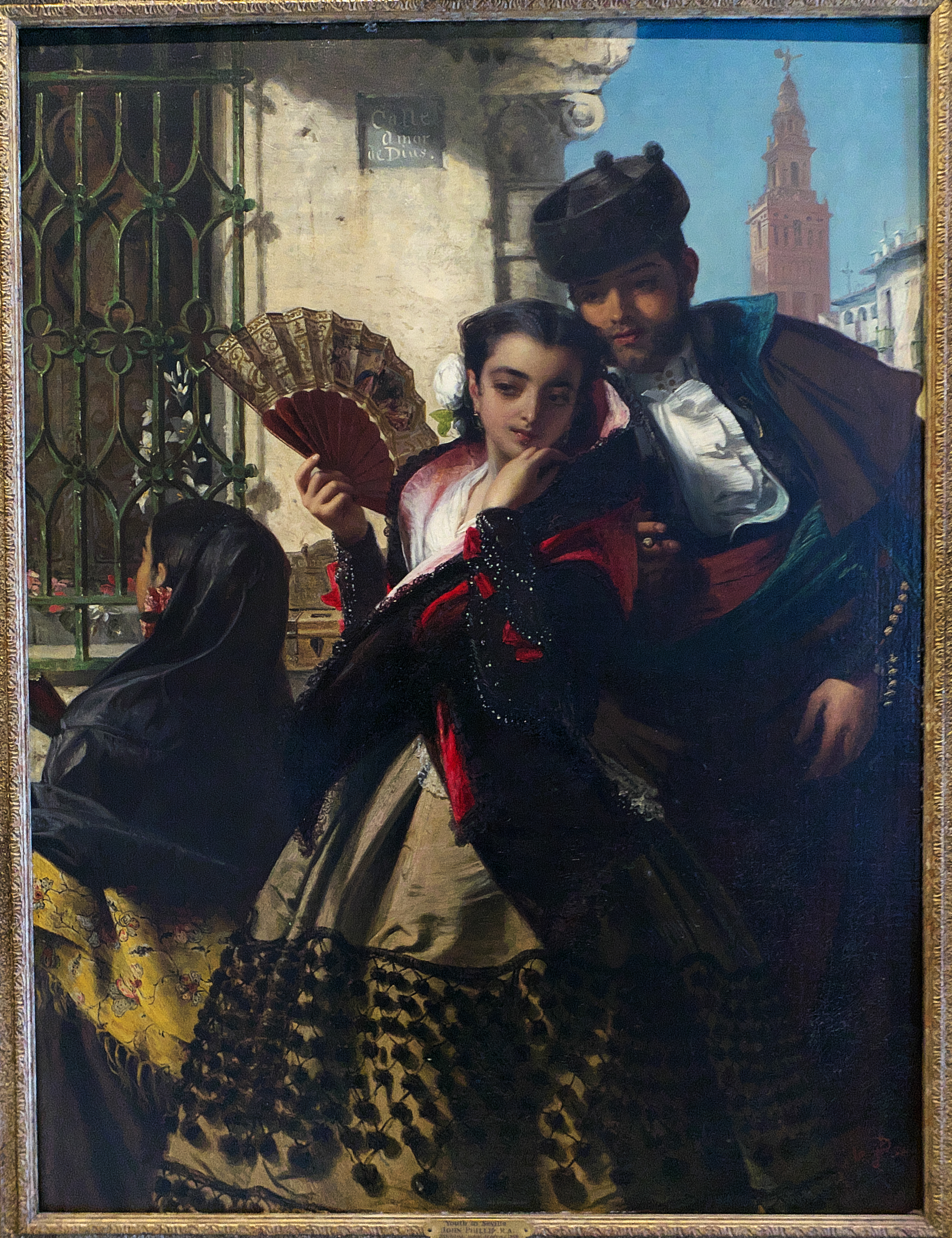
Youth in Seville by John Phillip

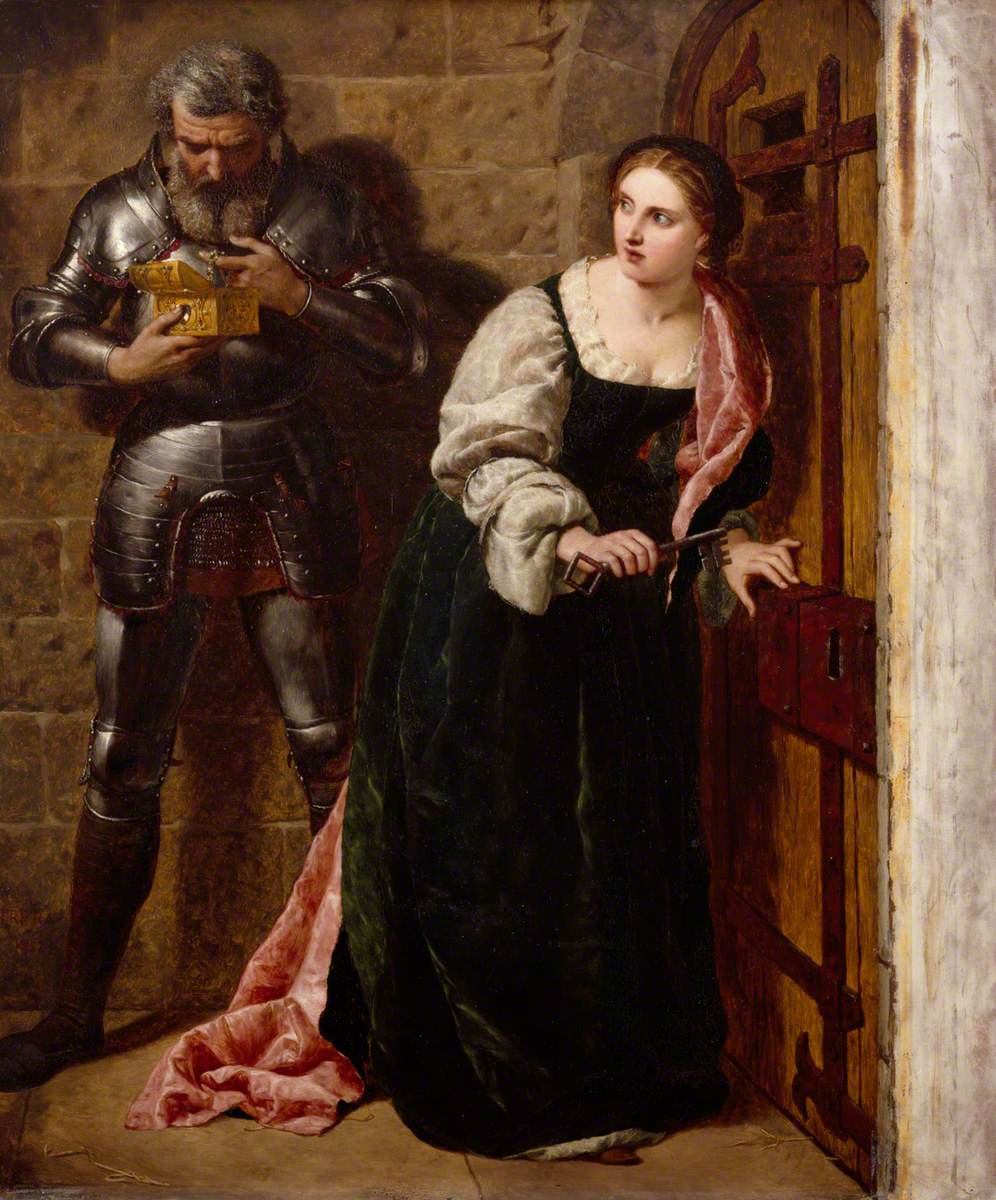
The Bribe by Frederick Richard Pickersgill

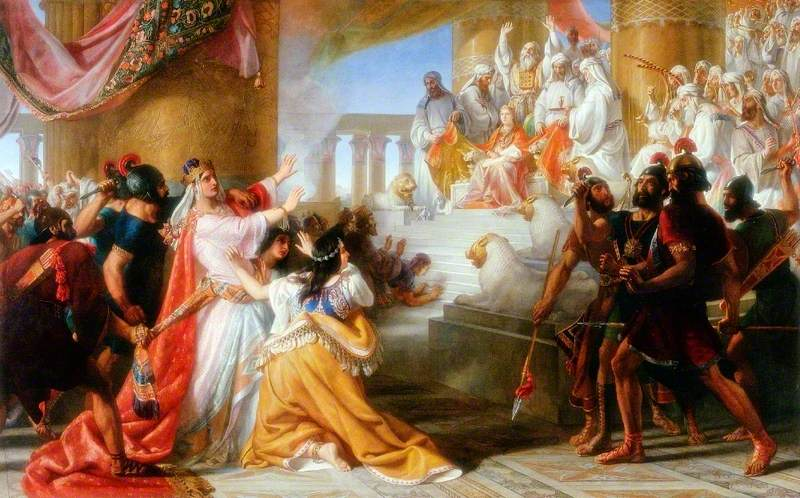
Athaliah's Dismay at the Coronation of Joash by Solomon Hart

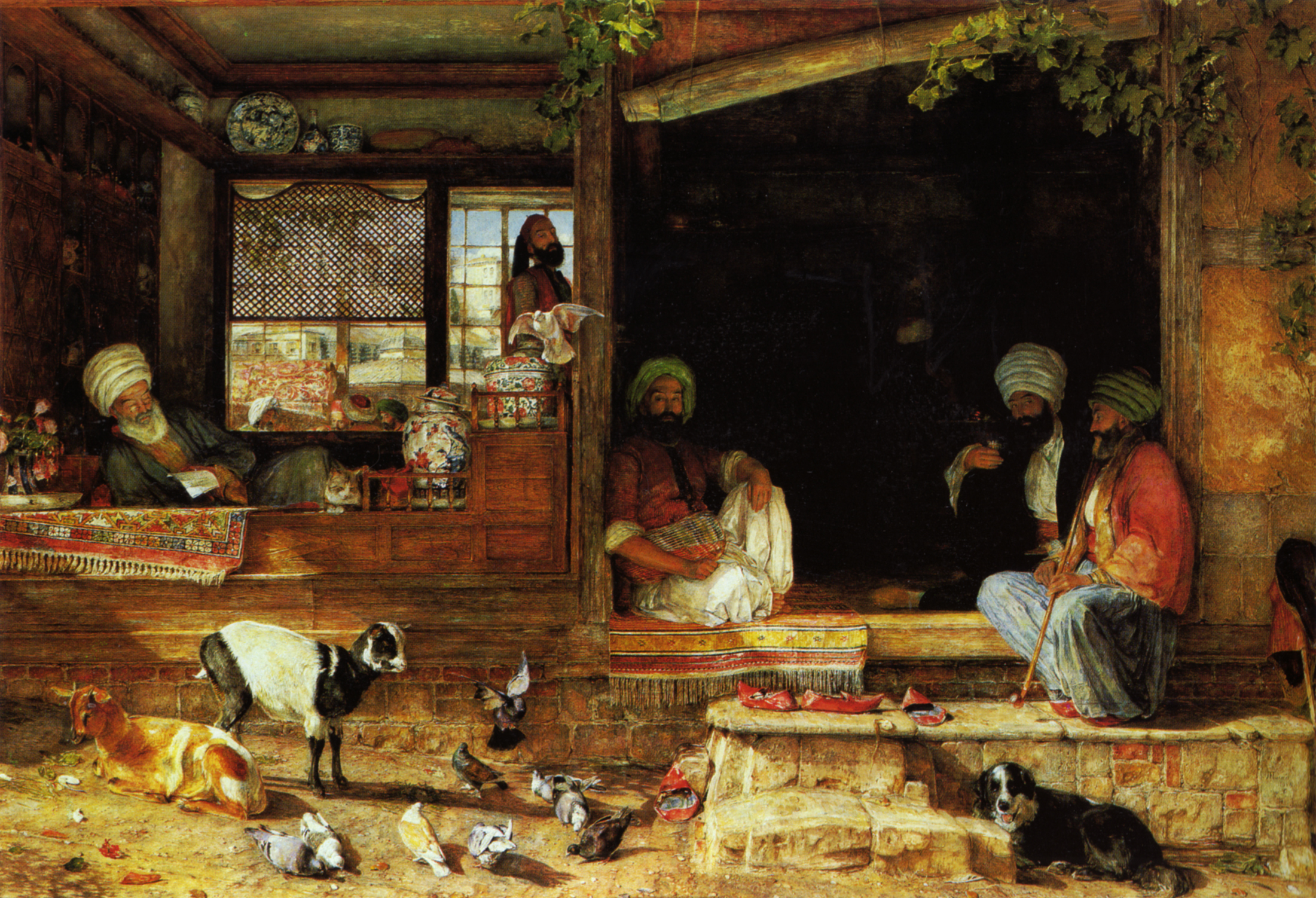
The Kibab Shop by John Frederick Lewis

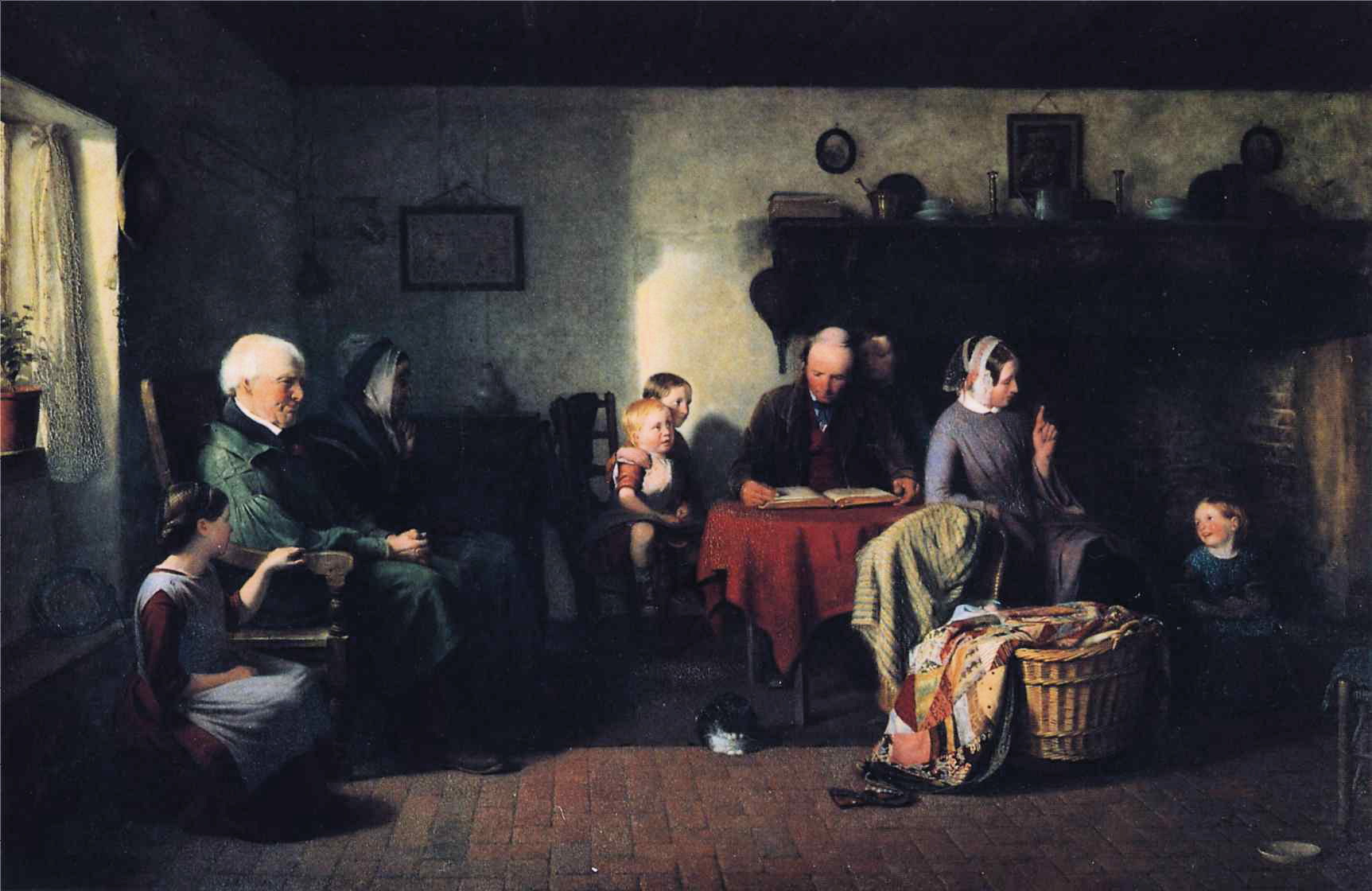
Sunday Evening by Thomas Webster

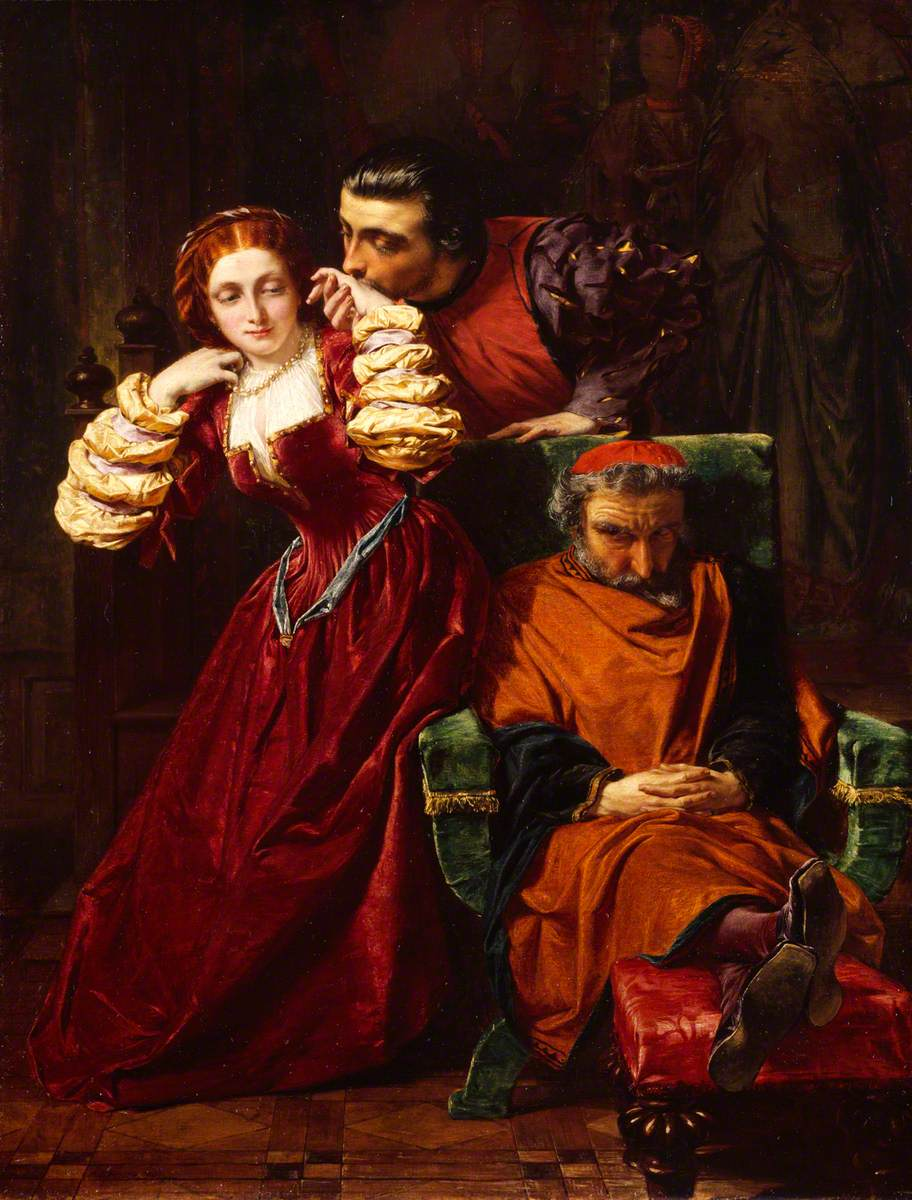
Two Gentlemen of Verona by Alfred Elmore

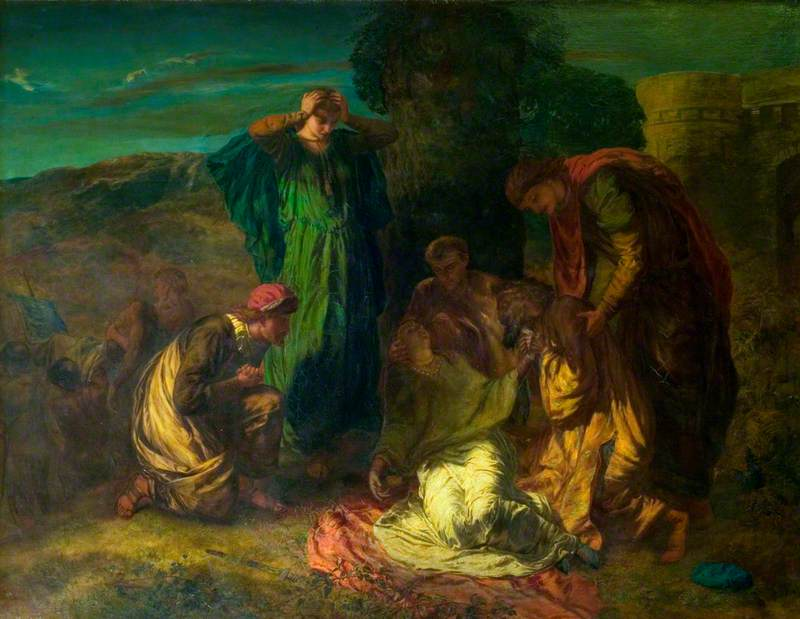
The Death of Cordelia by Paul Falconer Poole

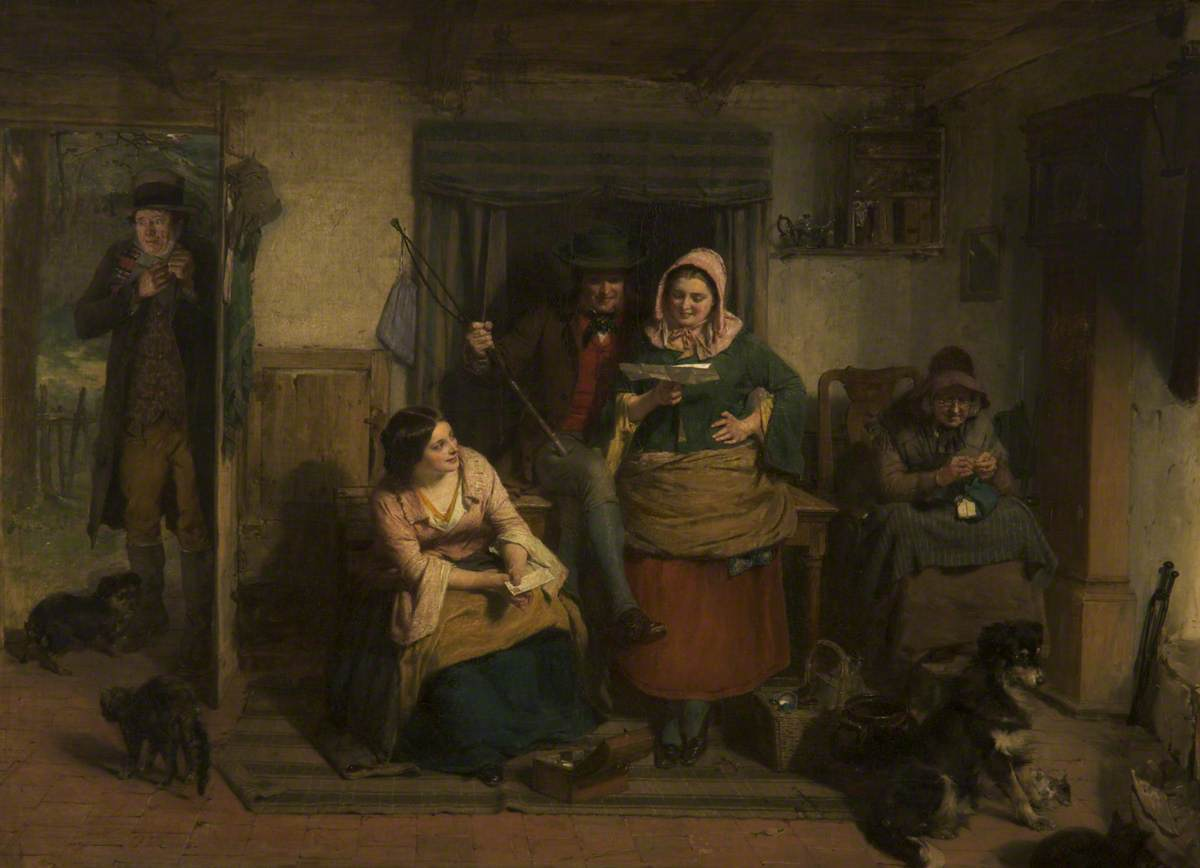
The Listener Ne'er Hears Gude o' Himsel by Thomas Faed

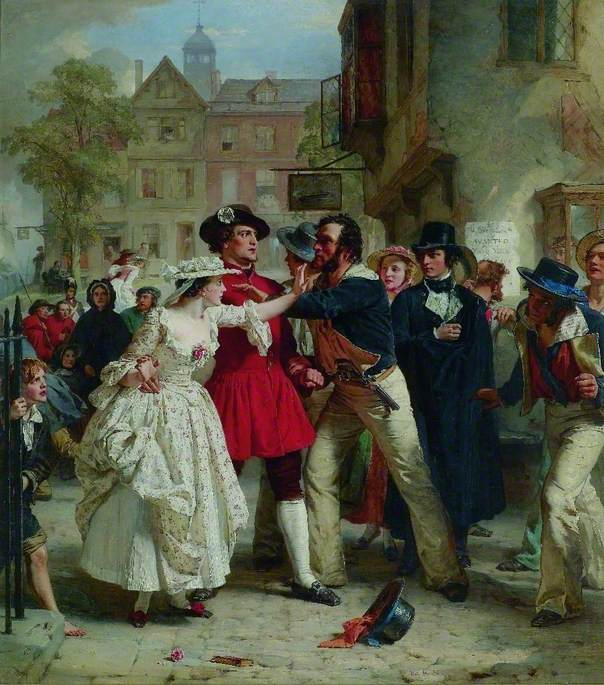
The Press Gang by Alexander Johnston

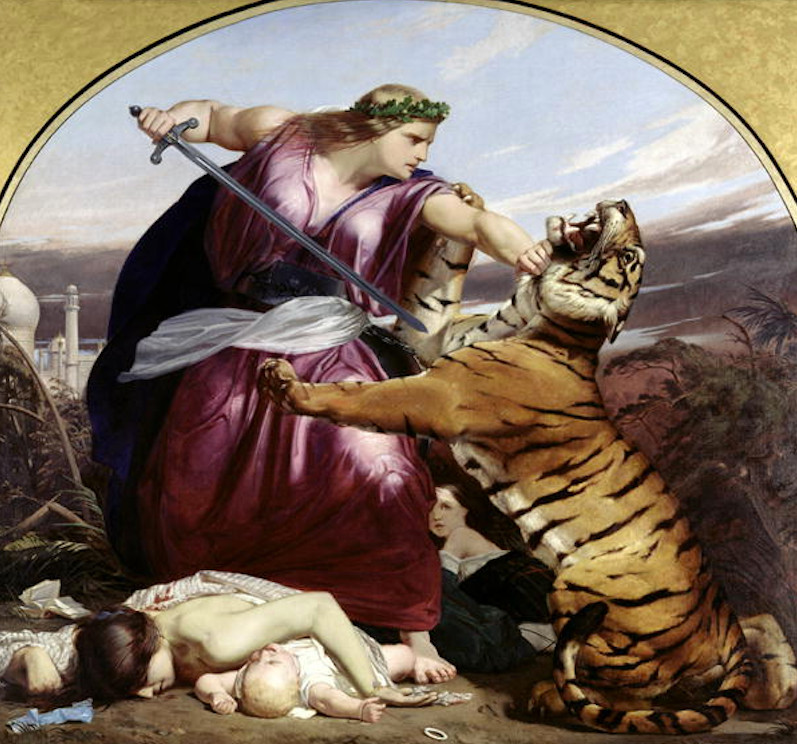
Retribution by Edward Armitage

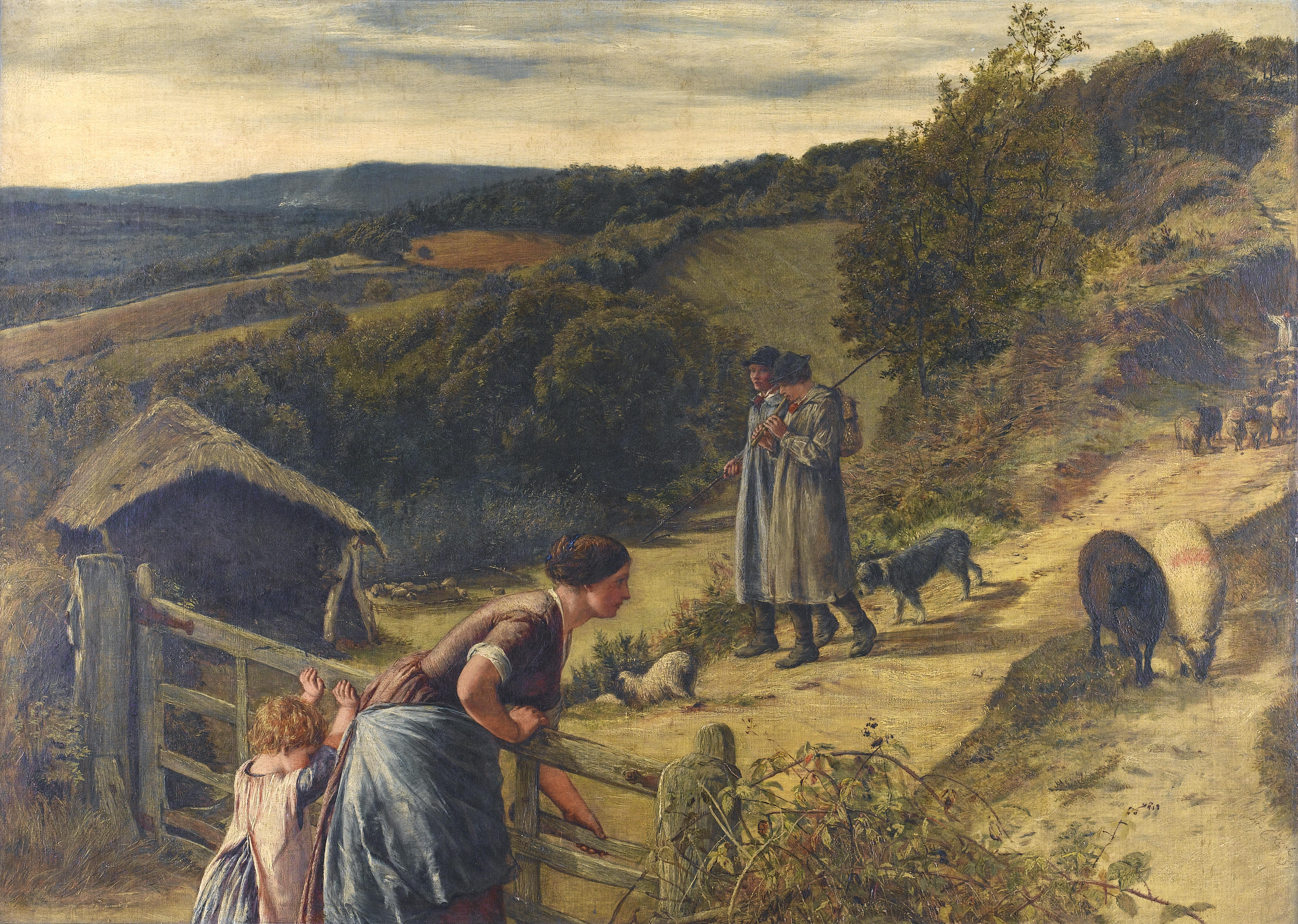
A Pastoral by James Clarke Hook

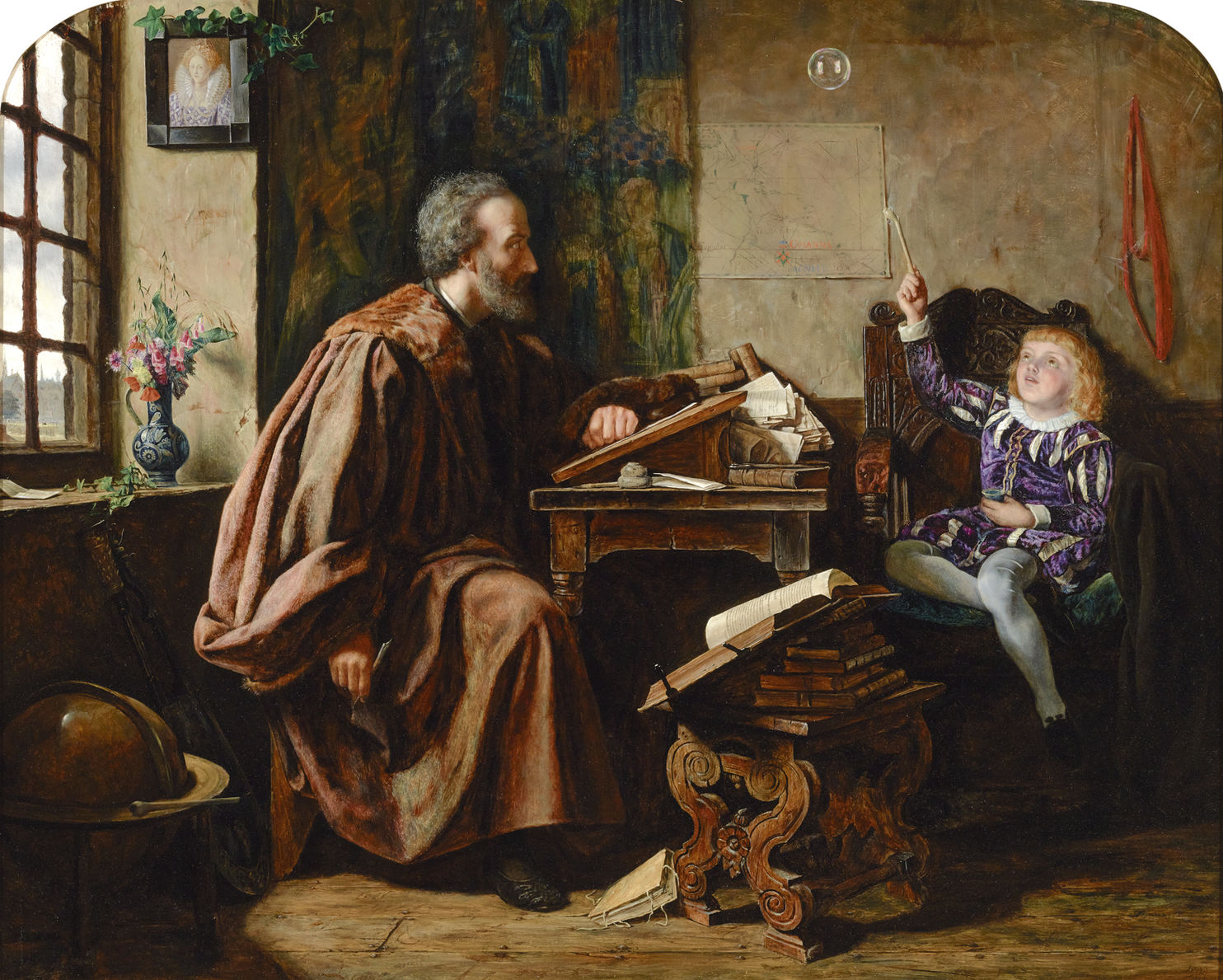
Sir Walter Raleigh in the Tower by Henry Wallis

The Fortress of Savona by Clarkson Stanfield

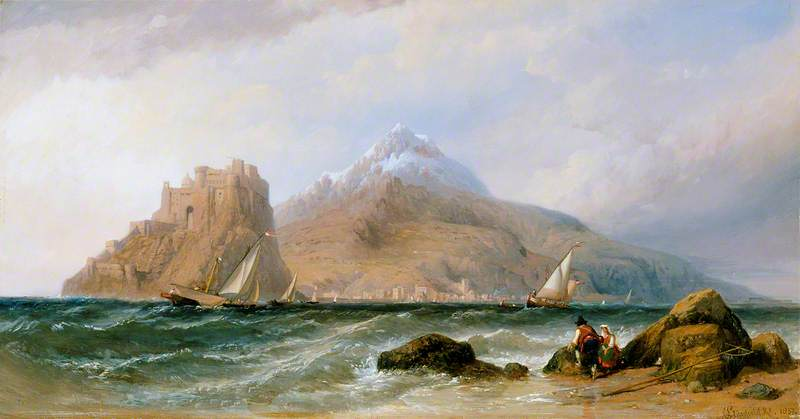
The Castle of Ischia by Clarkson Stanfield

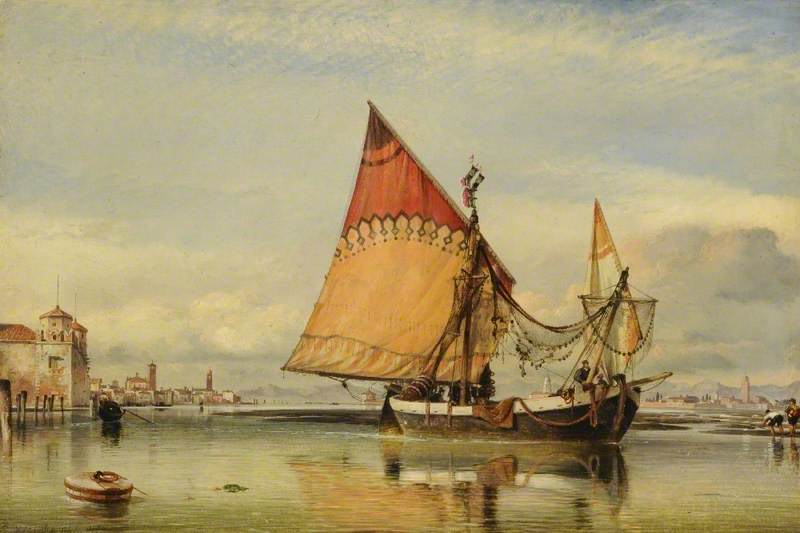
Venetian Fishing Craft off the Adriatic Shore of the Lido by Edward William Cooke

Bridge of Sighs, Venice by Edward William Cooke

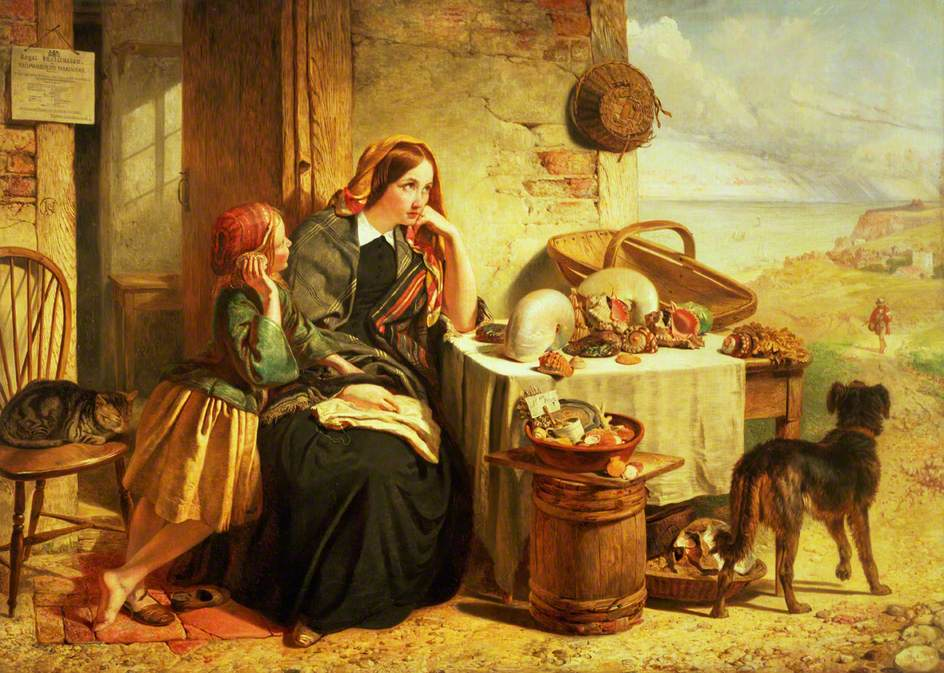
What Does the Sea Say? by Henry Courtney Selous

Flora MacDonald's Farewell to Charles Edward by Philip Hermogenes Calderon

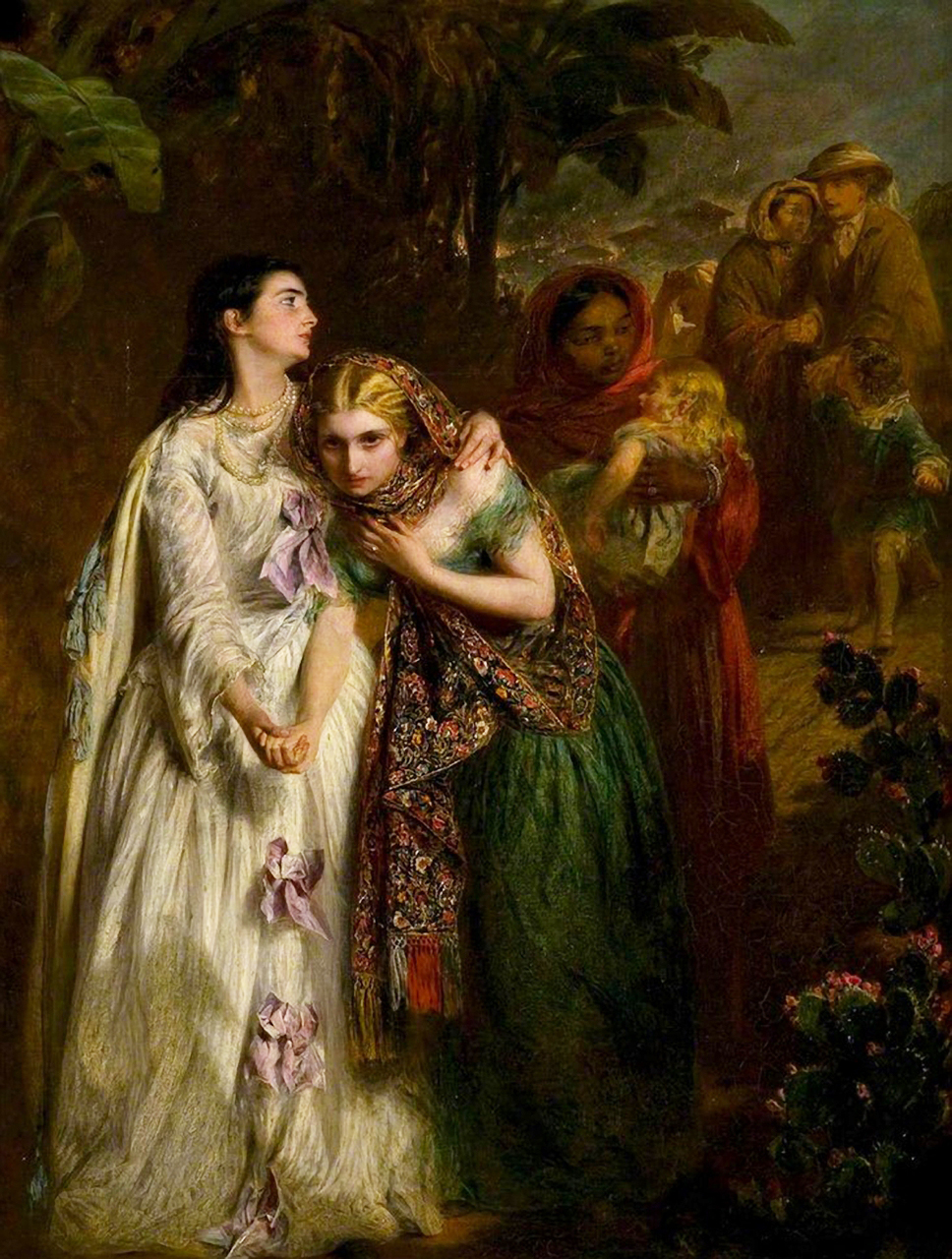
The Flight from Lucknow by Abraham Solomon

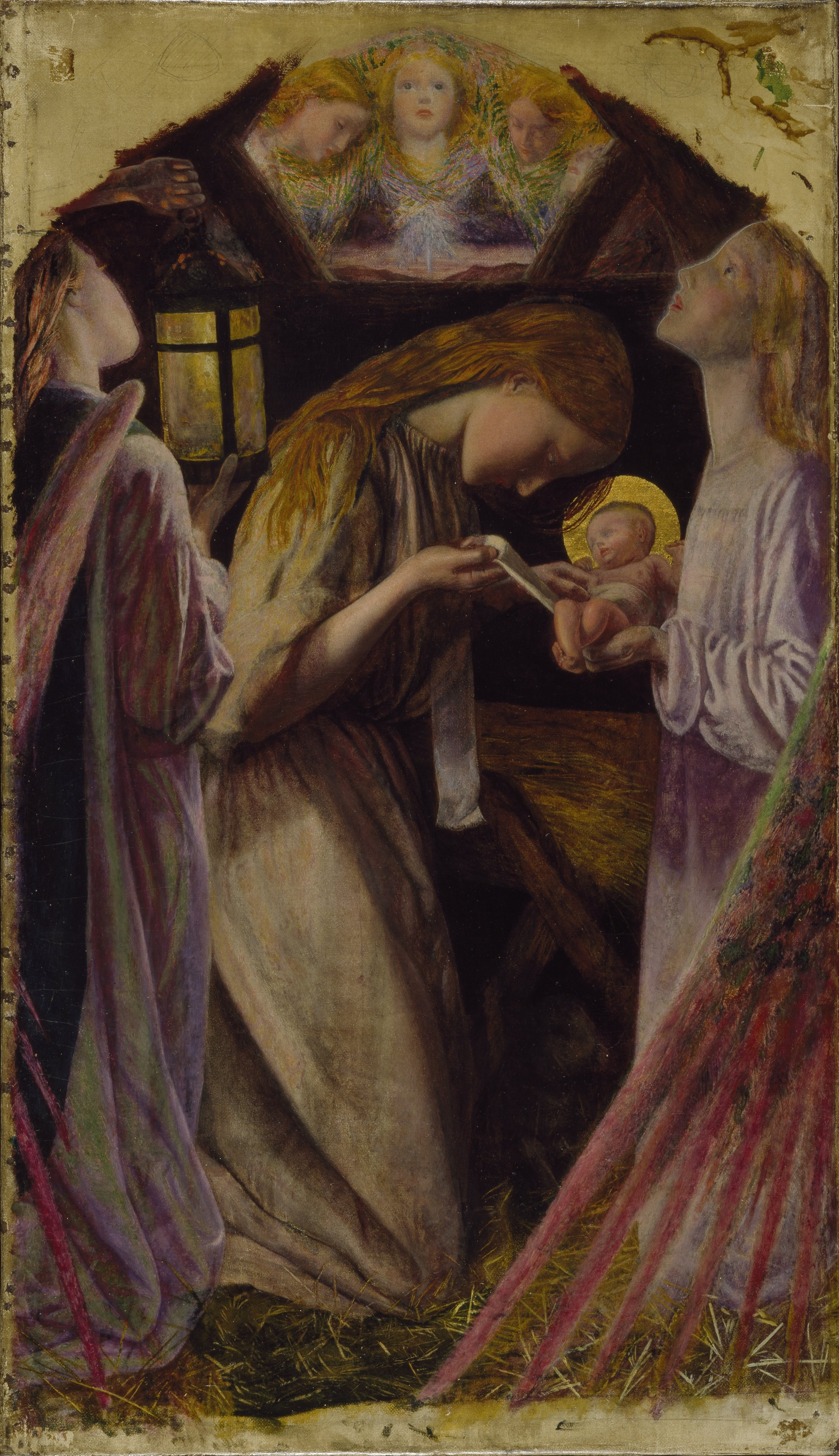
The Nativity by Arthur Hughes

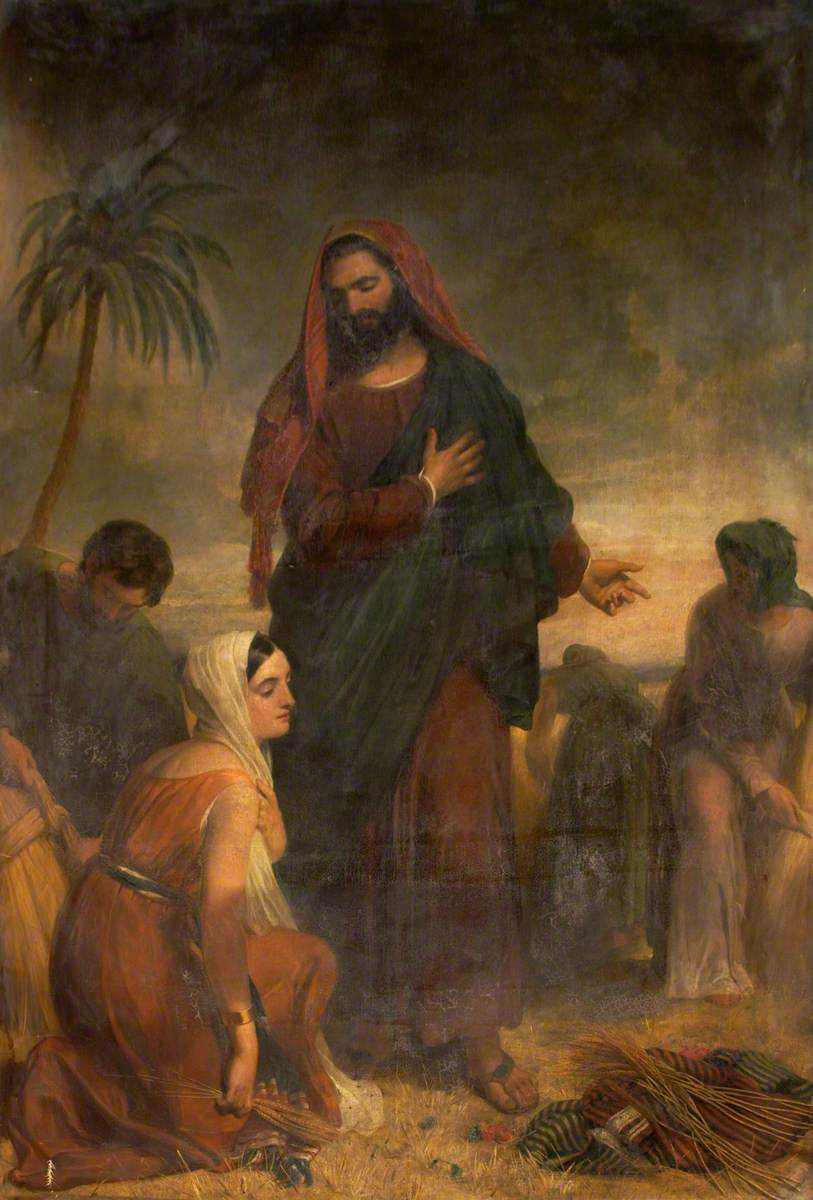
Ruth and Boaz by Henry William Pickersgill

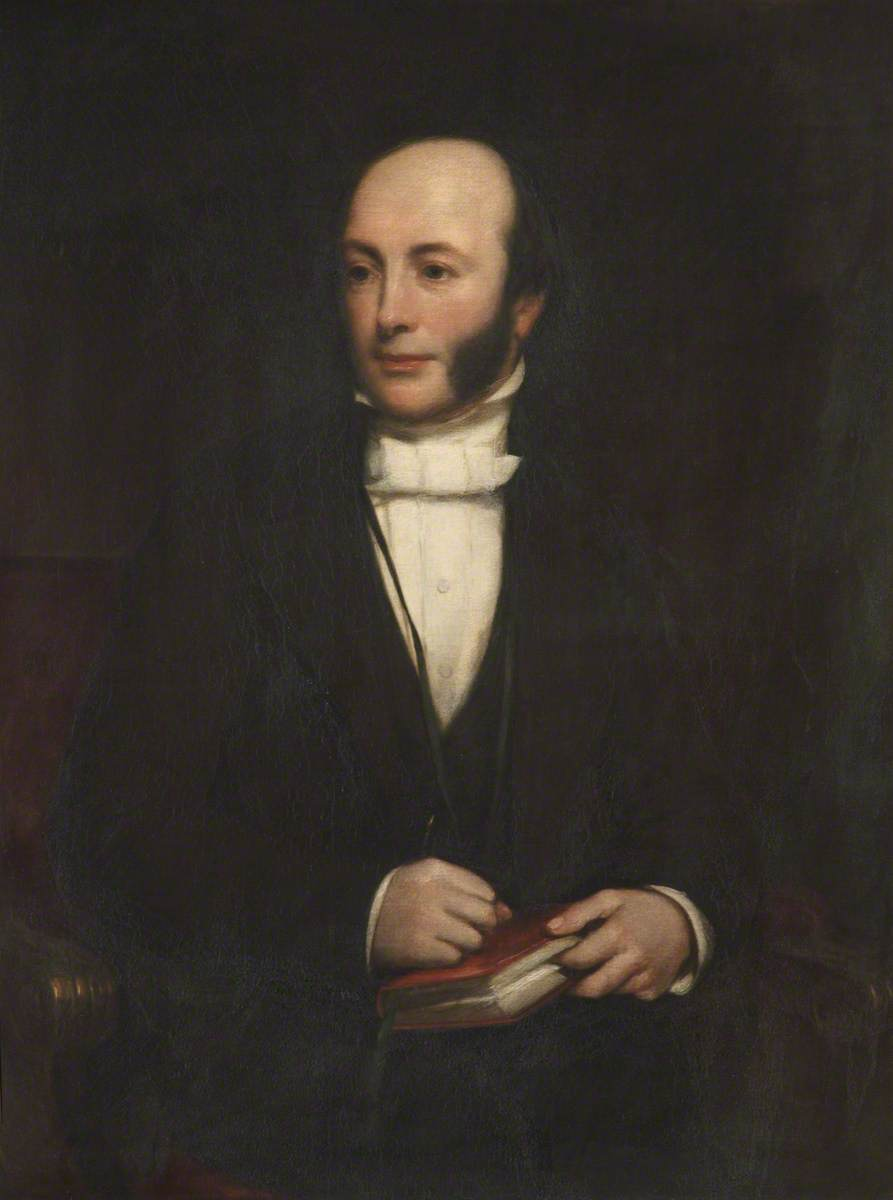
Portrait of John Barlow by Henry William Pickersgill

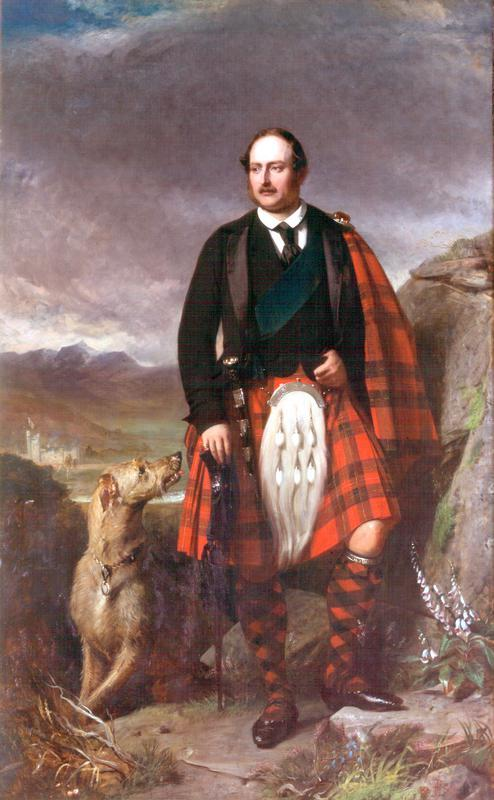
Portrait of Prince Albert by John Phillip

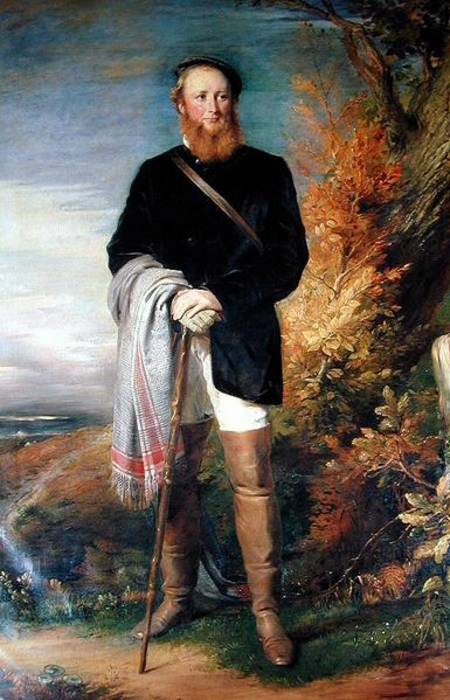
Portrait of the Earl of Leicester by George Richmond

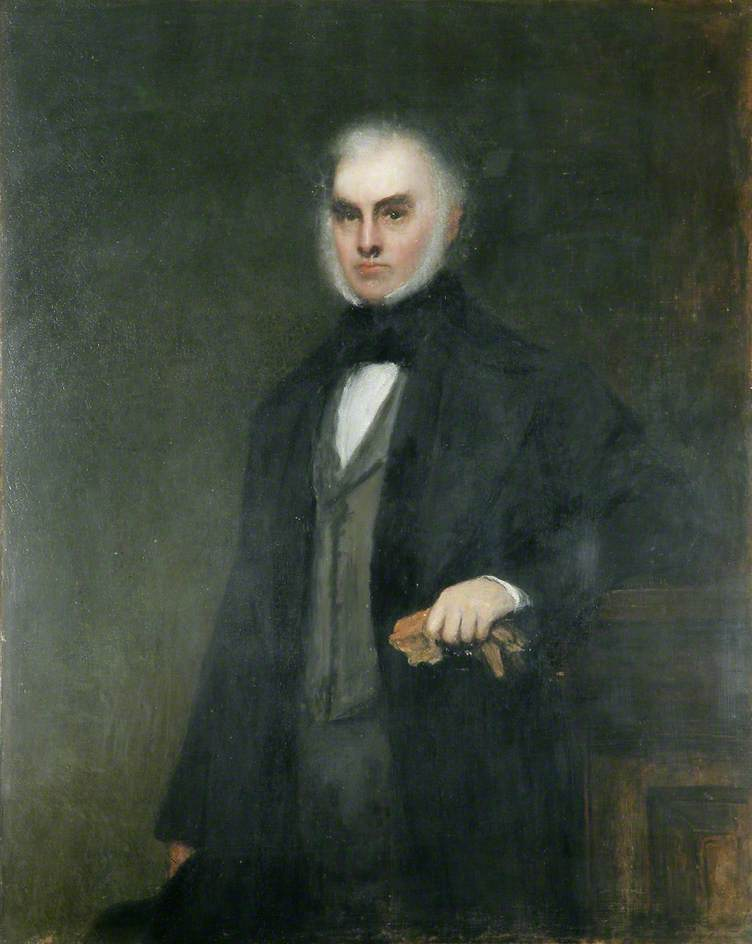
Portrait of Thomas Lombe Taylor by William Boxall

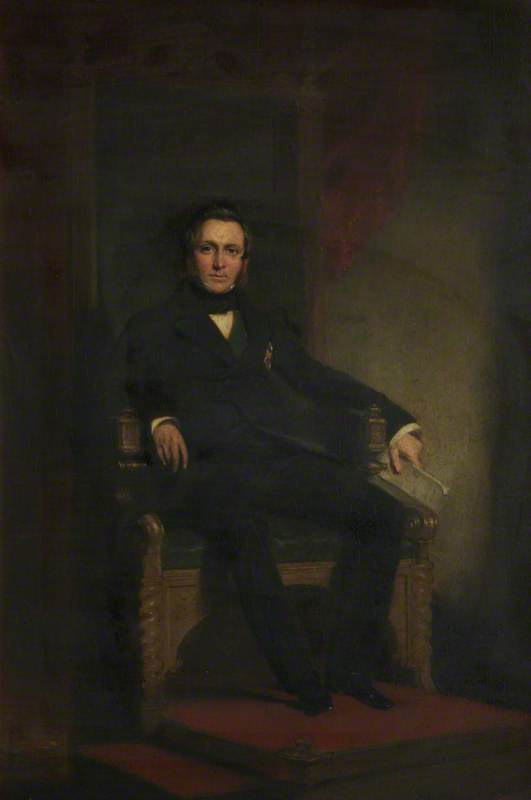
Portrait of Marquess of Dalhousie by John Watson Gordon

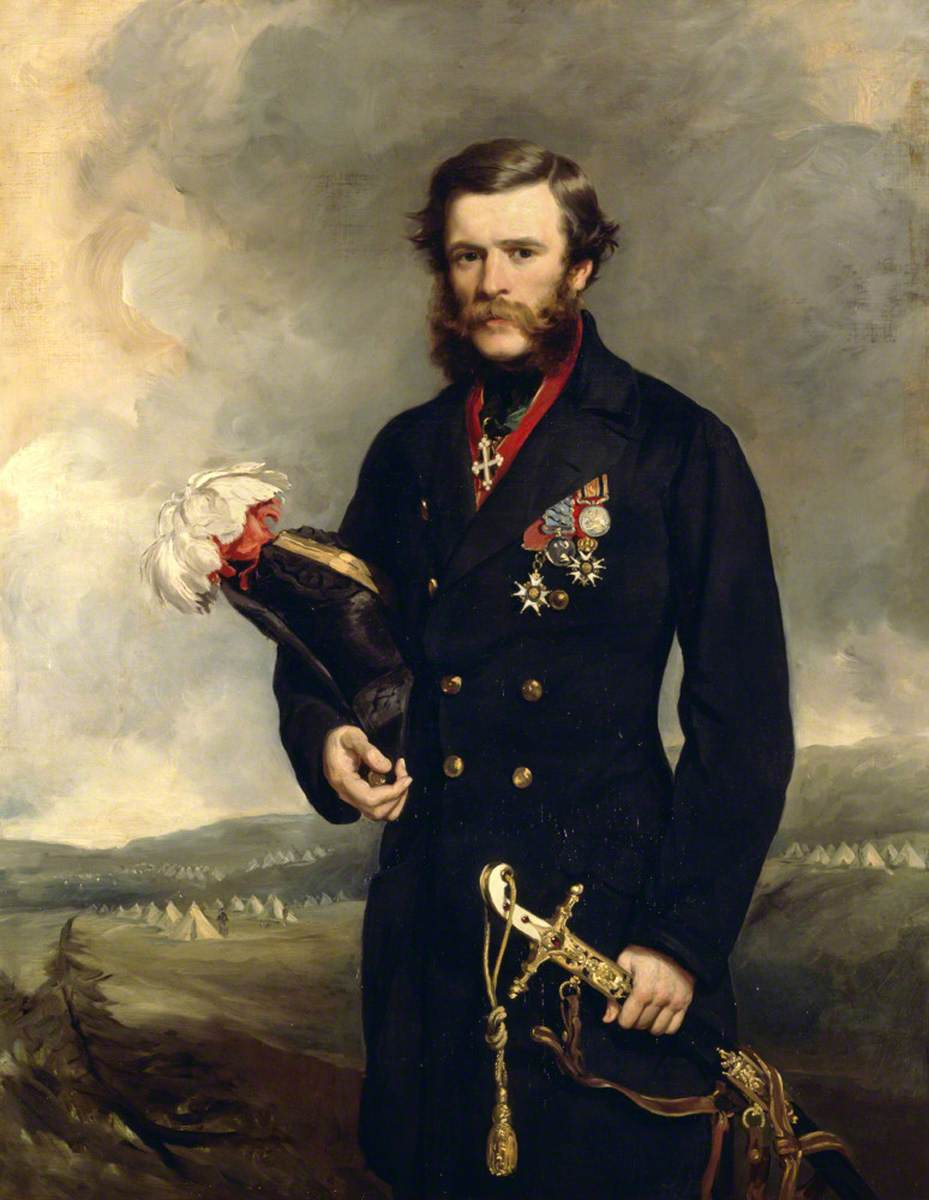
Portrait of Percy Egerton Herbert by Francis Grant

== Bibliography ==
- Murray, Peter. Daniel Maclise, 1806-1870: Romancing the Past. Crawford Art Gallery, 2009.
- Needham, Gerald. 19th-century Realist Art. Harper & Row, 1988.
