= Beatrix Knighting Esmond =

Painting by Augustus Leopold Egg

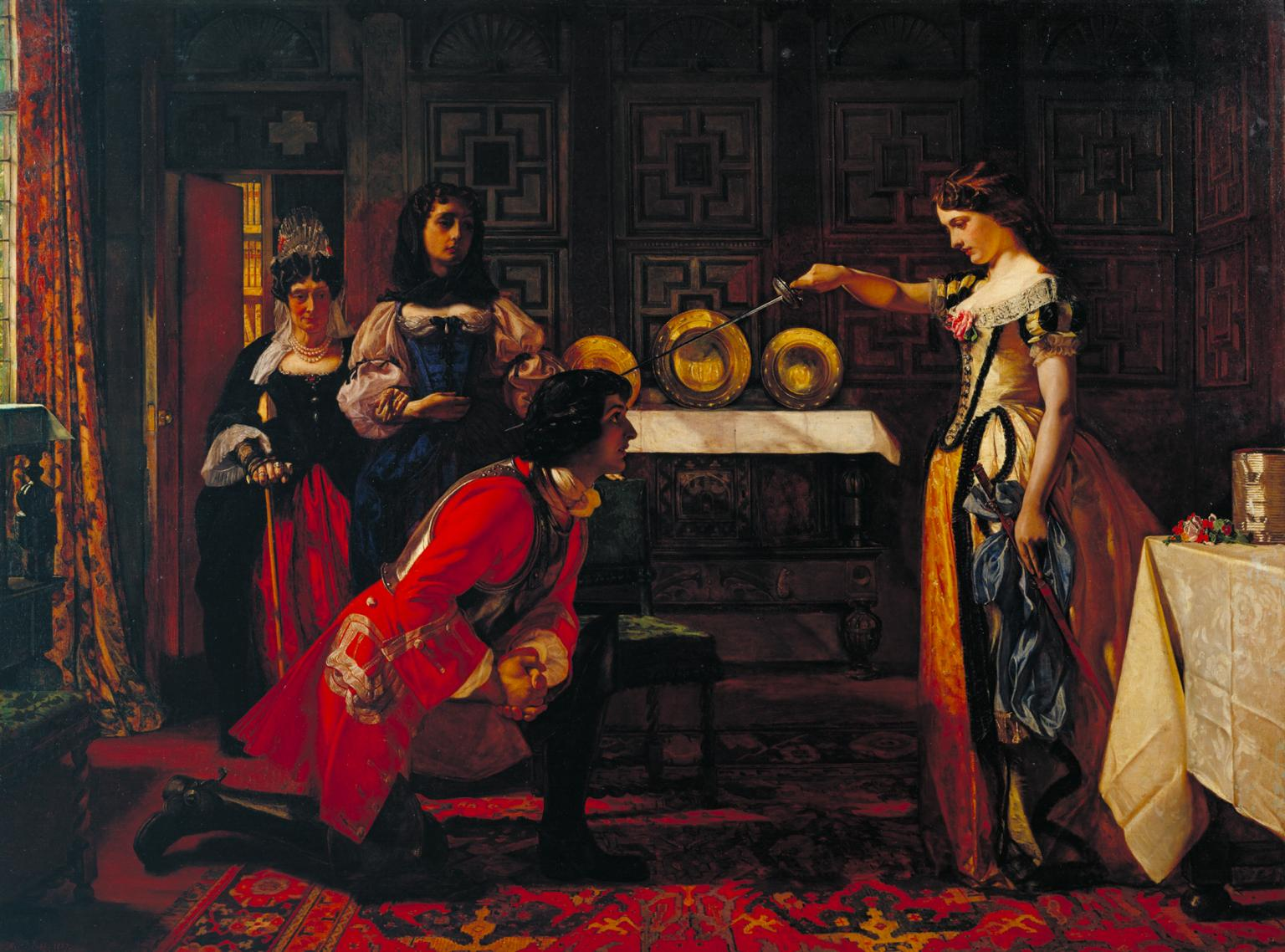
- Artist: Augustus Leopold Egg
- Year: 1857
- Type: Oil on canvas, genre painting
- Dimensions: 86.9 cm × 117.1 cm (34.2 in × 46.1 in)
- Location: Tate Britain, London

Beatrix Knighting Esmond is an 1857 oil painting by the British artist Augustus Leopold Egg. It illustrates a scene from the popular 1852 novel The History of Henry Esmond by William Makepeace Thackeray. The protagonist Henry Edmond is shown being "knighted" by Beatrix in gratitude for his protection of her brother Lord Castlewood. Such adaptations of well-known literature were popular during the Victorian era. It was produced as a pendant painting to Esmond Returns after the Battle of Wynendel from the same book.

Egg was part of The Clique, a group of artists who emerged in the late 1830s and often devoted themselves to history paintings or scenes of everyday life. This picture as displayed at the Royal Academy Exhibition of 1858 held at the National Gallery in London. It is now part of the collection of the Tate Britain, having been acquired in 1893.

== Bibliography ==
- Bury, Stephen (ed.) Benezit Dictionary of British Graphic Artists and Illustrators, Volume 1. OUP, 2012.
- Rogers, Pat (ed.) The Oxford Illustrated History of English Literature. Oxford University Press, 2001.
