= Queen Victoria at the Tomb of Napoleon =

Painting by Edward Matthew Ward

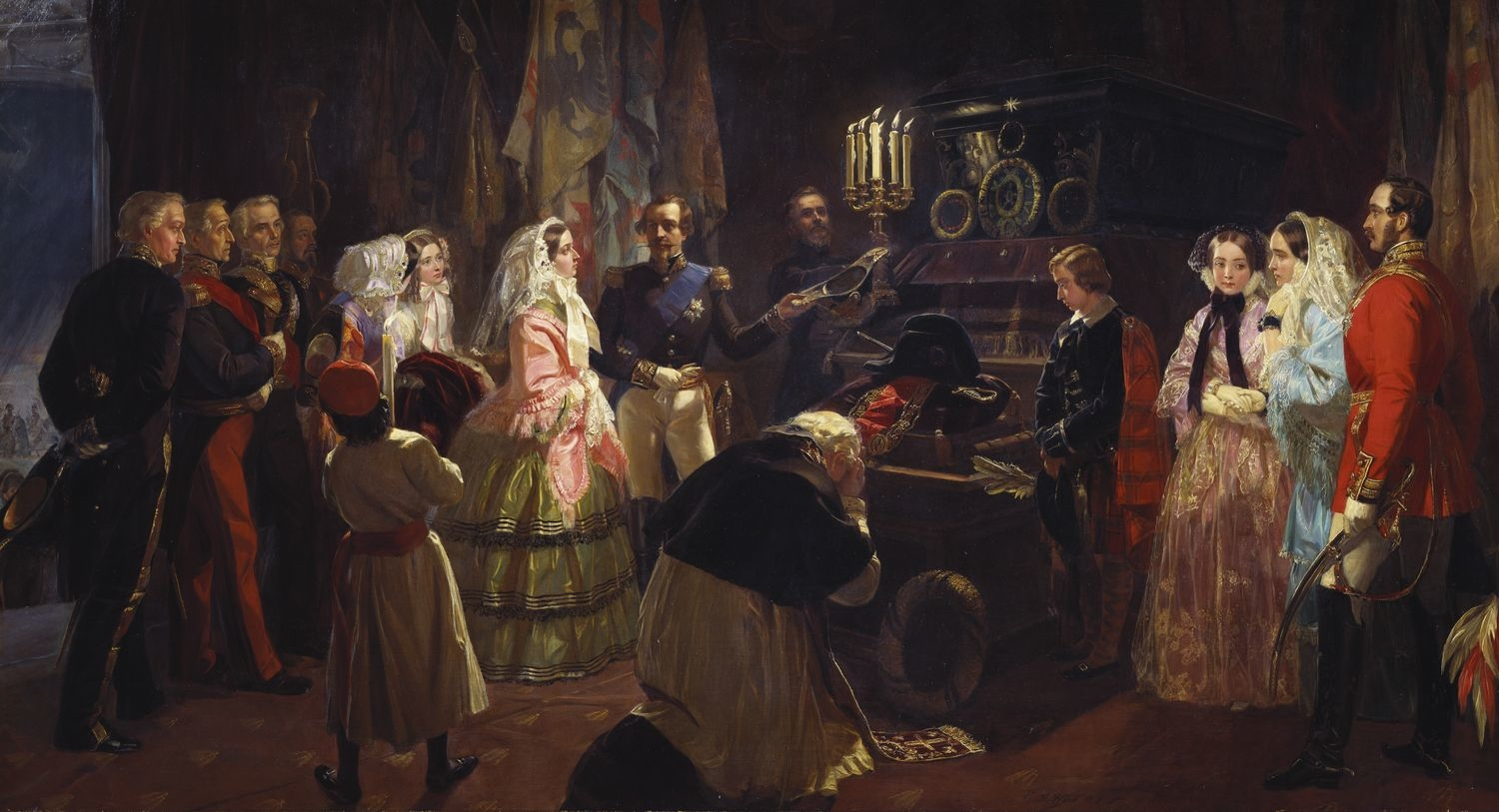
- Artist: Edward Matthew Ward
- Year: 1860
- Type: Oil on canvas, history painting
- Dimensions: 96.6 cm × 175.6 cm (38.0 in × 69.1 in)
- Location: Royal Collection

Queen Victoria at the Tomb of Napoleon is an 1860 history painting by the British artist Edward Matthew Ward. It depicts the visit of Queen Victoria to the Tomb of Napoleon at the Les Invalides in Paris on 24 August 1855. She is accompanied by Napoleon III, the current French Emperor, and her husband Prince Albert and her eldest children the Prince of Wales and Princess Royal. Victoria was on a state visit to Paris, which coincided with the Exposition Universelle held in Paris. The historic former enemies were now close allies and fighting in the Crimean War together, something that the Queen herself noted. Napoleon's remains has been returned to France in 1840 with British approval.

Edward Matthew Ward had been a member of The Clique and became known during the Victorian era for his paintings of scenes from British history. The picture was commissioned by Victoria soon after the visit. The painting was finished in time to be displayed at the Royal Academy Exhibition of 1858 at the National Gallery in London However Ward, substantially retouched the painting and it wasnt finally complete until 1860.

Ward also produced a companion piece The Investiture of Napoleon III with the Order of the Garter to commemorate Napoleon III's visit to Britain earlier the same year.

== Bibliography ==
- Ames, Winslow. Prince Albert and Victorian Taste. Viking Press, 1968
- Dafforne, James. The Life and Works of Edward Matthew Ward. Virtue and Company, 1879.
