= David Roberts (painter) =

Scottish orientalist painter (1796–1864)

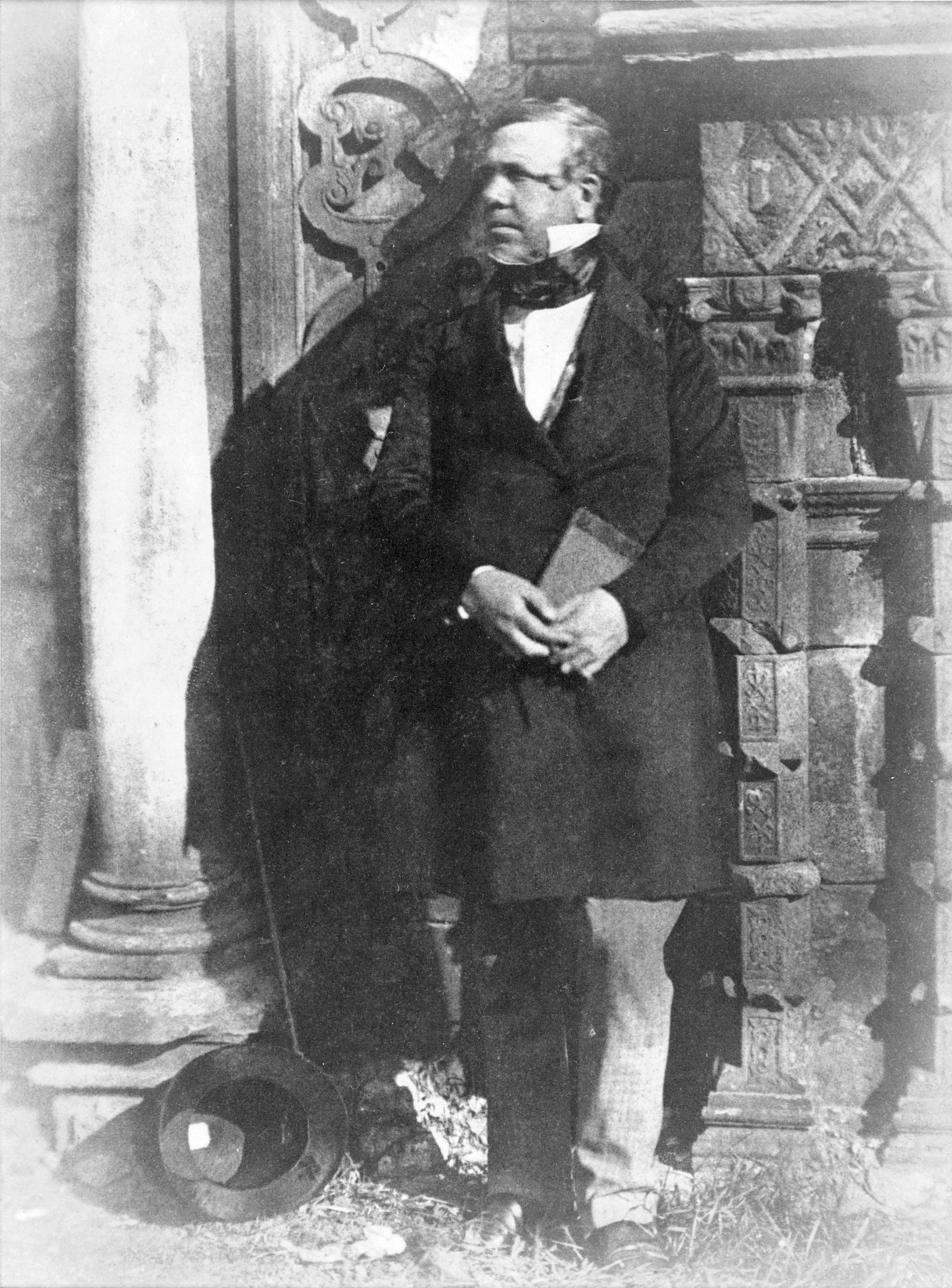
- Roberts in 1844 by Hill & Adamson
- Born: 24 October 1796; Stockbridge near Edinburgh, Scotland
- Died: 25 November 1864 (aged 68); London, England
- Movement: Orientalism
- Elected: Royal Academician

David Roberts RA RBA (24 October 1796 – 25 November 1864) was a Scottish painter. He is especially known for The Holy Land, Syria, Idumea, Arabia, Egypt, and Nubia, a prolific series of detailed lithograph prints of Egypt and the Near East that he produced from sketches he made during long tours of the region (1838–1840). These and his large oil paintings of similar subjects made him a prominent Orientalist painter. He was elected as a Royal Academician in 1841.

== Early life ==
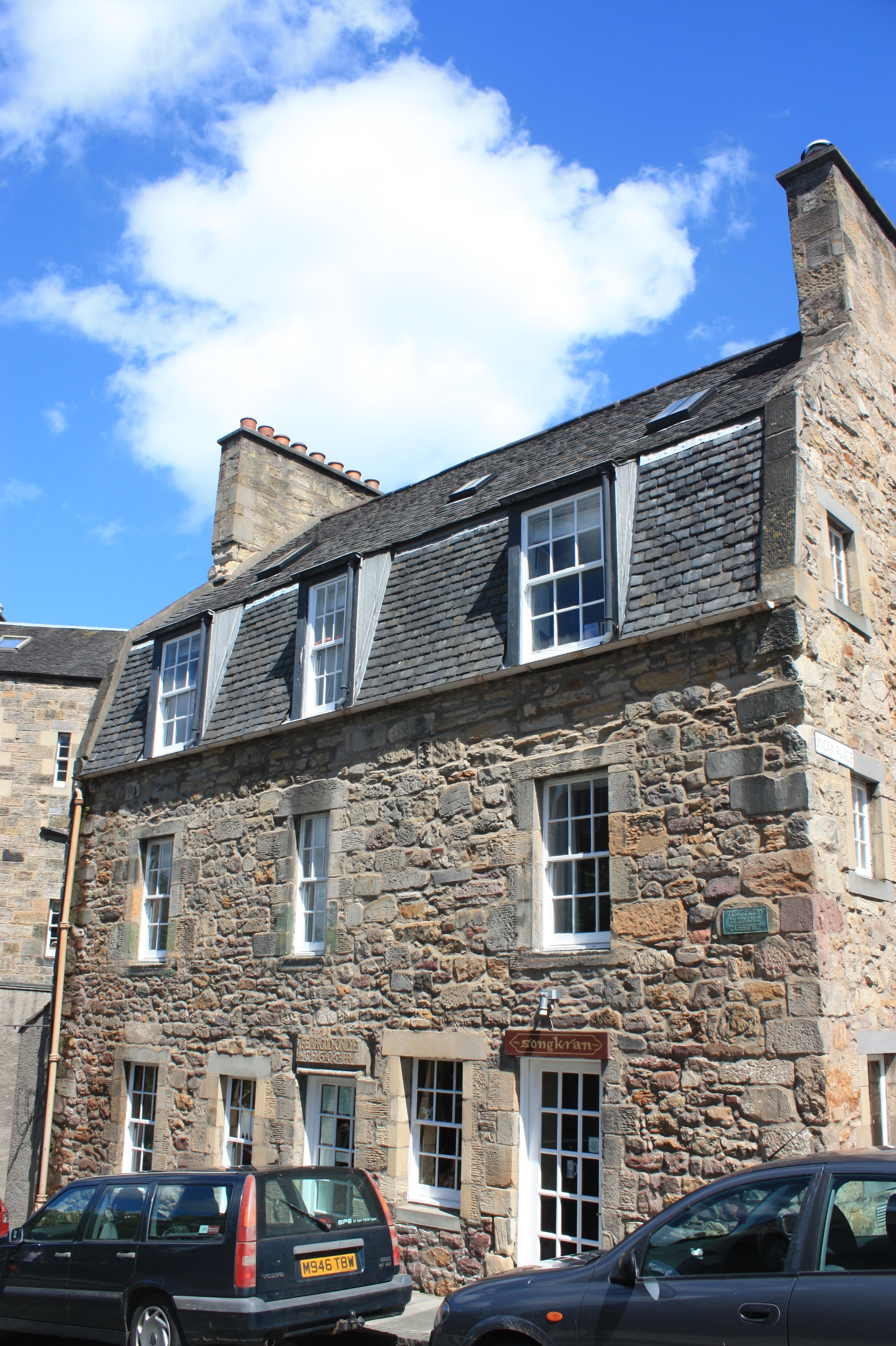
Duncan's Land, Stockbridge, Edinburgh

David Roberts was born at Edinburgh in Scotland, the eldest son of John Roberts and his wife Christian. He was apprenticed for seven years to house painter and decorator Gavin Beugo; his fellow apprentice was David Ramsay Hay, who became a lifelong friend. During this time he studied art in the evenings. After his apprenticeship was complete, Roberts's first paid job came in the summer of 1815, when he moved to Perth to serve as foreman for the redecoration of Scone Palace. Roberts returned in the spring of 1816 and lived with his parents while looking for work.

His next job was to paint scenery for James Bannister's circus on North College Street, launching a career as a painter and designer of stage scenery. Bannister liked Roberts's set designs and on 10 April 1816 engaged him at a salary of 25 shillings per week to travel with the circus on a tour of England. Roberts departed Edinburgh with the circus later the same month and travelled to Carlisle, Newcastle, Hull and York, returning to Edinburgh in January 1817. During his time with the circus, Roberts was called on to take several minor stage roles as a foil for the clowns' skits.

For the first few months of 1817, Roberts worked as the stage designer's assistant at the Pantheon Theatre in Edinburgh, a new joint venture between Bannister and an Italian musician named Corri. However the Pantheon was a financial failure and closed in May 1817, putting Roberts out of work. He reluctantly returned to house painting, working on the mansion house of Abercairny, near Perth, designed by Gillespie Graham. Although he was working from 5 a.m. to 7 p.m. he took the opportunity to sketch in the woods around the mansion in the evening. He followed this up with a stint painting imitation wood and marble at a mansion at Condie, near Bridge of Earn, in Perthshire. At the urging of his parents, Roberts returned to Edinburgh in January 1818, where he took employment with John Jackson, a decorative painter. Working for Jackson during 1818, Roberts decorated Lord Lauderdale's Dunbar House (known later as Lauderdale House) and then the library of Craigcrook Castle for Lord Jeffrey, who had recently leased the property.

In 1818, the Pantheon Theatre reopened in Edinburgh. Initially, a company from London with their own scene painters was in residence, but after they left, Roberts was able to get work from Corri as a scene painter. While Corri offered Roberts the position on 25 July 1818, he was already committed to house-painting work for Jackson and was unable to start at the Pantheon until the winter season. As there was no separate painting room, Roberts had to paint sets directly on the stage, which was occupied by rehearsals during the day and performances in the evening. Therefore, Roberts generally began work after the evening production had finished, working through the night. Roberts's work was noticed by the stage-manager, Mr. Monro. After the Pantheon closed, Monro moved on to the Theatre Royal, Glasgow, where he arranged for Roberts to be hired as a principal scene-painter.

In 1819, Roberts became the scene painter at the Theatre Royal in Edinburgh (having at this time James Ballantine as his apprentice). There Roberts met the Scottish actress Margaret McLachlan, said to be the illegitimate daughter of a Highland gypsy girl and a clan chief. They married in 1820, "for pure love". Although the marriage did not last long, it produced Roberts' only daughter, Christine, who was born in 1821.

Although he was making a living from scene painting, it was around this time that Roberts began to produce oil paintings seriously. In 1821 he became friends with the artist William Clarkson Stanfield, who joined him to paint scenery at the Theatre Royal, and Roberts developed his love of landscape painting. In 1821 the Fine Arts Institution of Edinburgh accepted three of Roberts's paintings – views of Melrose and Dryburgh abbeys – two of which sold. At Stanfield's suggestion, Roberts also sent three pictures to the 1822 Exhibition of Works by Living Artists, held in Edinburgh.

== Move to London ==
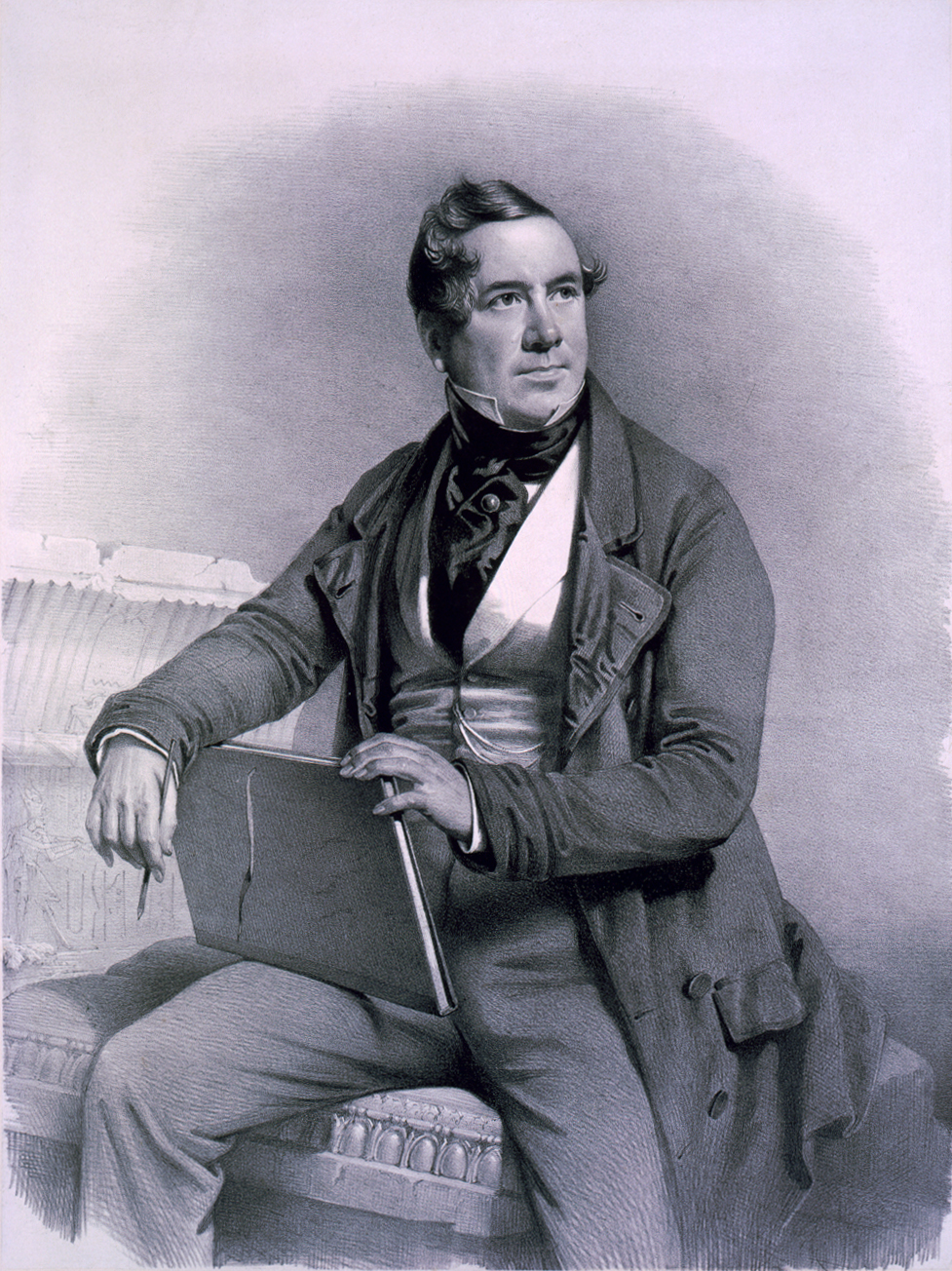
Roberts in 1842

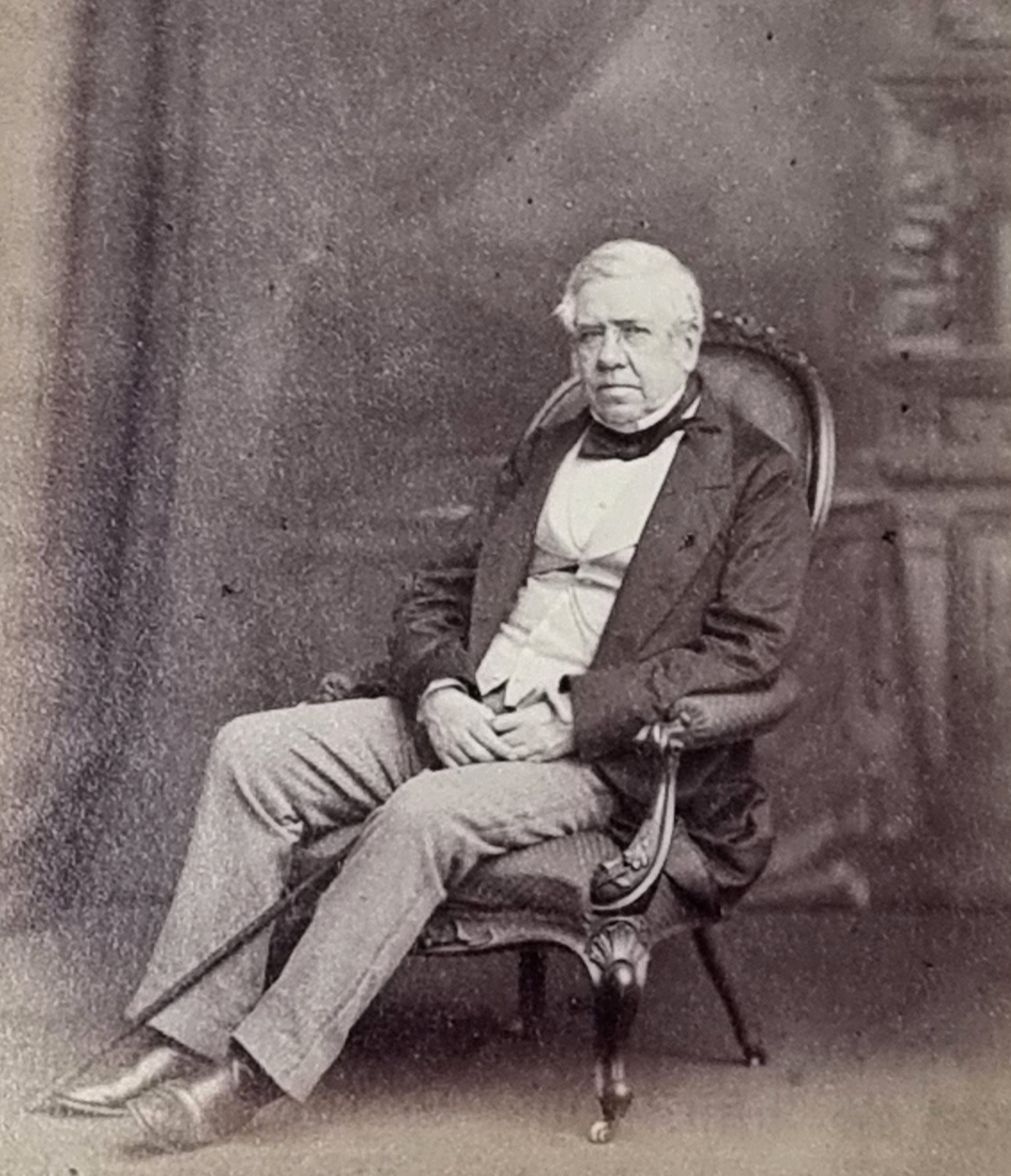
Portrait of David Roberts, by Ernest Edwards, c. 1863

In 1822 the Coburg Theatre, now the Old Vic in London, offered Roberts a job as a scenic designer and stage painter. He sailed from Leith with his wife and their six-month-old Christine and settled in London. After working for a while at the Coburg Theatre, Roberts moved to the Theatre Royal, Drury Lane to create dioramas and panoramas with Stanfield.

A miniature by Roberts from this time shows Margaret as a delicate woman with blonde ringlets, holding the smiling three-year-old Christine. But Roberts' family life was not as idyllic as this picture suggests: Margaret had become an alcoholic, and eventually, in 1831, Roberts sent her back to Scotland to be cared for by friends. Roberts may have burned some letters from this period in shame at his wife's drinking problem, but he was unusually frank in a letter to a friend, David Ramsay Hay. Roberts and Hay had been an apprentices together, and Hay had been seeing a mistress since his own wife had started drinking.

"If you do not know our cases are almost parallel. Yours is not as bad as mine, having some consolation. The state of my nerves is such I can scarcely write. But thank God she leaves tomorrow—I hope for ever."

In 1824, he exhibited another view of Dryburgh Abbey at the British Institution and sent two works to the first exhibition of the newly formed Society of British Artists. In the autumn of 1824 he visited Normandy. His paintings based on this trip began to lay the foundation of his reputation; one of them, a view of Rouen Cathedral, sold for 80 guineas.

While he built his reputation as a fine artist, Roberts's stage work had also been commercially successful. Commissions from Covent Garden included the sets for the London premiere of Mozart's Die Entführung aus dem Serail (The Abduction from the Seraglio) in 1827, scenery for a pantomime depicting the naval victory of Navarino, and two panoramas that he executed jointly with Stanfield.

During the second part of the 1820s, and in addition to English and Scottish scenes, Roberts painted views of prominent buildings in France and the Low Countries including Amiens, Caen, Dieppe, Rouen, Antwerp, Brussels and Ghent, sometimes making several paintings of the same scene with only minor variations.

By 1829 he was working full-time as a fine artist. That year, he exhibited The Departure of the Israelites, in which his style first became apparent. In 1831, the Society of British Artists elected him as their president.

== Travel to Spain ==
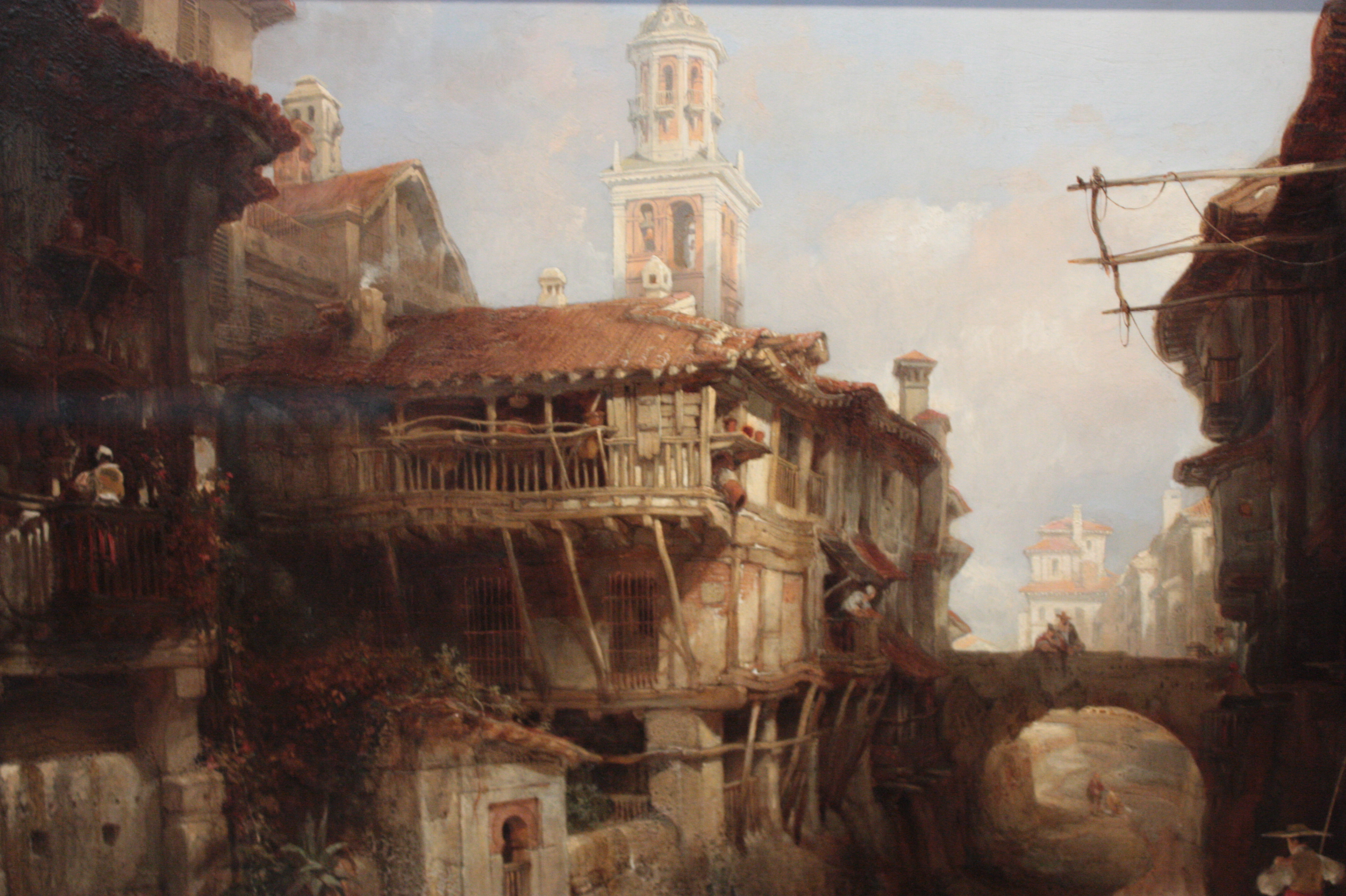
Old Buildings on the Darro, Granada (detail), by David Roberts, 1834

In 1832 he traveled in Spain and Tangiers. He returned at the end of 1833 with a supply of sketches that he elaborated into attractive and popular paintings. The British Institution exhibited his Interior of Seville Cathedral in 1834, and he sold it for £300. He executed a fine series of Spanish illustrations for the Landscape Annual of 1836. Then in 1837 a selection of his Picturesque Sketches in Spain was reproduced by lithography.

In London he made the acquaintance of artists such as Edward Thomas Daniell and John Linnell, who frequented Daniel's house.

== Travel to Egypt and the Holy Land ==
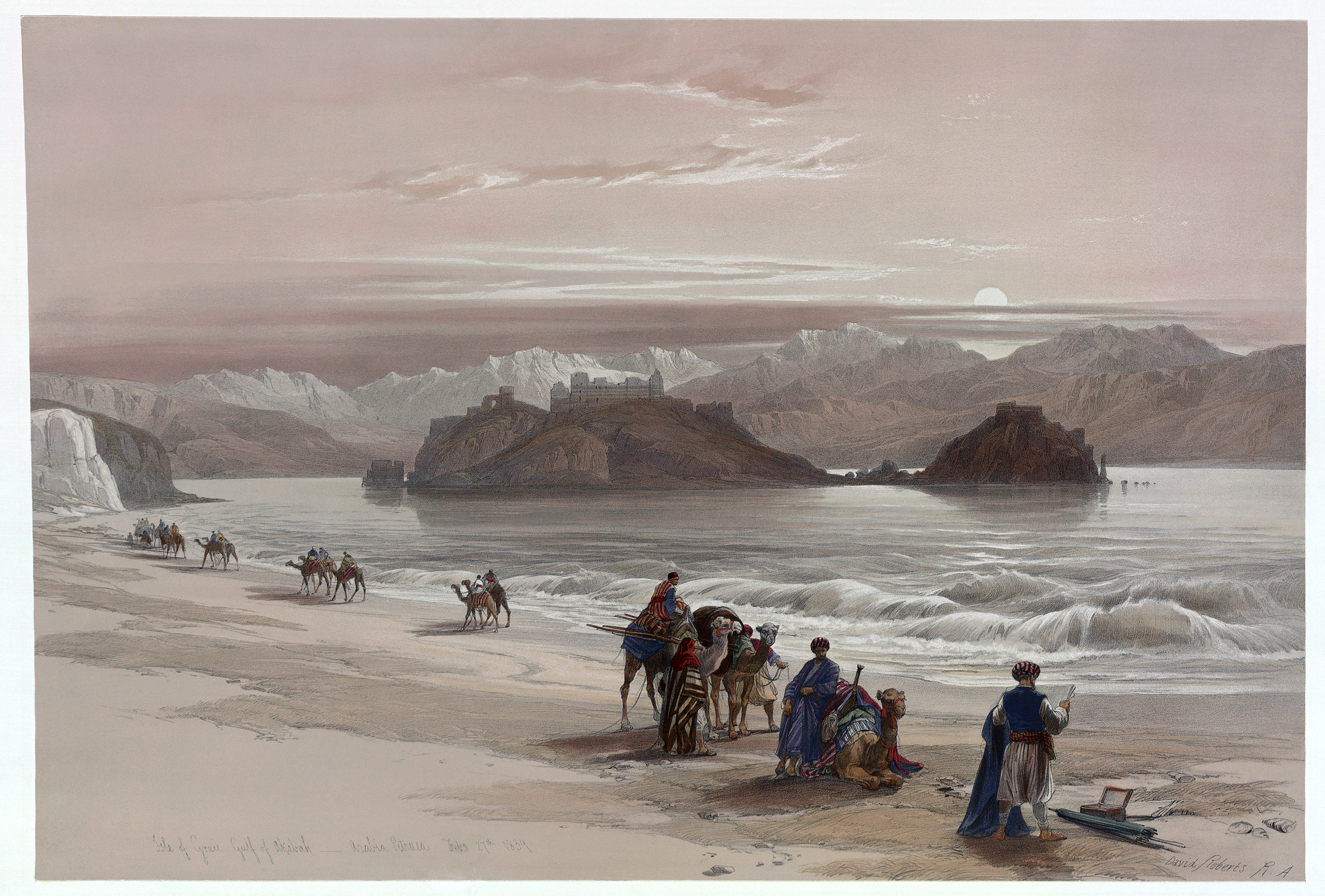
Isle of Graia Gulf of Akabah Arabia Petraea, 1839 lithograph of a trade caravan by Louis Haghe from an original by David Roberts

J. M. W. Turner persuaded Roberts to abandon scene painting and devote himself to becoming a full-time artist. Roberts set sail for Egypt on 31 August 1838, a few years after Owen Jones. His intent was to produce drawings that he could later use as the basis for paintings and lithographs to sell to the public. Egypt was much in vogue at this time, and travellers, collectors and lovers of antiquities were keen to buy works inspired by the East or depicting the great monuments of ancient Egypt.

Roberts made a long tour in Egypt, Nubia, the Sinai, the Holy Land, Jordan and Lebanon. Throughout, he produced a vast collection of drawings and watercolour sketches.

Muhammad Ali Pasha received Roberts in Alexandria on 16 May 1839, shortly before his return to the UK. He later reproduced this scene, apparently from memory, in Volume 3 of Egypt & Nubia.

== Return to Britain ==
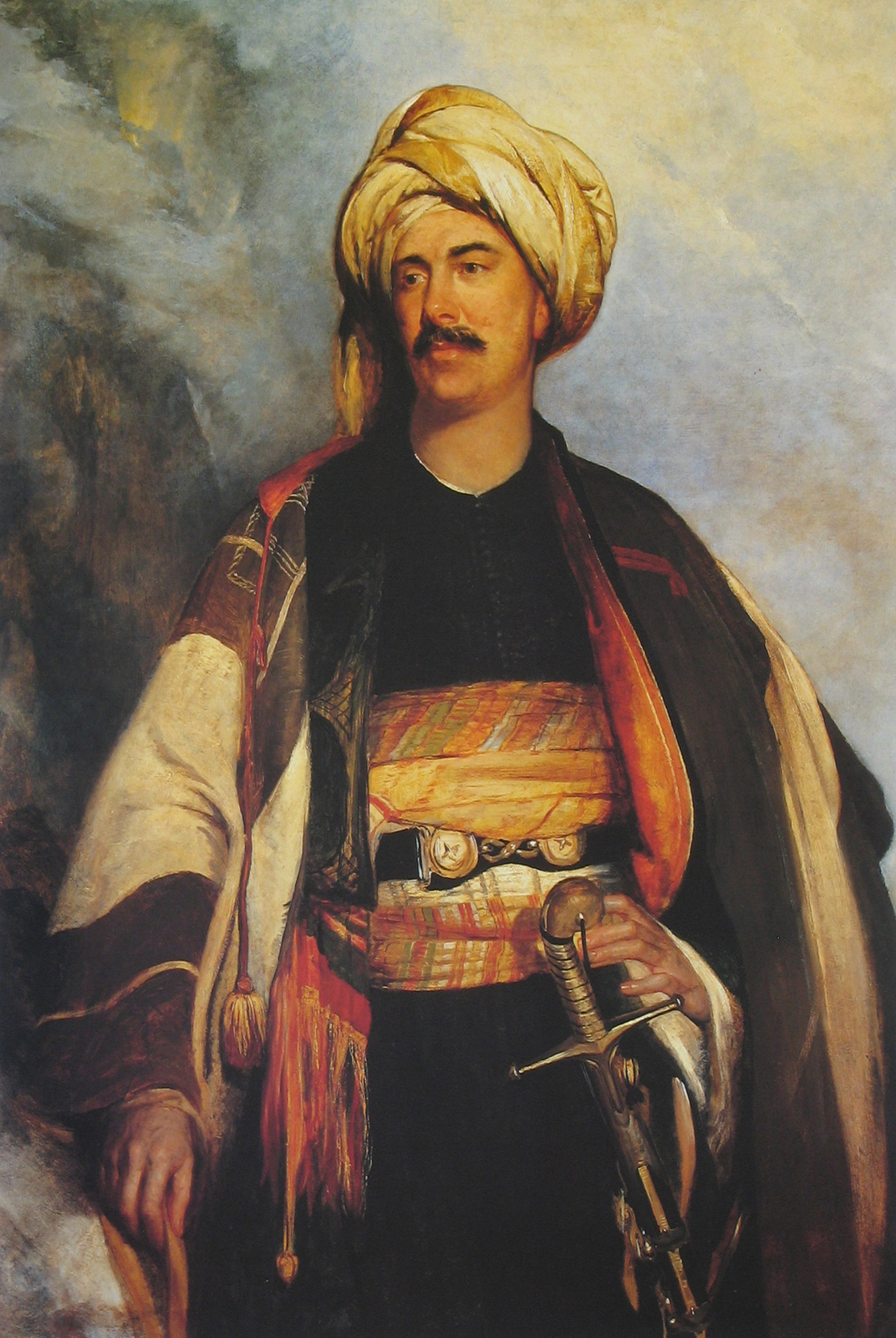
Portrait of David Roberts, by Robert Scott Lauder. (1840).

Upon Roberts's return to Edinburgh in 1840, his fellow-artist, Robert Scott Lauder, painted his portrait. (In 1980, the National Gallery of Scotland purchased the portrait.) Scottish society fêted him. For instance, he was the guest of honour at a dinner on 19 October 1842, at which Lord Cockburn presided.

On his return to Britain, Roberts worked with lithographer Louis Haghe from 1842 to 1849 to produce the lavishly illustrated plates of The Holy Land, Syria, Idumea, Arabia, Egypt, and Nubia, originally published as Sketches in the Holy Land and Syria, 1842–1849 and Egypt & Nubia series. He funded the work through advance subscriptions which he solicited directly. The scenery and monuments of Egypt and Holy Land were fashionable but had hitherto been hardly touched by British artists, and so Roberts quickly accumulated 400 subscription commitments, with Queen Victoria being subscriber No. 1. Her complete set is still in the Royal Collection. The timing of publication just before photographs of the sites became available proved fortuitous.

== Later life ==
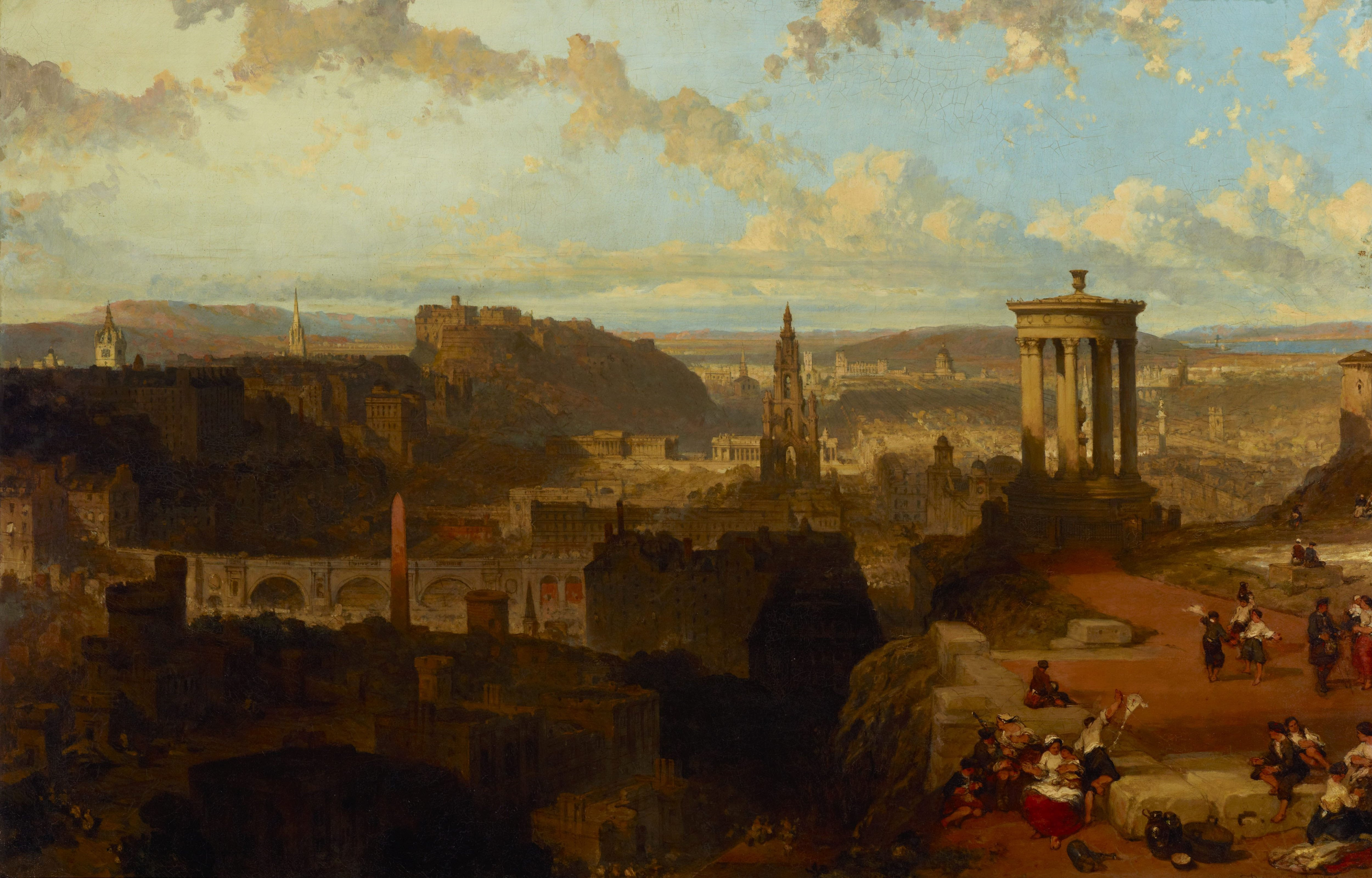
Edinburgh from the Calton Hill, 1858

In 1851, and again in 1853, Roberts visited Italy, painting the Ducal Palace, Venice, bought by Lord Londesborough, the Interior of the Basilica of St Peters, Rome, Christmas Day, 1853, and Rome from the Convent of St Onofrio, presented to the Royal Scottish Academy. In 1853 he exhibited a picture painted by command of Queen Victoria, title the 'Inauguration of the Exhibition of 1851,' it depicted the opening of the Great Exhibition of 1851

His last volume of illustrations, Italy, Classical, Historical and Picturesque, was published in 1859. In 1839 he was elected an associate and in 1841 a full member of the Royal Academy; and in 1858 he was presented with the freedom of the city of Edinburgh. The last years of his life were occupied with a series of views of London from the Thames. He had executed six of these, and was at work upon a picture of St Paul's Cathedral as seen from Ludgate Hill, when he died suddenly. He collapsed on Berners Street on the afternoon of 25 November 1864 and died at home that evening. The symptoms, described as apoplexy in most histories, were those of a stroke.

He was buried at West Norwood Cemetery in south London.

== Selected works ==
=== Paintings ===
- Departure of the Israelites (1829)
- The Great Staircase, Stafford House (1832), UK Government Art Collection
- Interior of Seville Cathedral (1834)
- A View in Cairo (1840), The Royal Collection, Windsor Castle
- The Temple at Dendera (1841)
- The Gateway to the Great Temple at Baalbec (1841)
- Ruins of the Great Temple at Karnak, in Upper Egypt (1845)
- The Destruction of Jerusalem (1850)
- The Church of the Jesuits, View on the Grand Canal, Venice (1854), Yale Center for British Art, Paul Mellon Collection, New Haven, Connecticut
- Edinburgh from the Calton Hill (1858)
- The Dogana and Santa Maria, Venice (1862) Sheffield Galleries & Museums Trust
- Street in Cairo (Royal Holloway Collection, University of London)
- Pilgrimage to Jerusalem (Royal Holloway Collection, London)

=== Prints ===
- Picturesque Sketches in Spain (London, 1835–36)
- The Holy Land, Syria, Idumea, Arabia, Egypt, and Nubia (London 1842–1849, originally as The Holy Land, Syria, Idumea and Arabia and Egypt and Nubia, in 2x3 volumes.) Link to Images
- Cities of North Africa (London 1852)

=== Journals ===
- Roberts, David, Record Book, 1829–1864, unpublished manuscript, Yale Center for British Art, New Haven.
- Roberts, David, Eastern Journal, 1838–1839, unpublished manuscript, National Library of Scotland, Edinburgh.

== Gallery ==
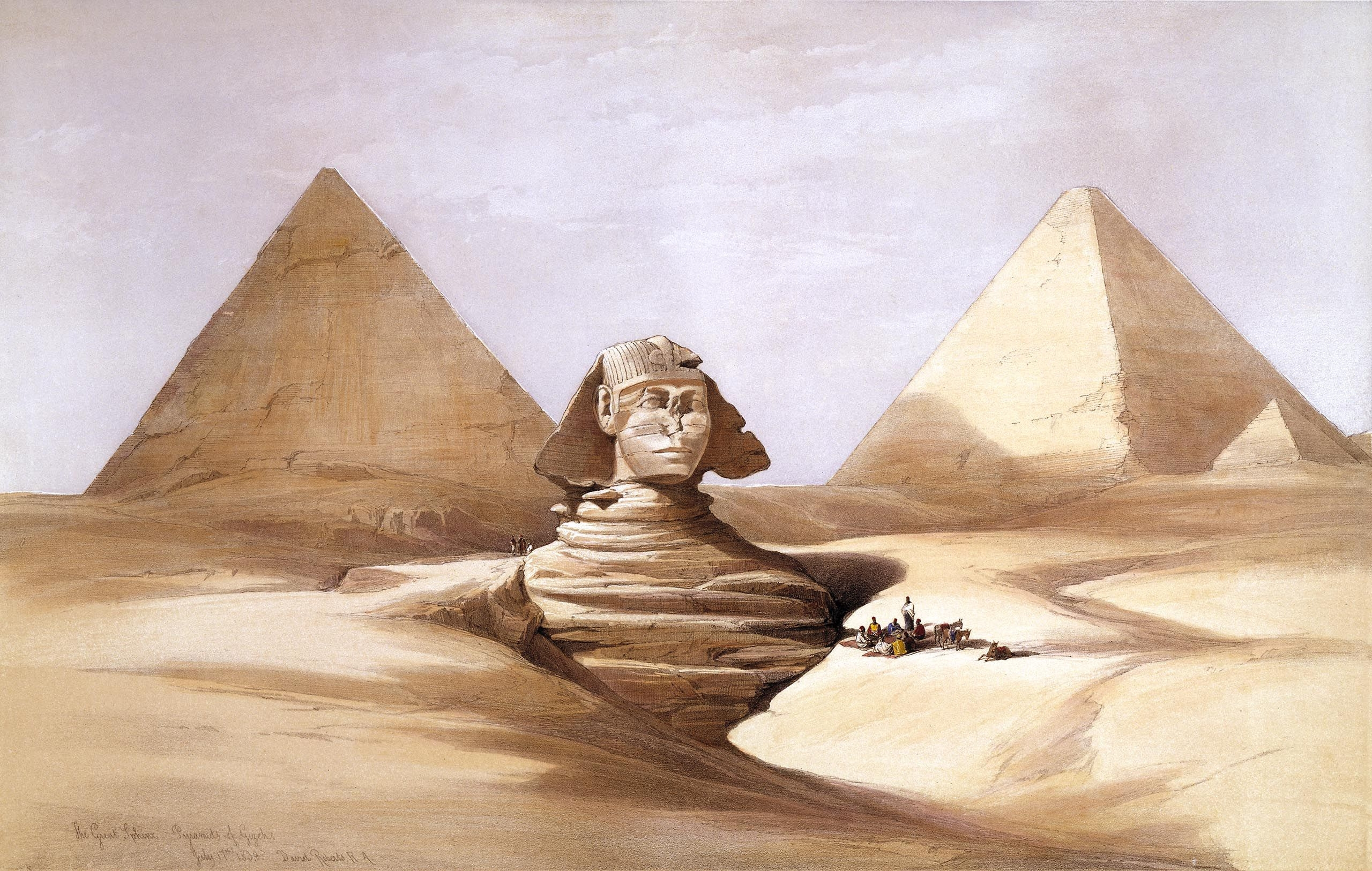
The Great Sphinx (and) Pyramids of Gizeh (Giza) 17 July 1839

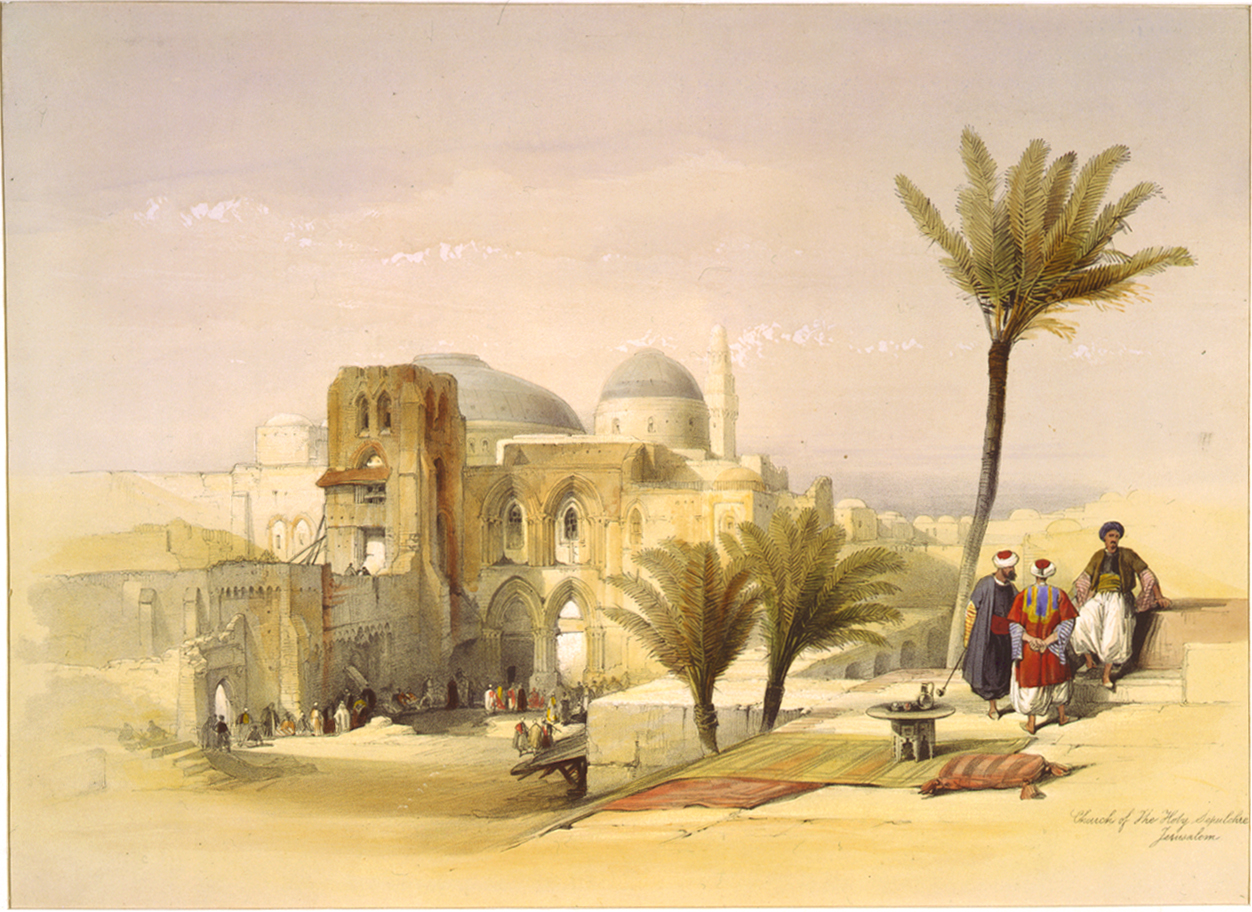
Church of the Holy Sepulchre Jerusalem. Lithograph by Louis Haghe from an original by David Roberts

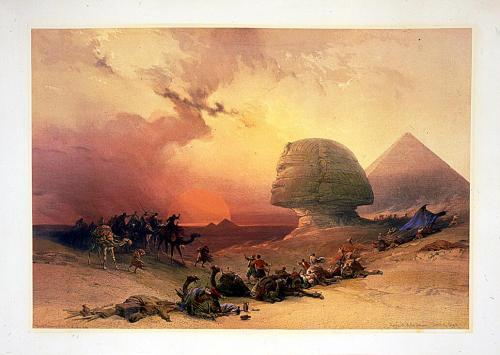
Approach of the Simoom--Desert of Gizeh. Lithograph by Louis Haghe from an original by David Roberts

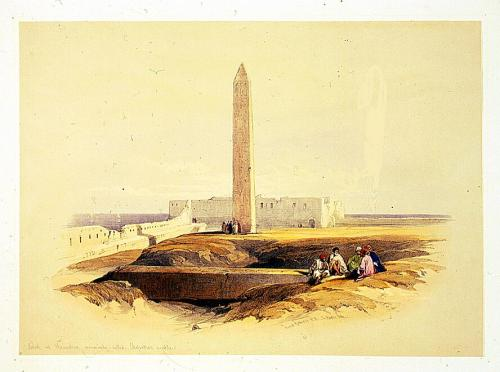
Obelisk at Alexandria Commonly Called Cleopatra's Needle. Lithograph by Louis Haghe from an original by David Roberts

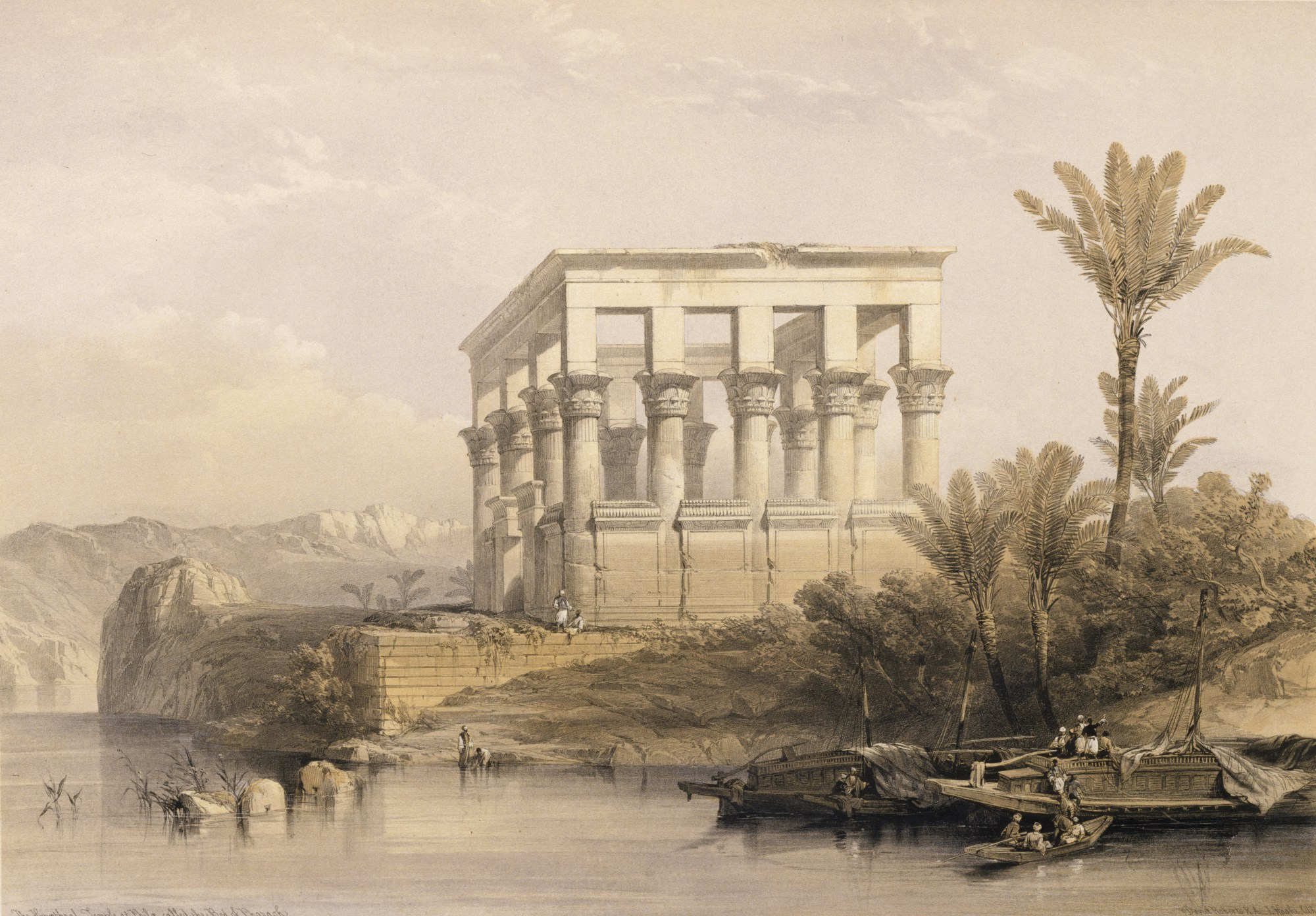
The Hypaethral Temple at Philae called the Bed of Pharaoh. Lithograph by Louis Haghe from an original by David Roberts

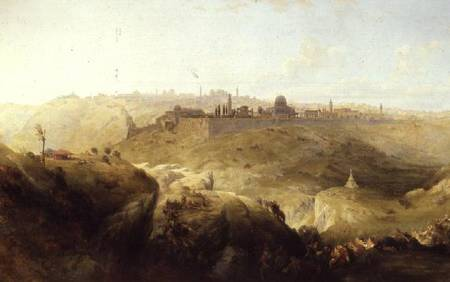
Pilgrimage to Jerusalem

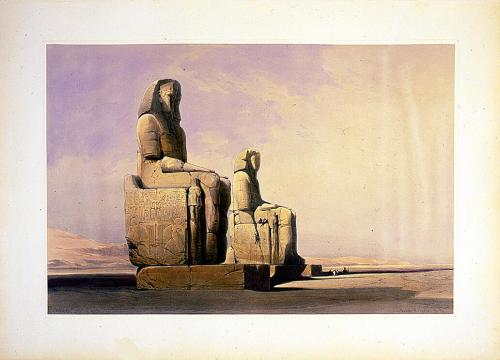
Thebes Dec. 4th, 1838 Lithograph by Louis Haghe from an original by David Roberts

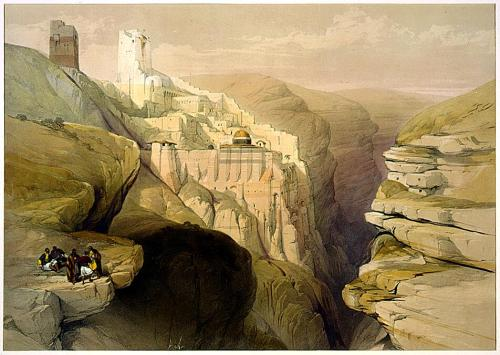
Convent of St Saba 4 April 1839. Lithograph by Louis Haghe from an original by David Roberts

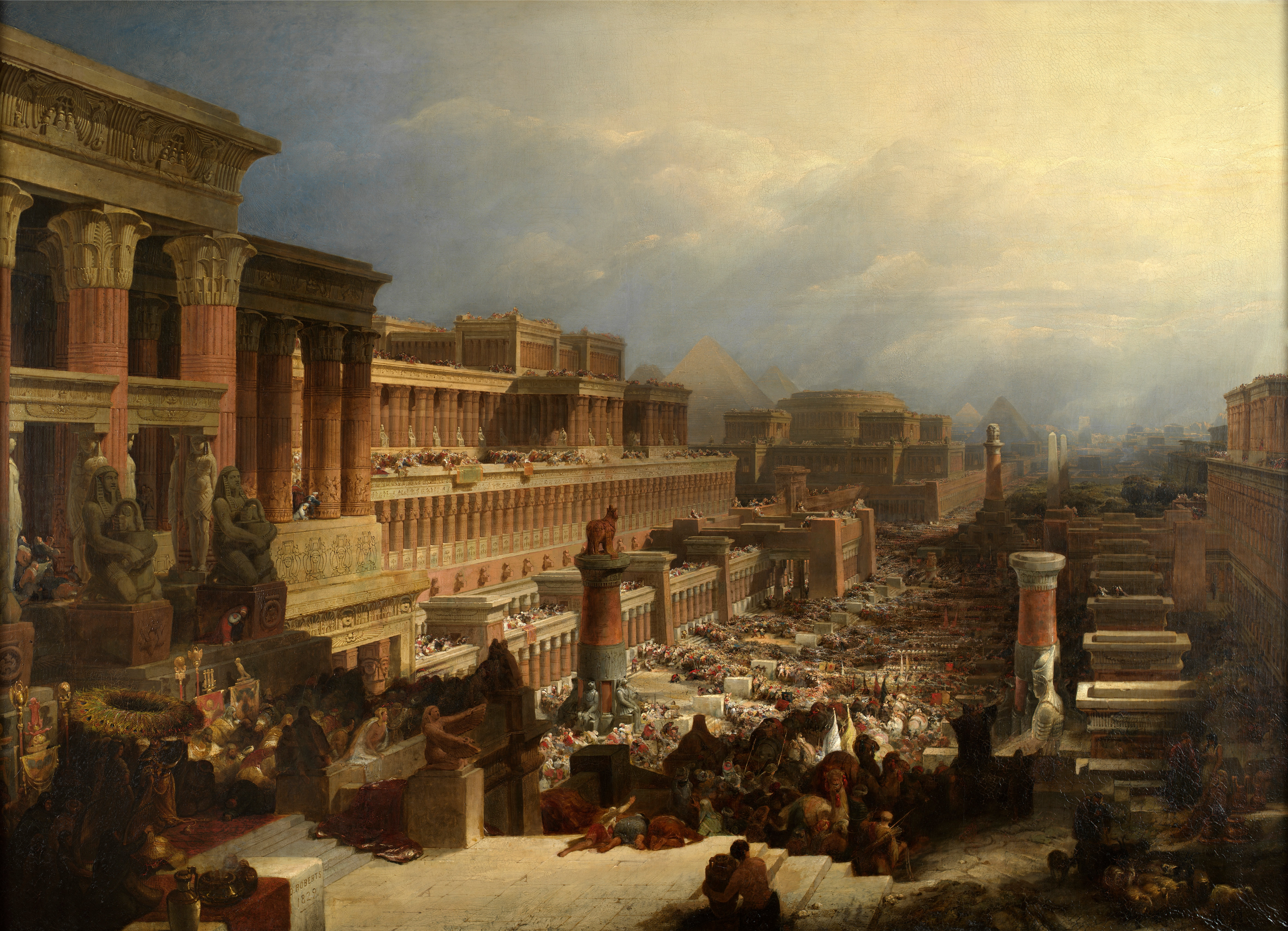
The Departure of the Israelites (1829). Oil on canvas

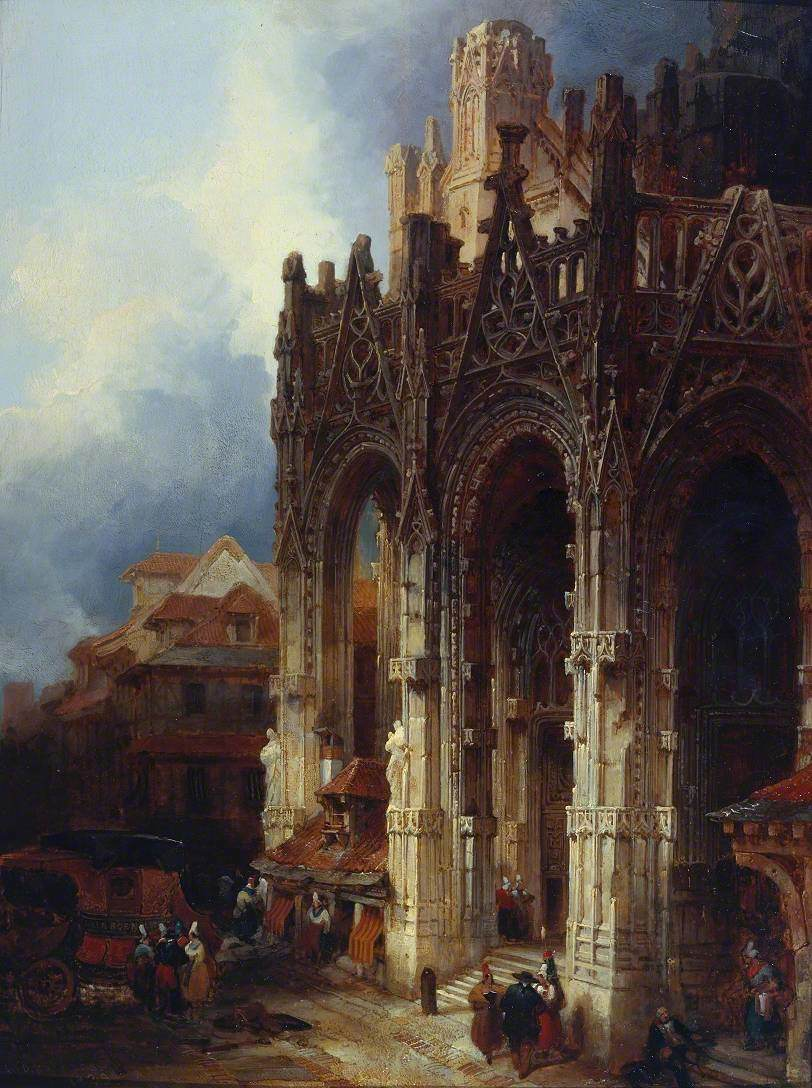
The Porch of St Maclou, Rouen, 1829

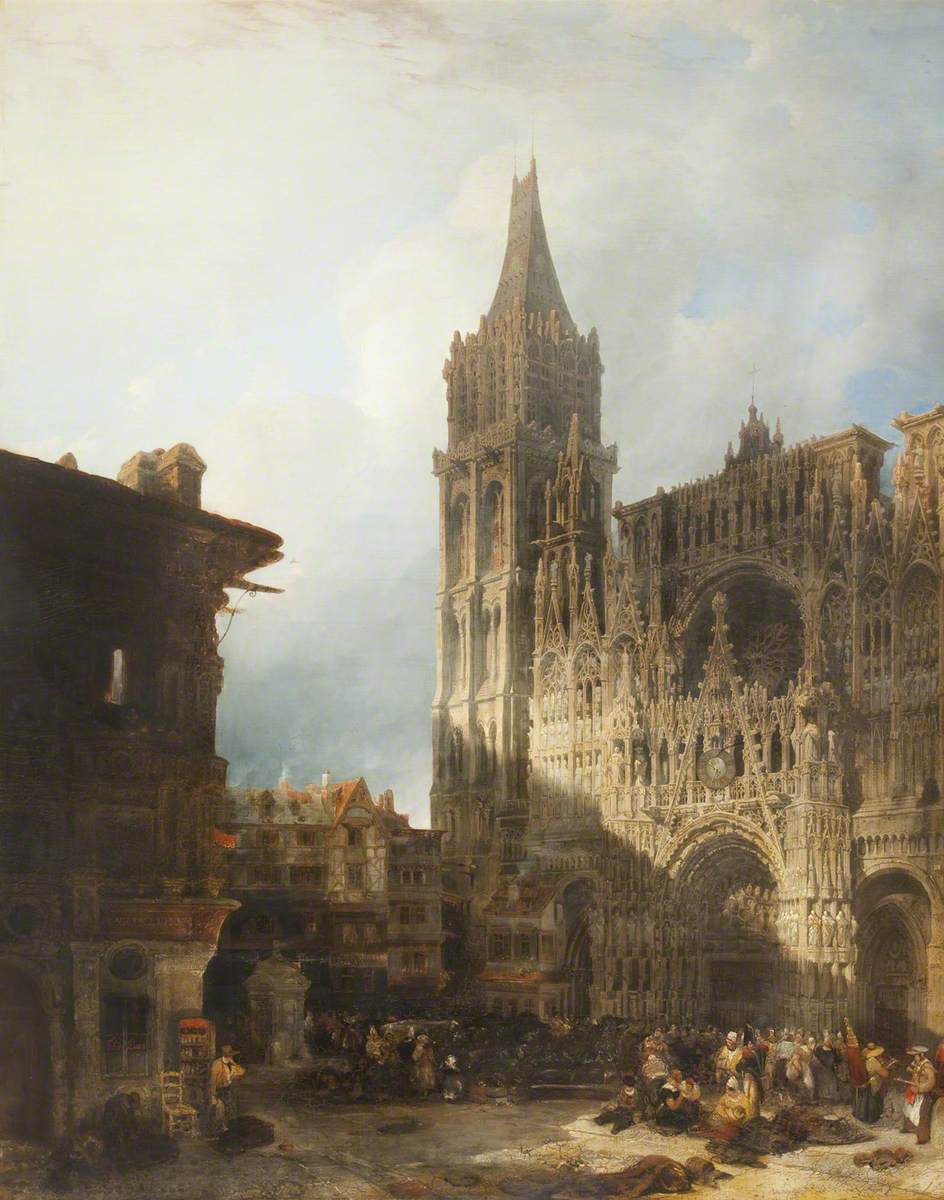
Rouen Cathedral, 1831

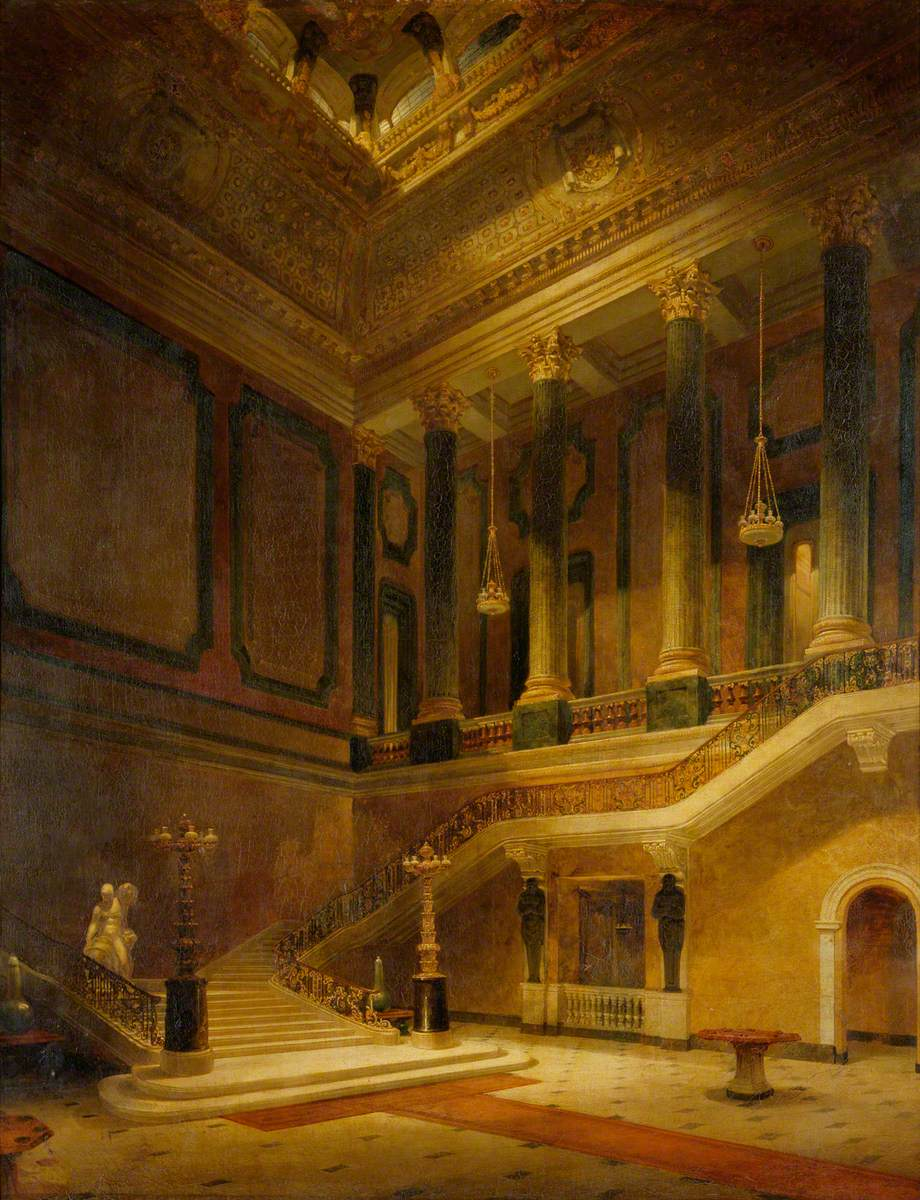
The Great Staircase, Stafford House, 1832

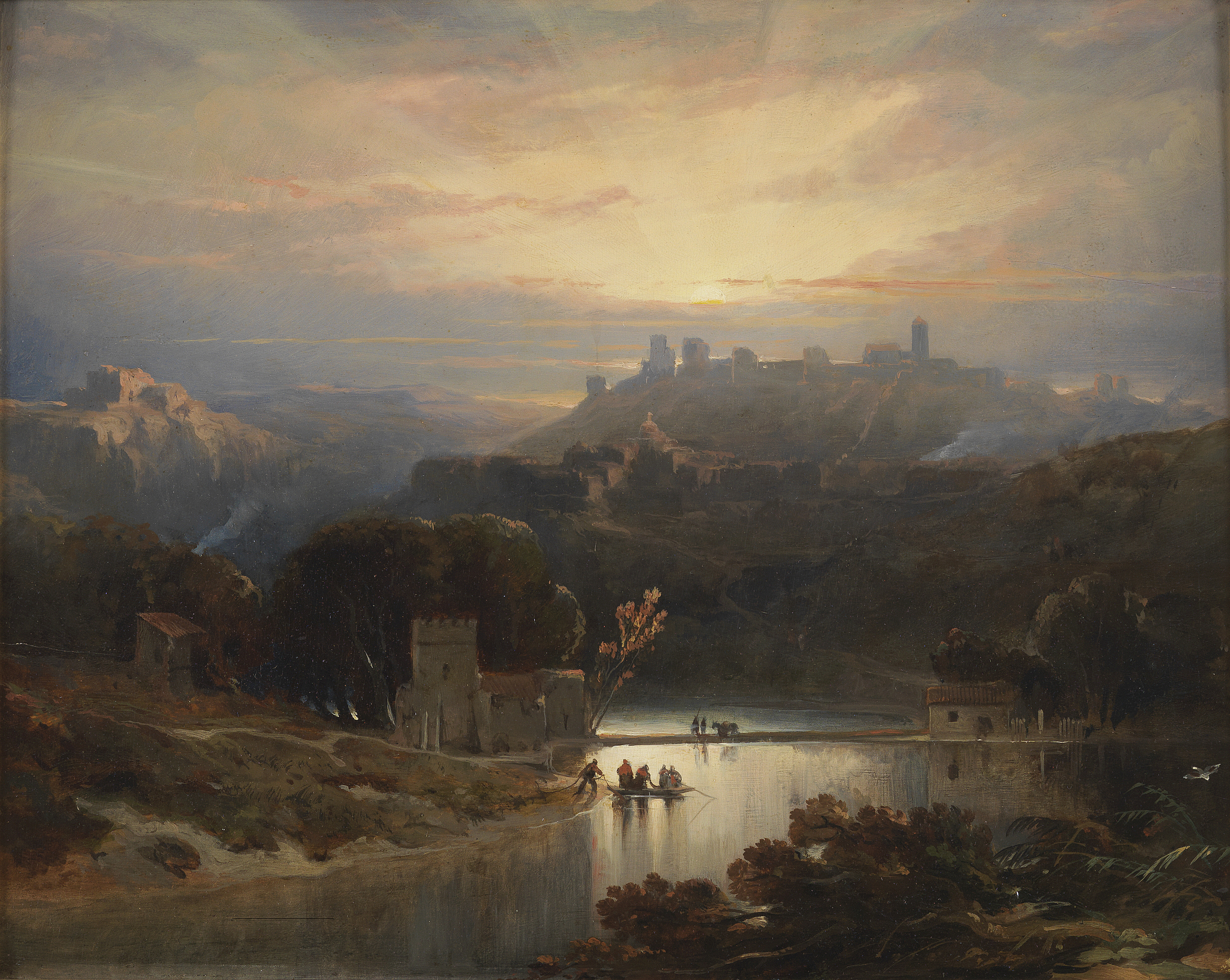
The Castle of Alcalá de Guadaíra, 1833

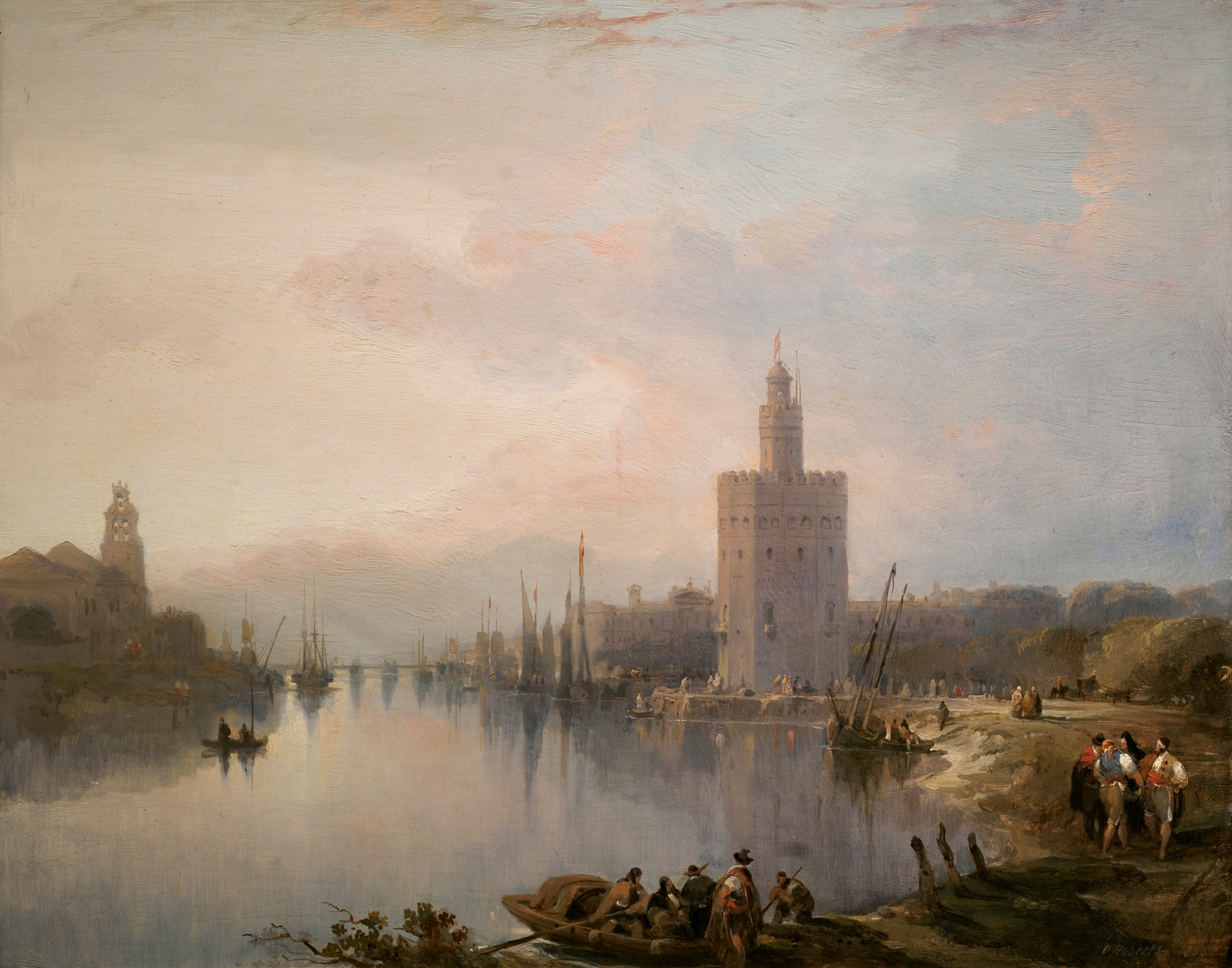
The Torre del Oro, 1833

St Paul's Cathedral with the Lord Mayor's Procession, 1836

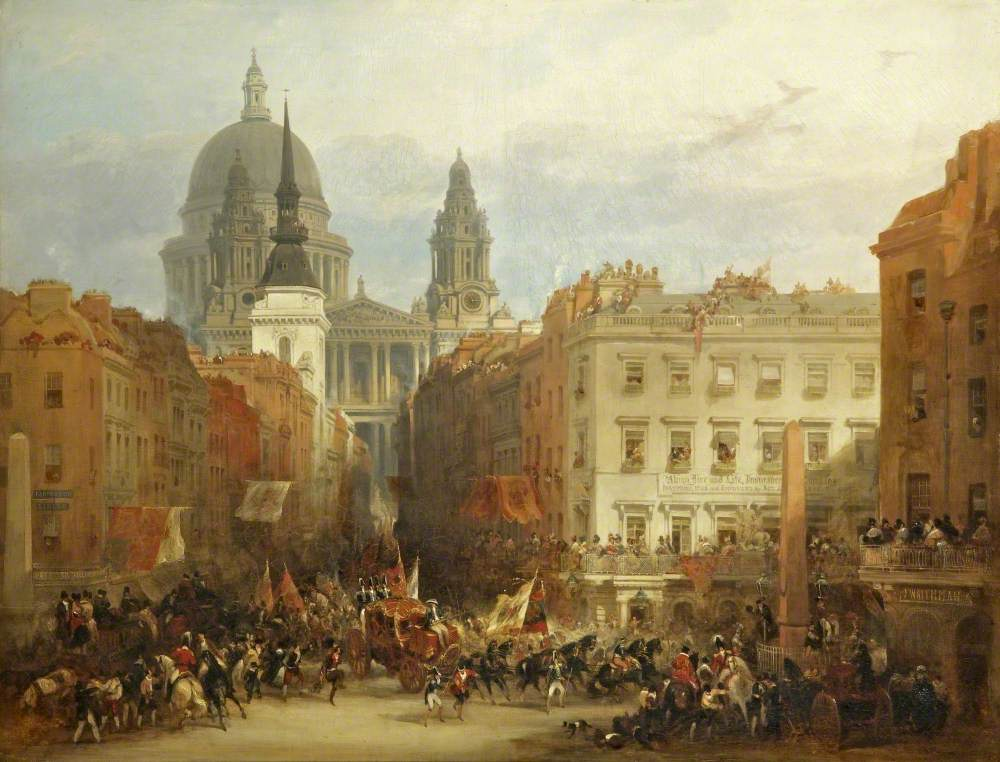
London from Fleet Street, 1837

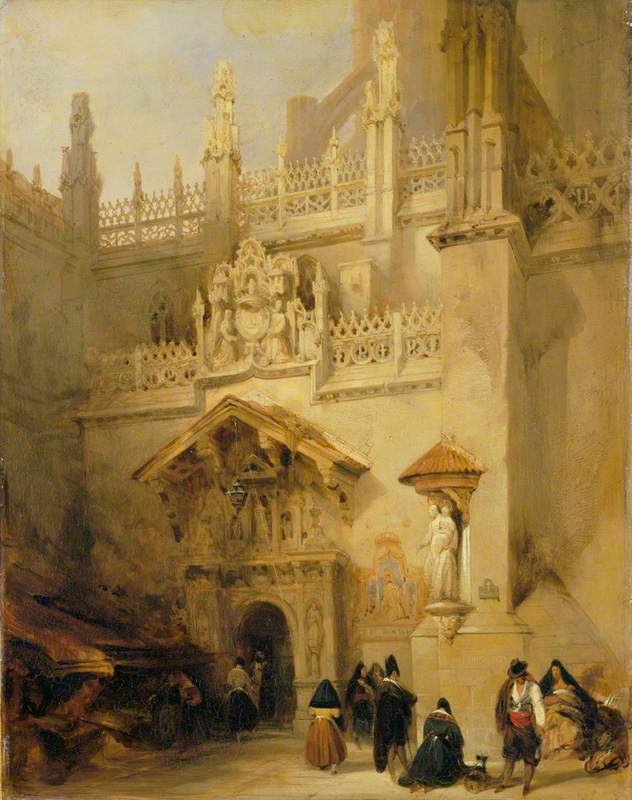
Chapel of Ferdinand and Isabella, Granada, 1838

The Ravine Leading to Petra, 1839

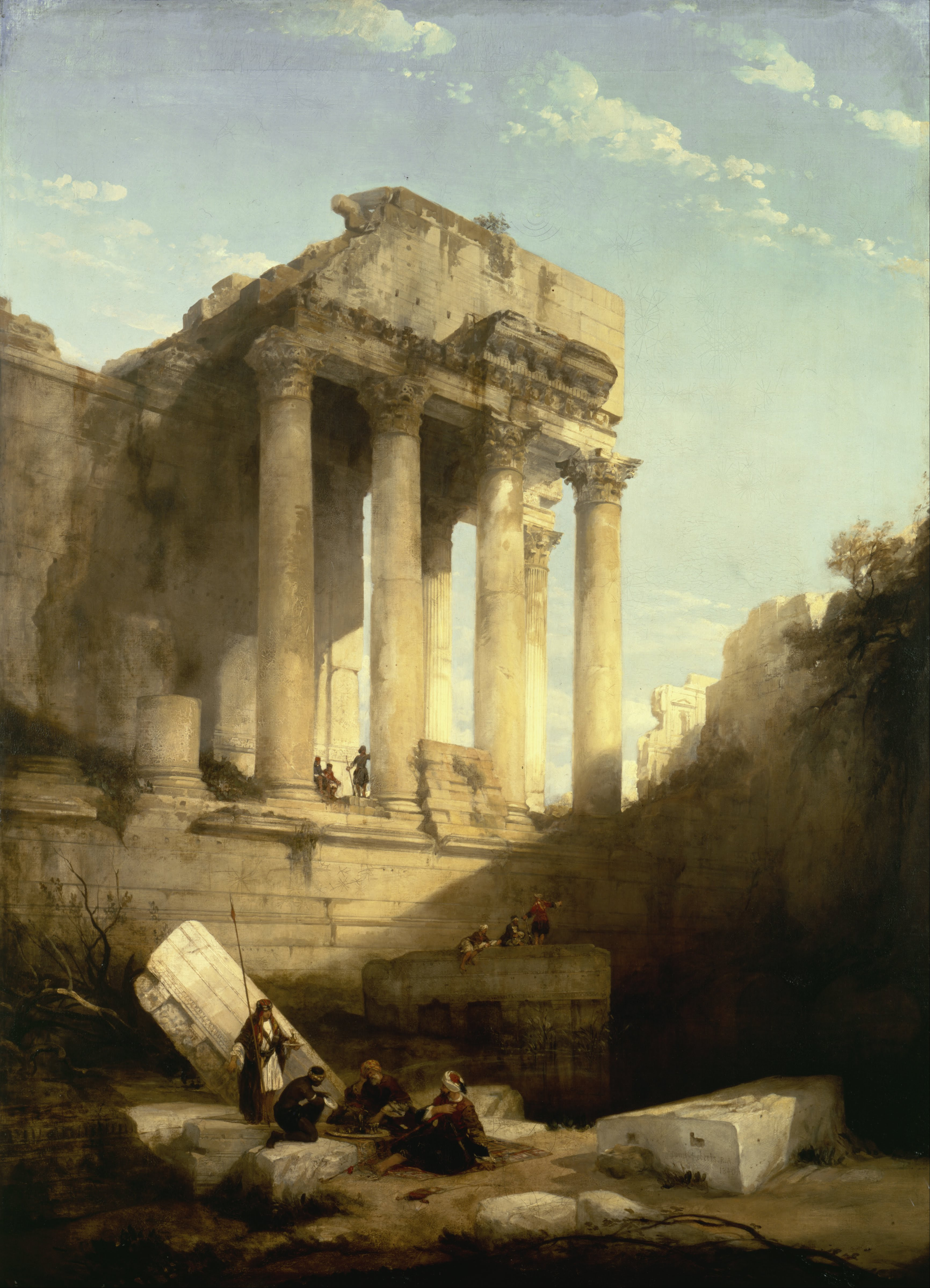
Portico of the Great Temple at Baalbec, 1840

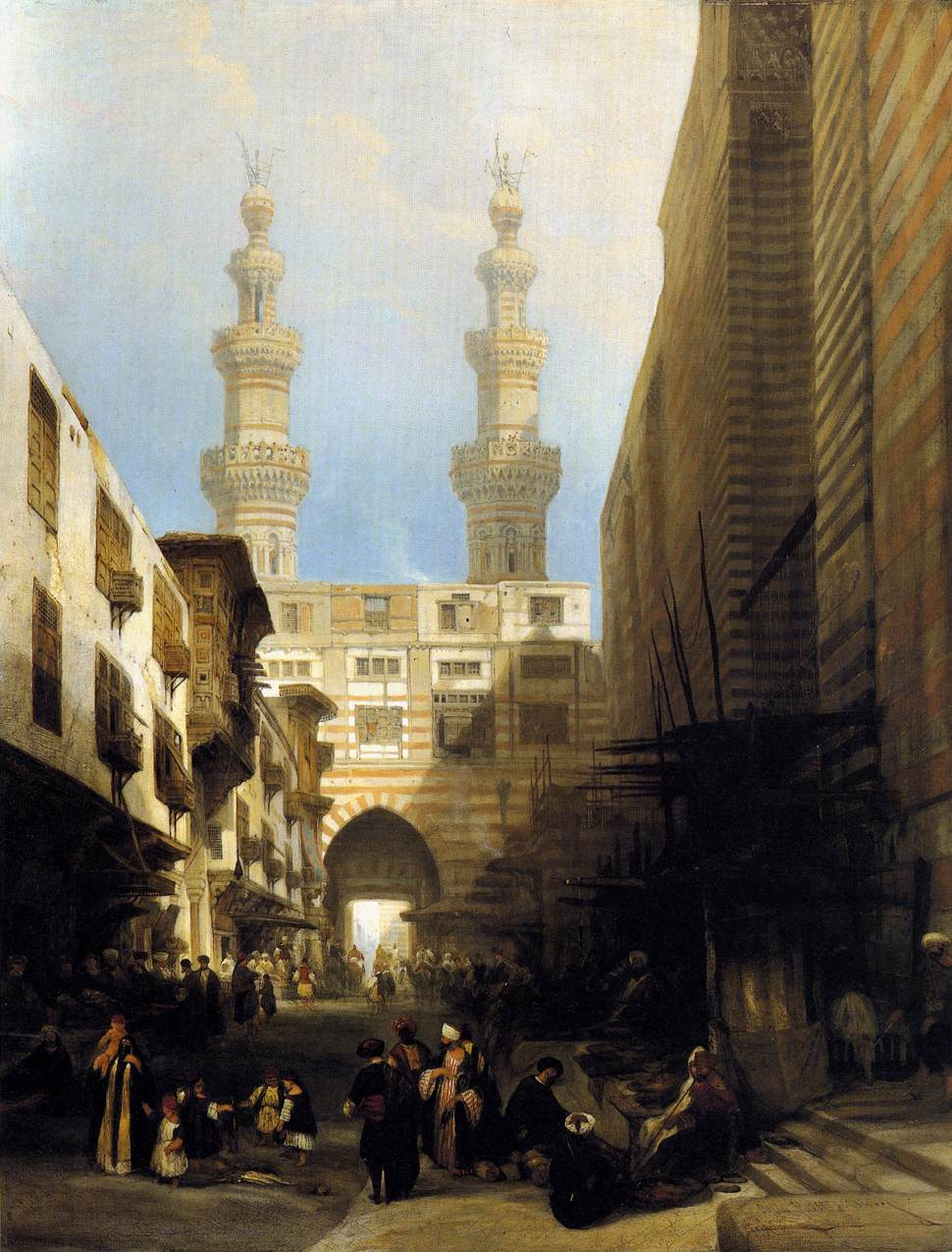
A View in Cairo, 1840

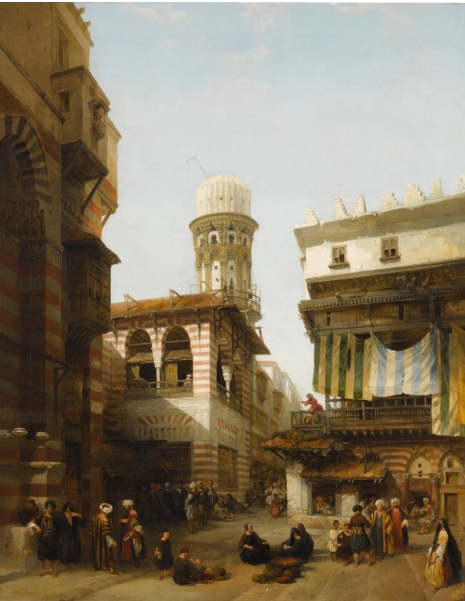
The Bazaar of the Coppersmiths, 1841

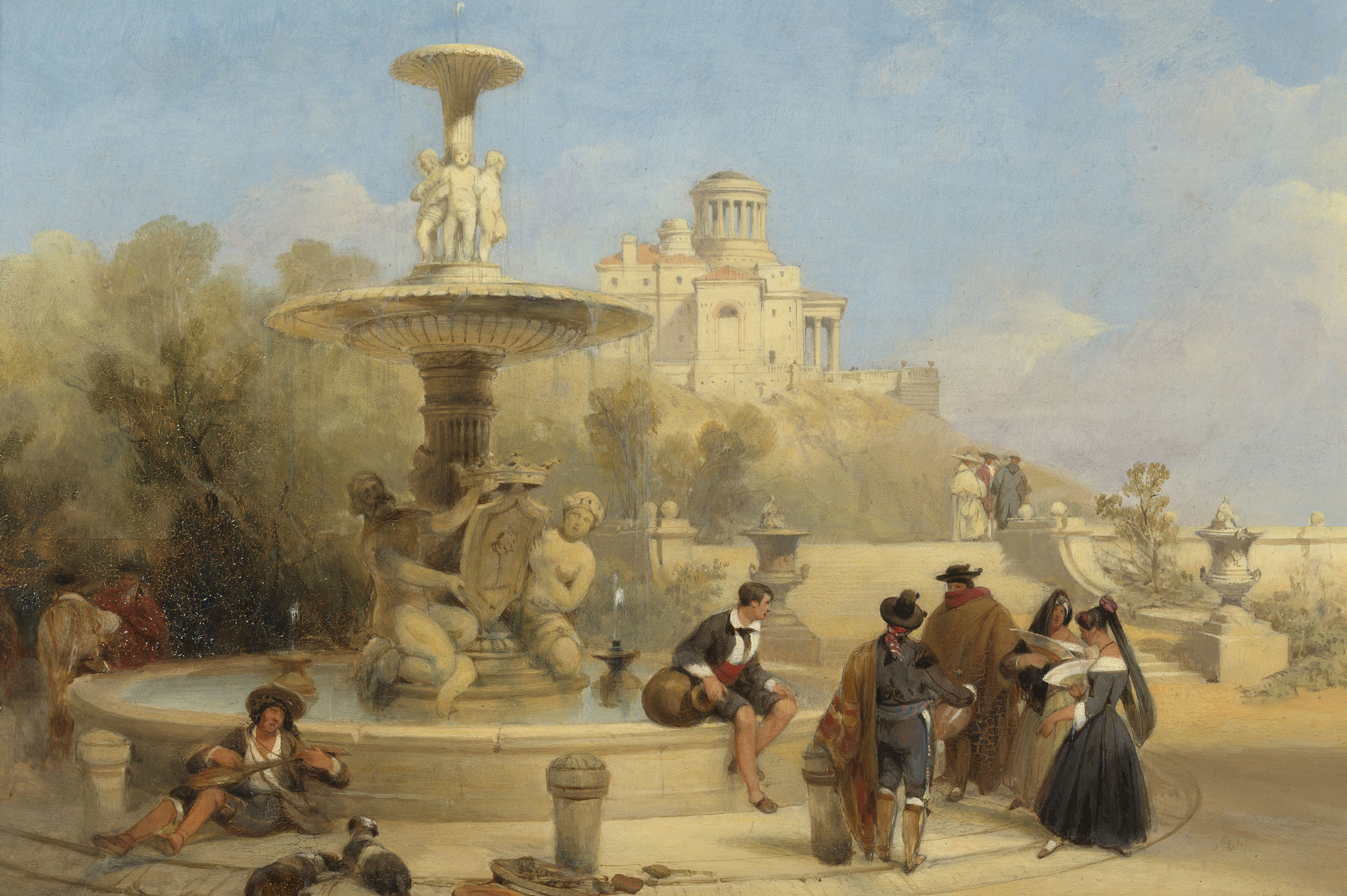
The Fountain on the Prado, Madrid, 1841

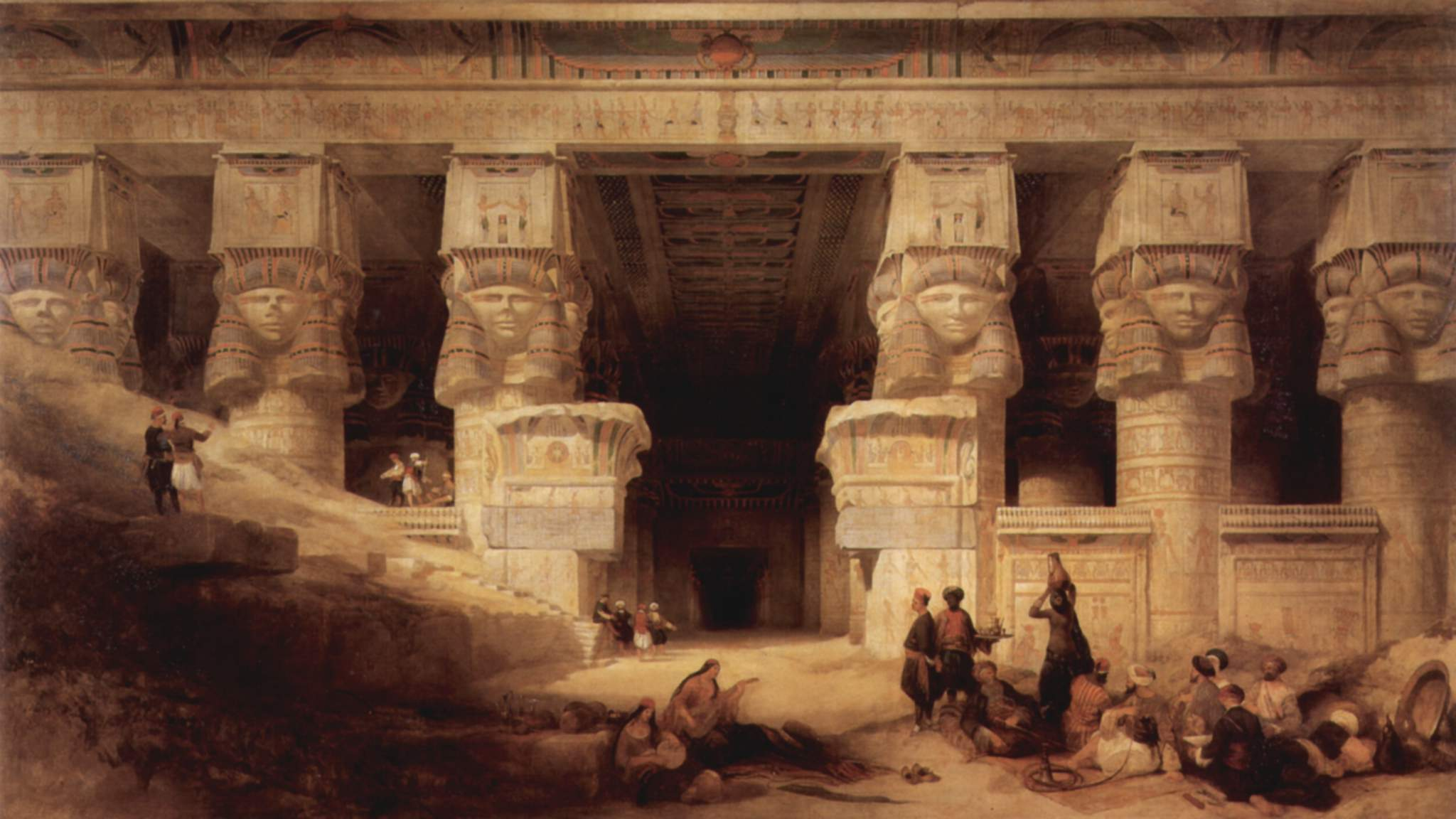
The Temple of Dendera, 1841

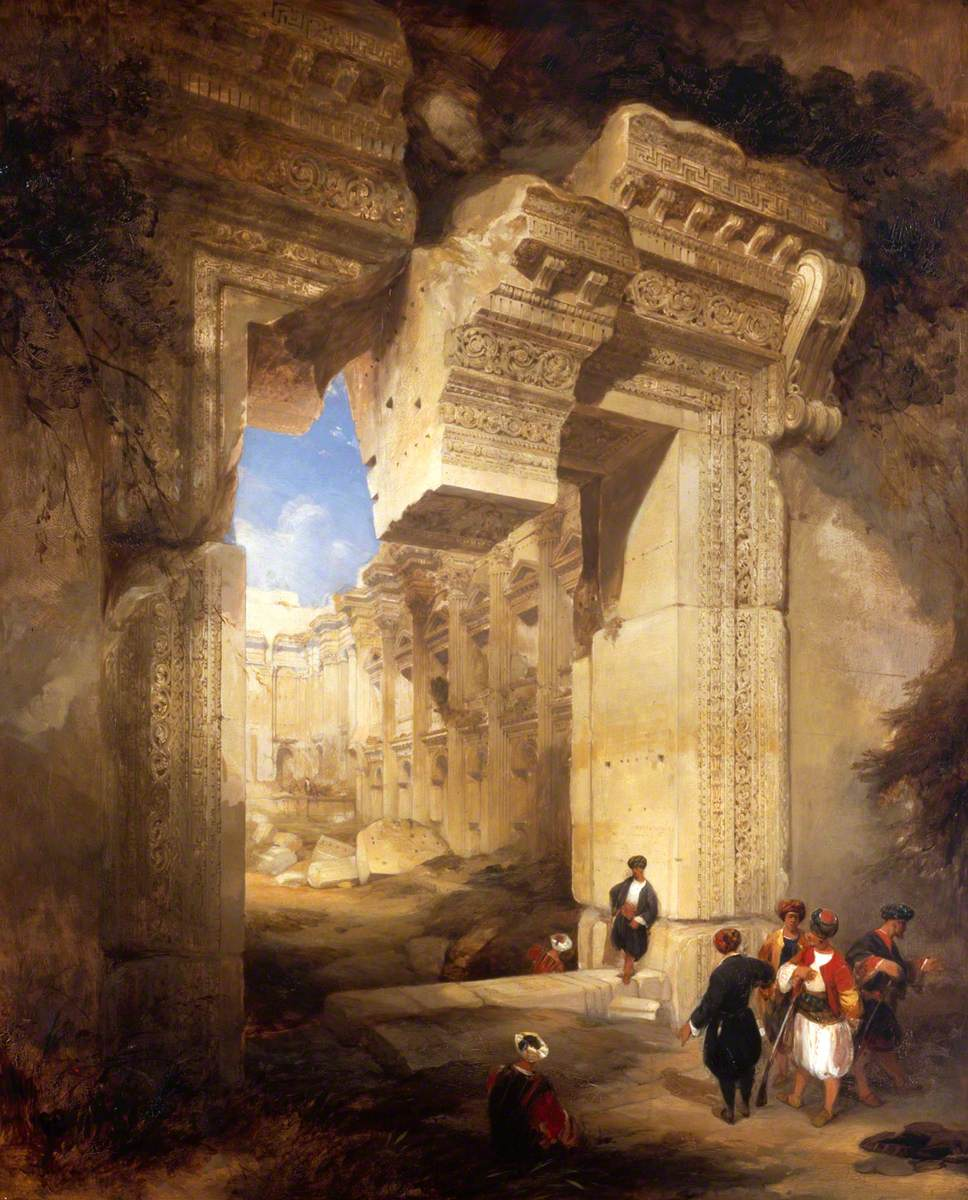
The Gateway to the Great Temple at Baalbec, 1841

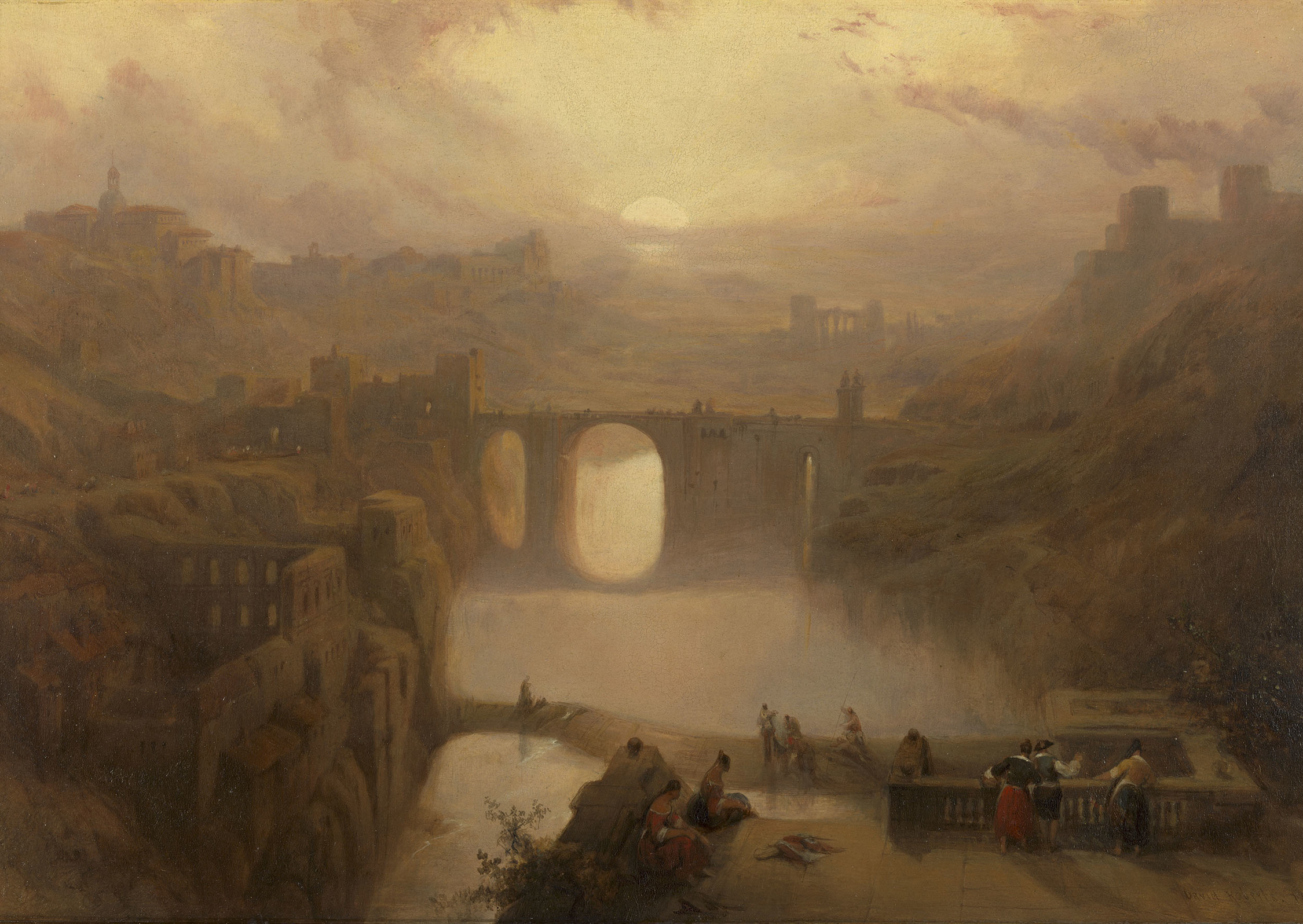
A View of Toledo and the River Tagus, 1841

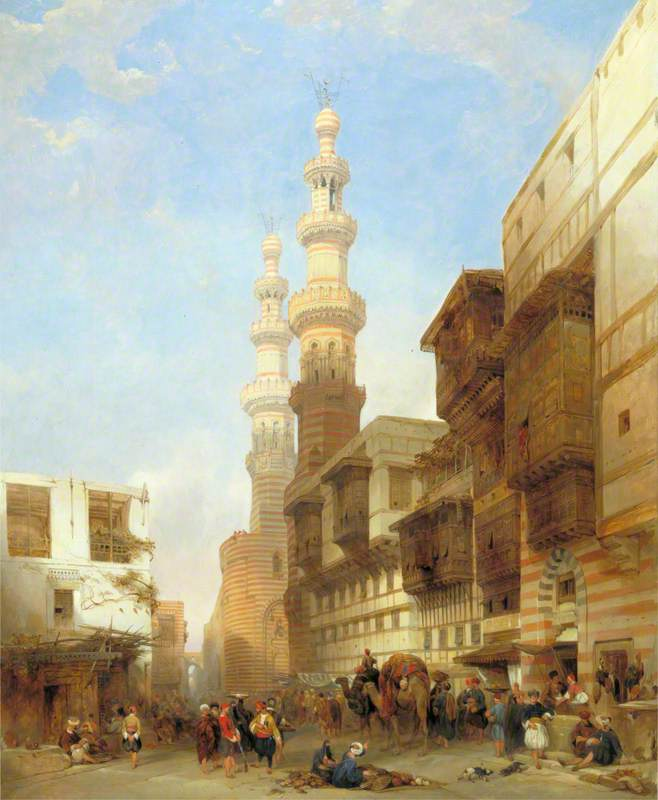
The Gate of Metawaley, 1843

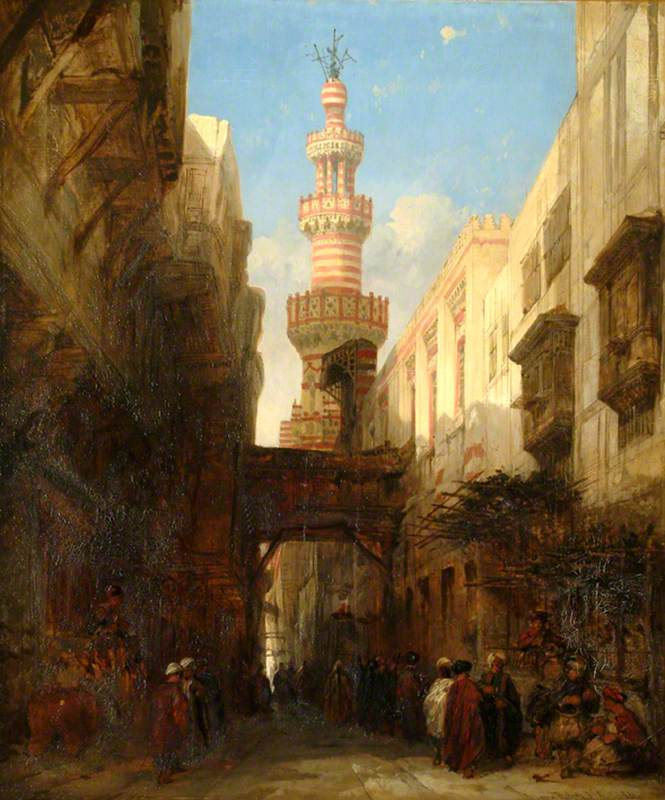
A Street in Cairo, 1846

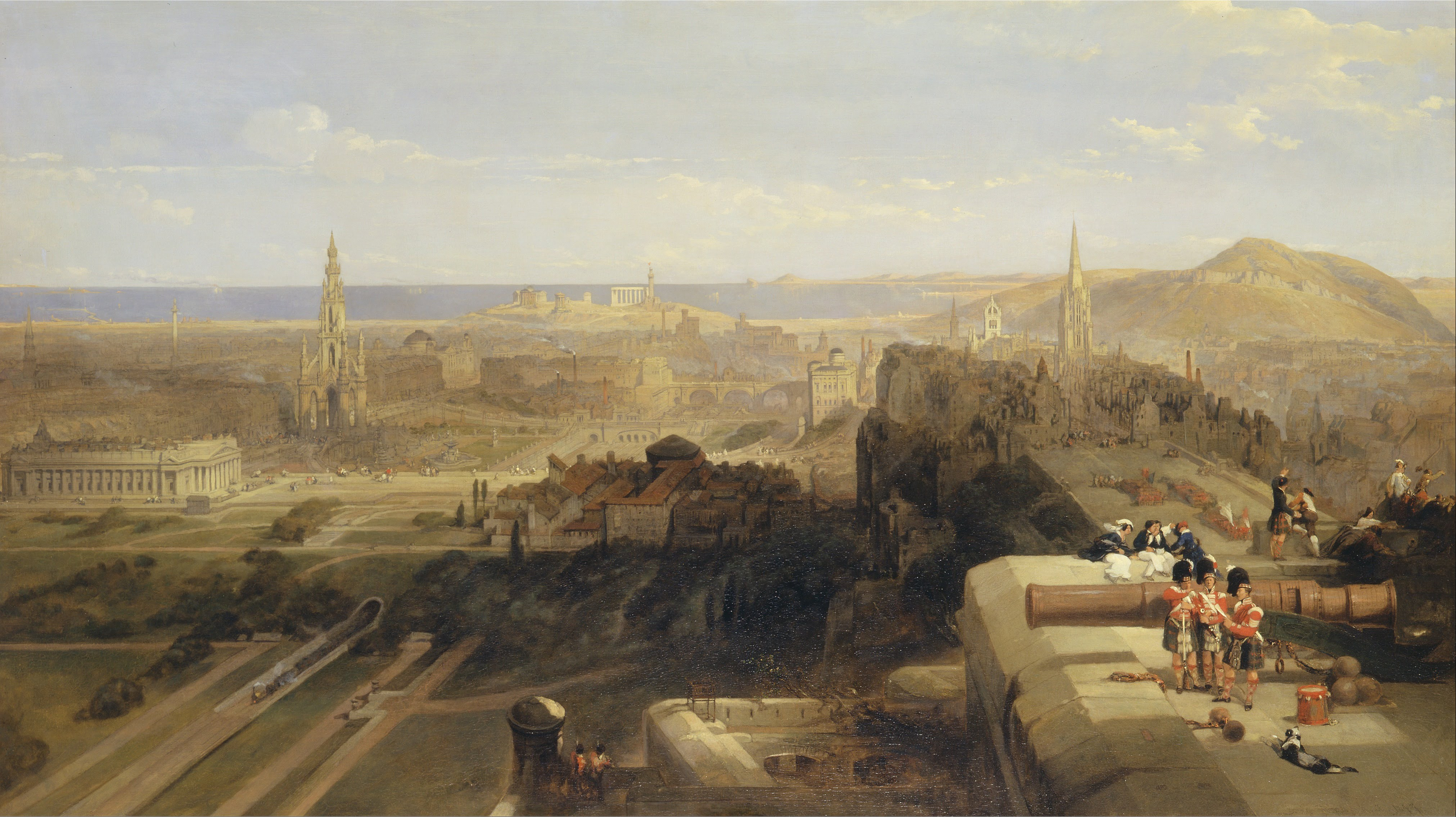
Edinburgh from the Castle, 1847

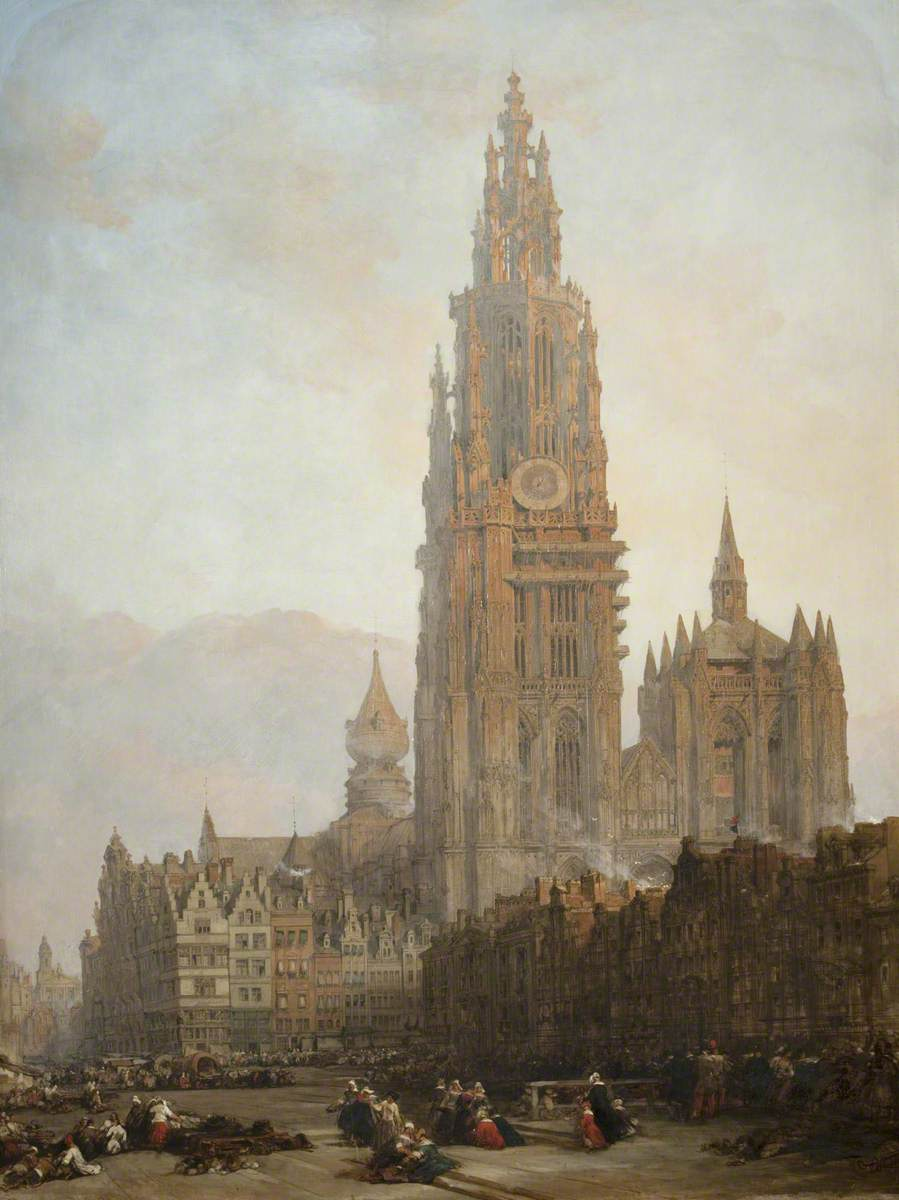
West Front of Antwerp Cathedral, 1847

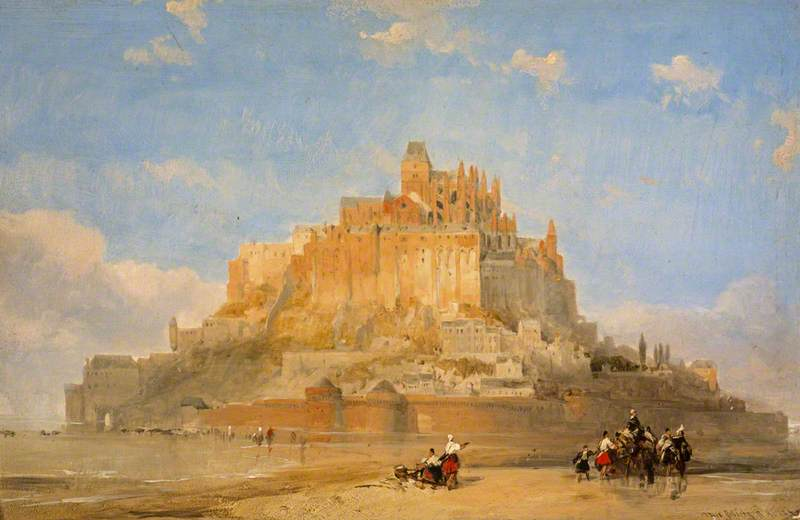
Mont Saint Michel, 1848

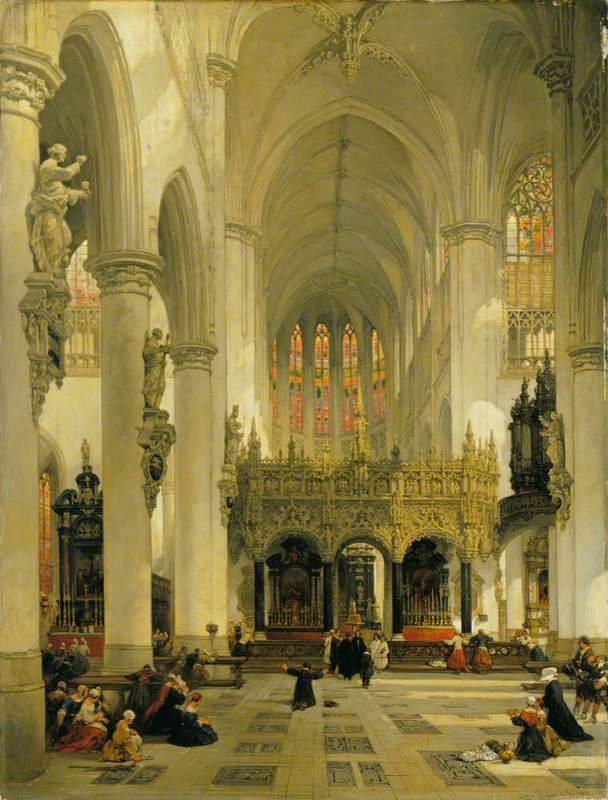
Interior of Saint-Gommaire, Lierre, 1850

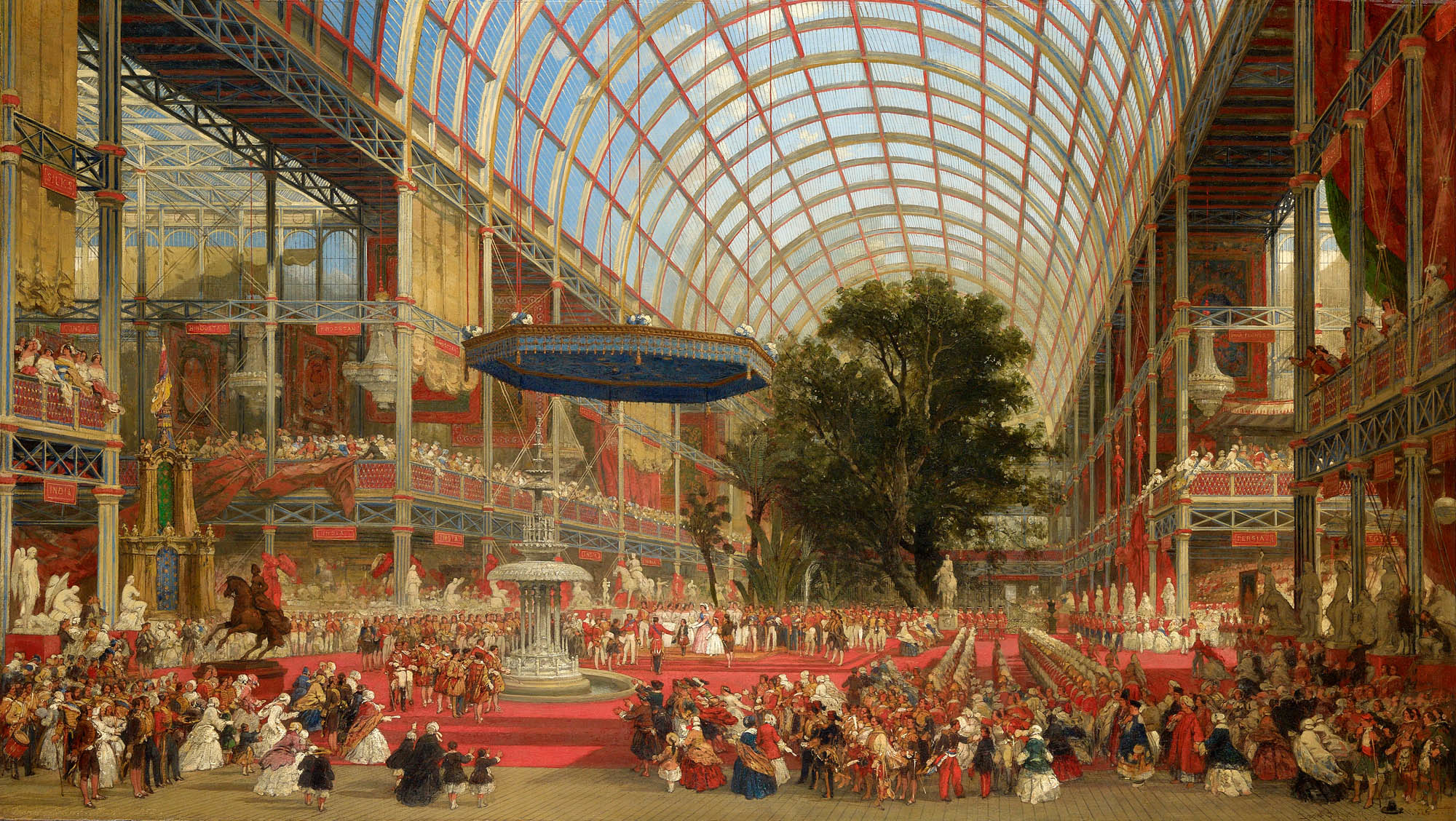
The Inauguration of the Great Exhibition, 1852

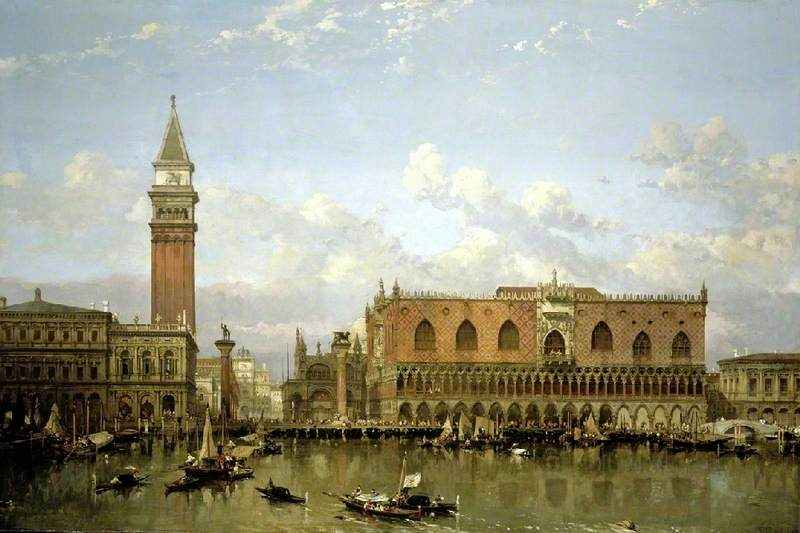
The Doge's Palace, Venice, from the Bacino di San Marco, 1853

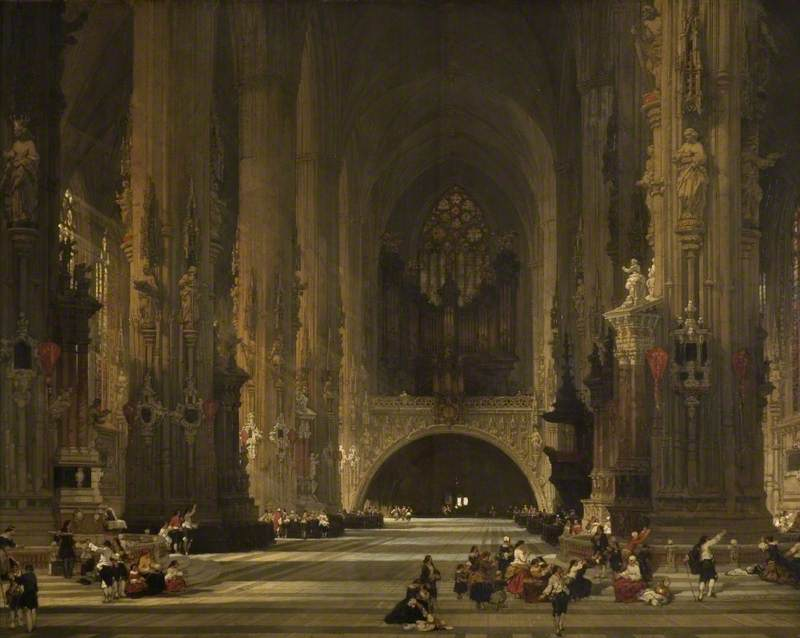
The Interior of Saint Stephen's Cathedral, Vienna, 1853

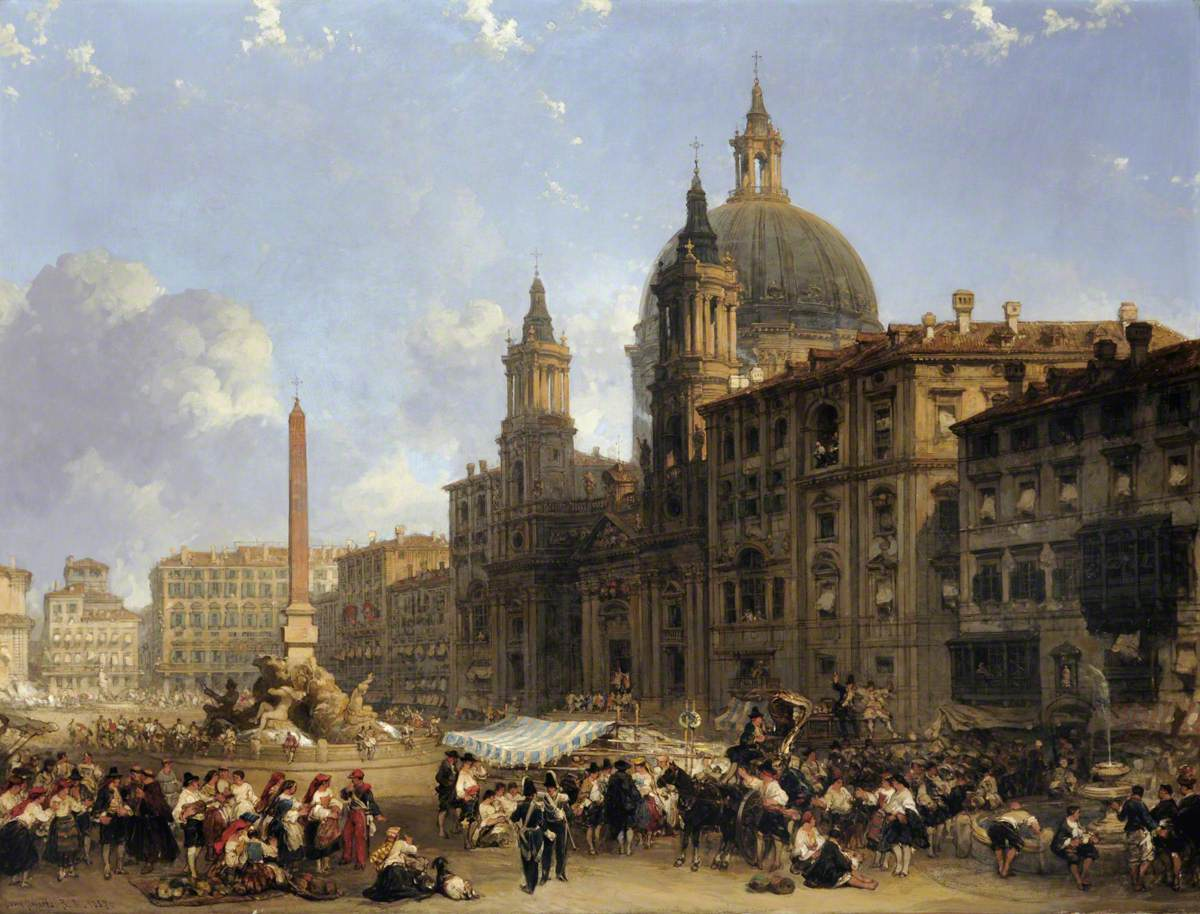
The Piazza Navona at Rome, 1857

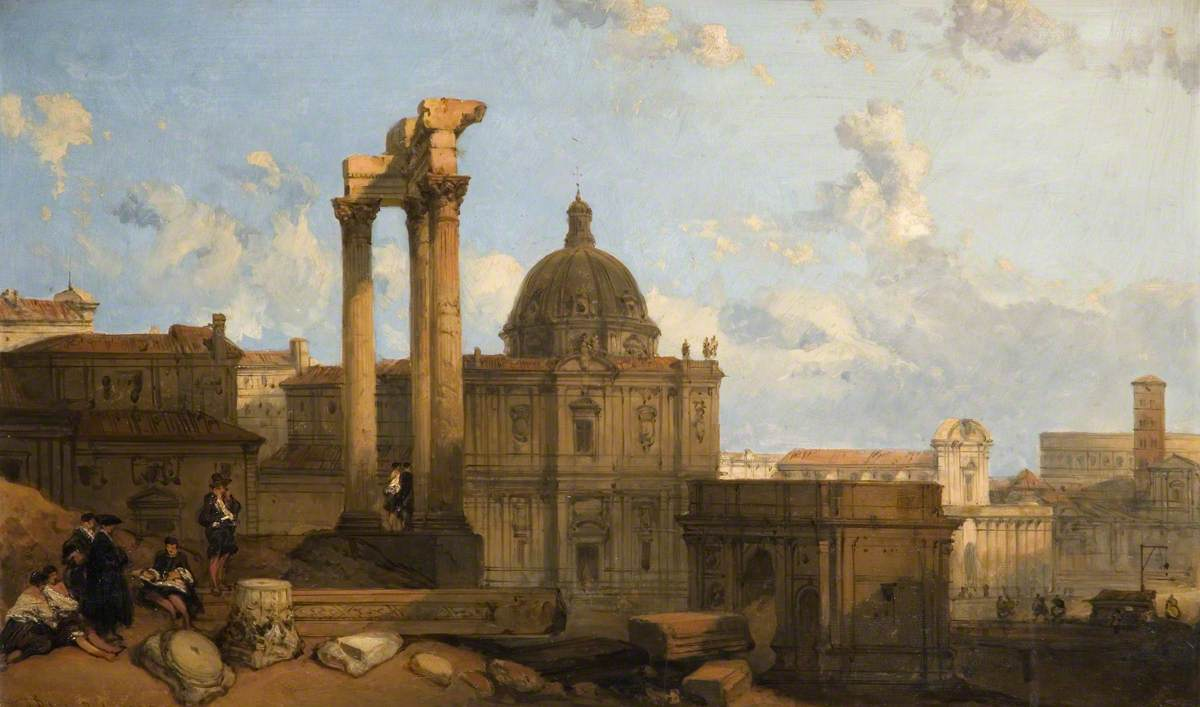
Ruins of the Roman Forum, 1859

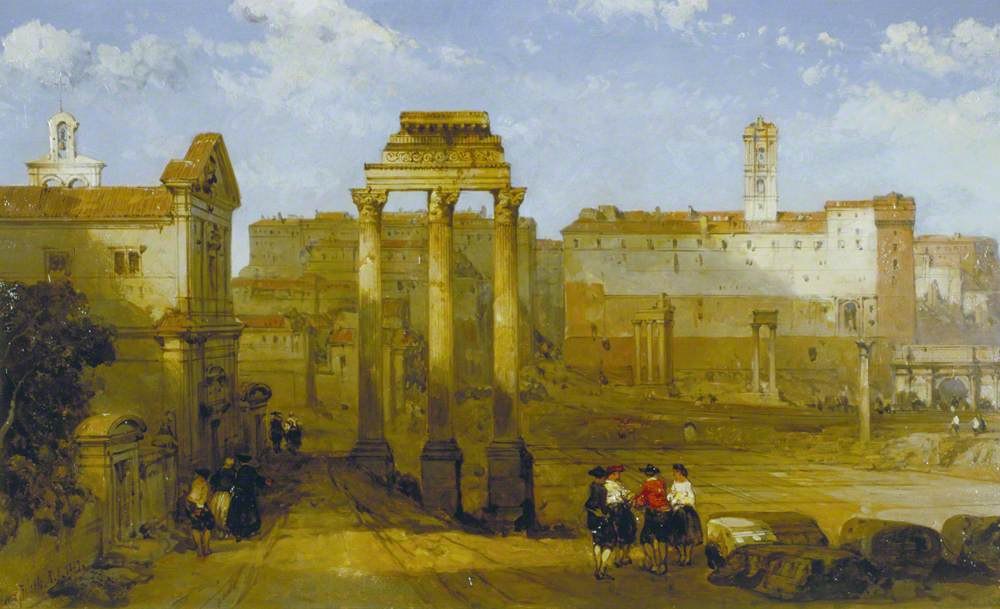
The Forum, Rome, 1859

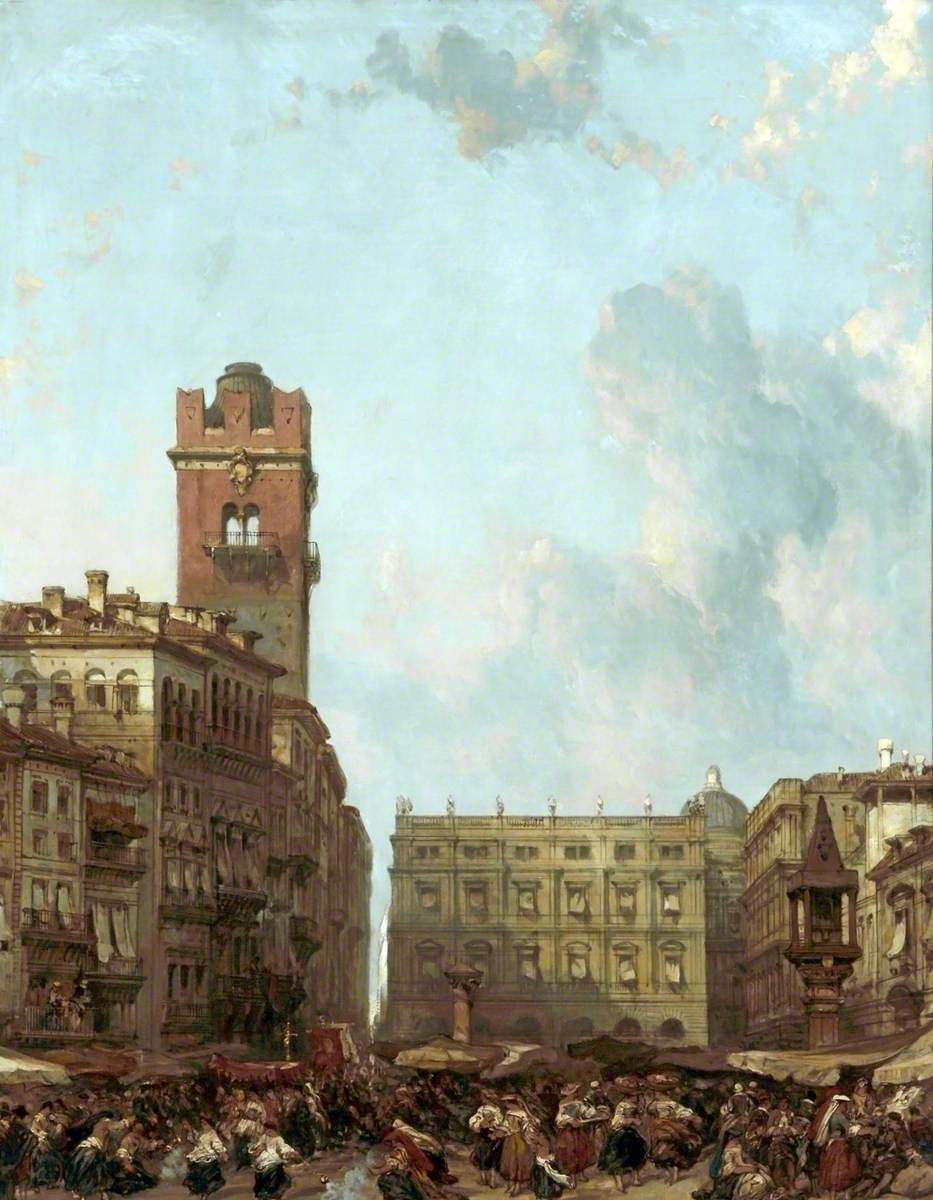
At Verona, Italy, 1859

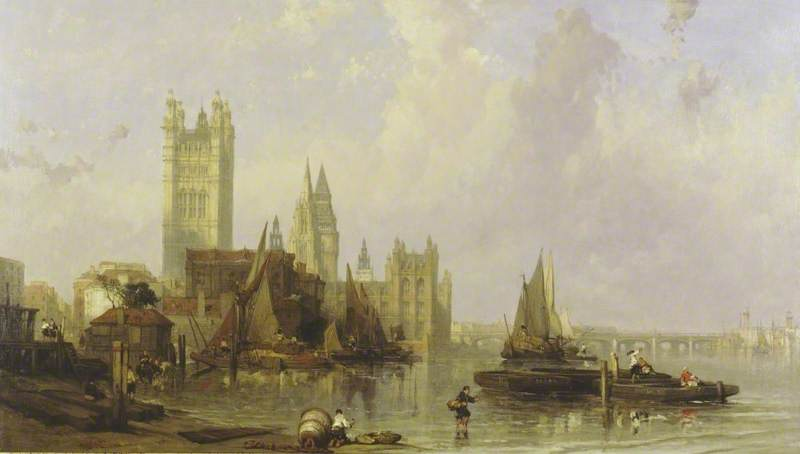
The Houses of Parliament from Millbank, 1861

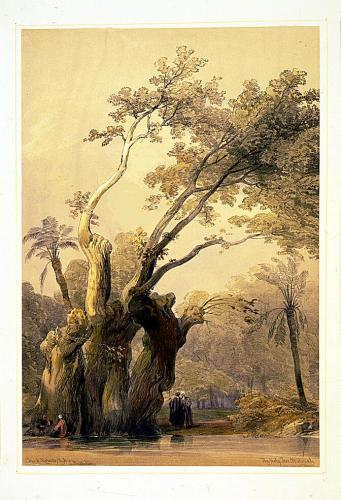
The Holy Tree, Meterea. Lithograph by Louis Haghe from an original by David Roberts

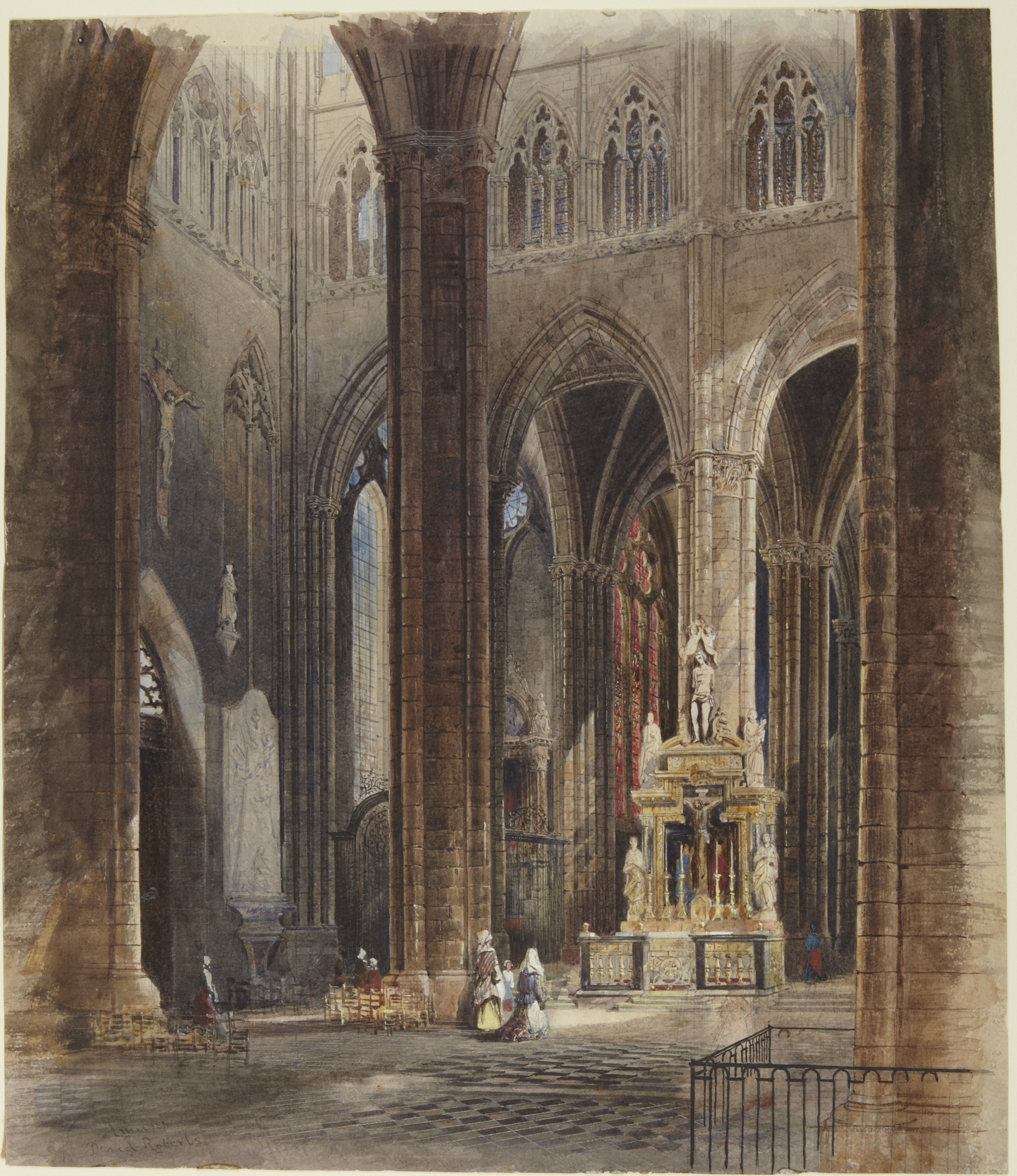
Interior of Amiens Cathedral, c. 1827. Princeton University Art Museum

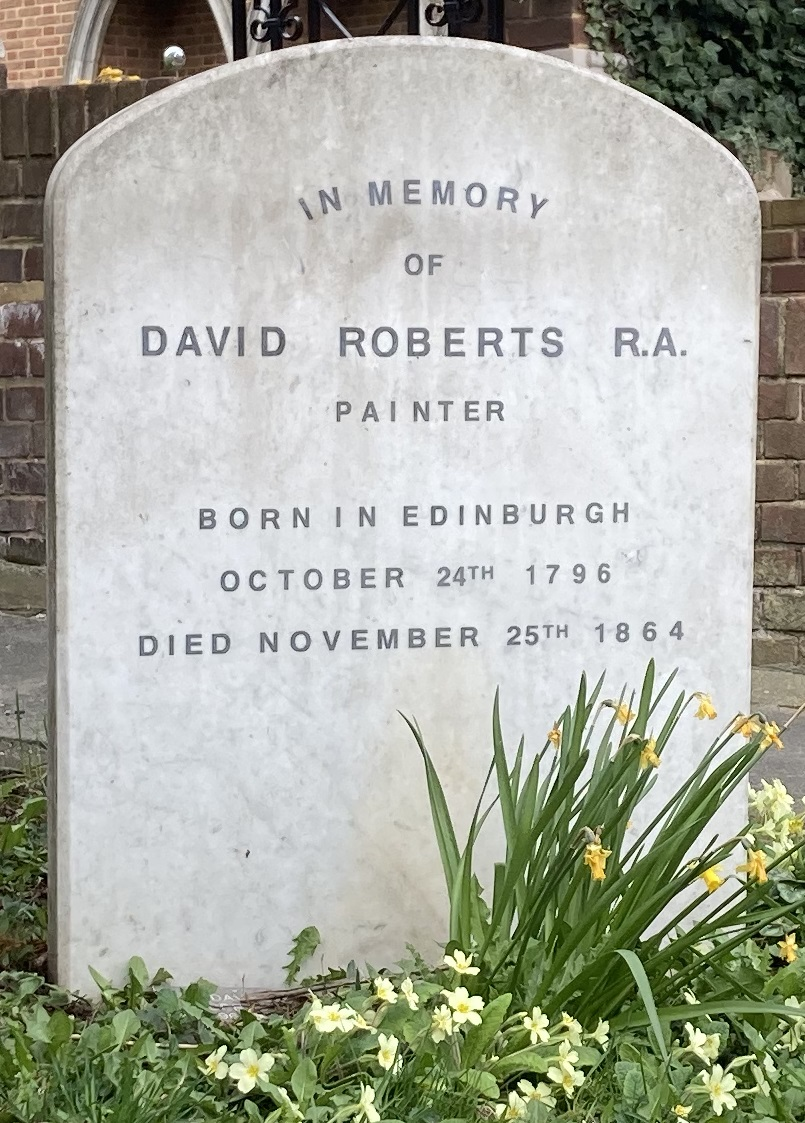
Grave of David Roberts in West Norwood Cemetery

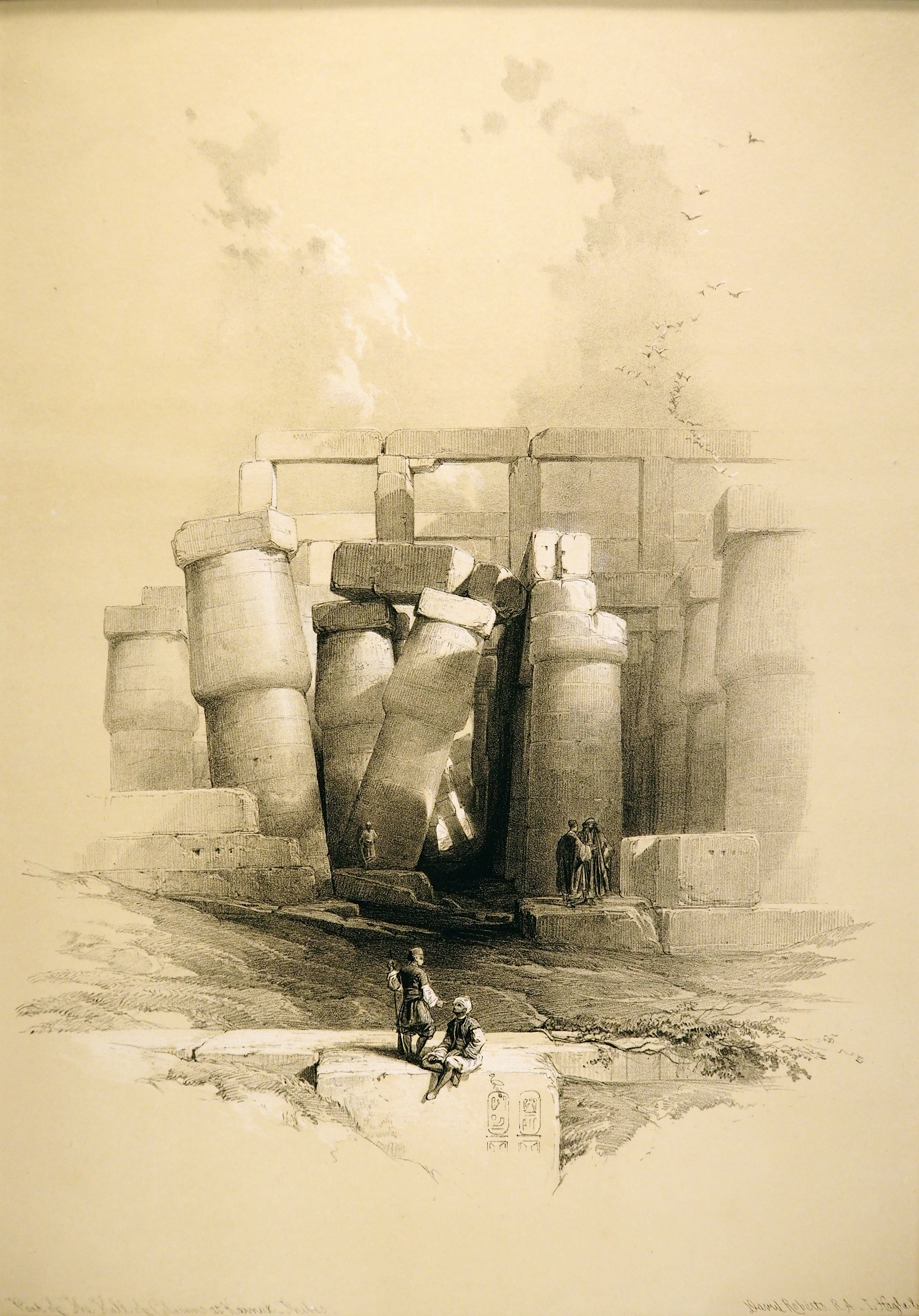
Part of the Hall of Columns at Kanak Seen from Without. Mougins Museum of Classical Art

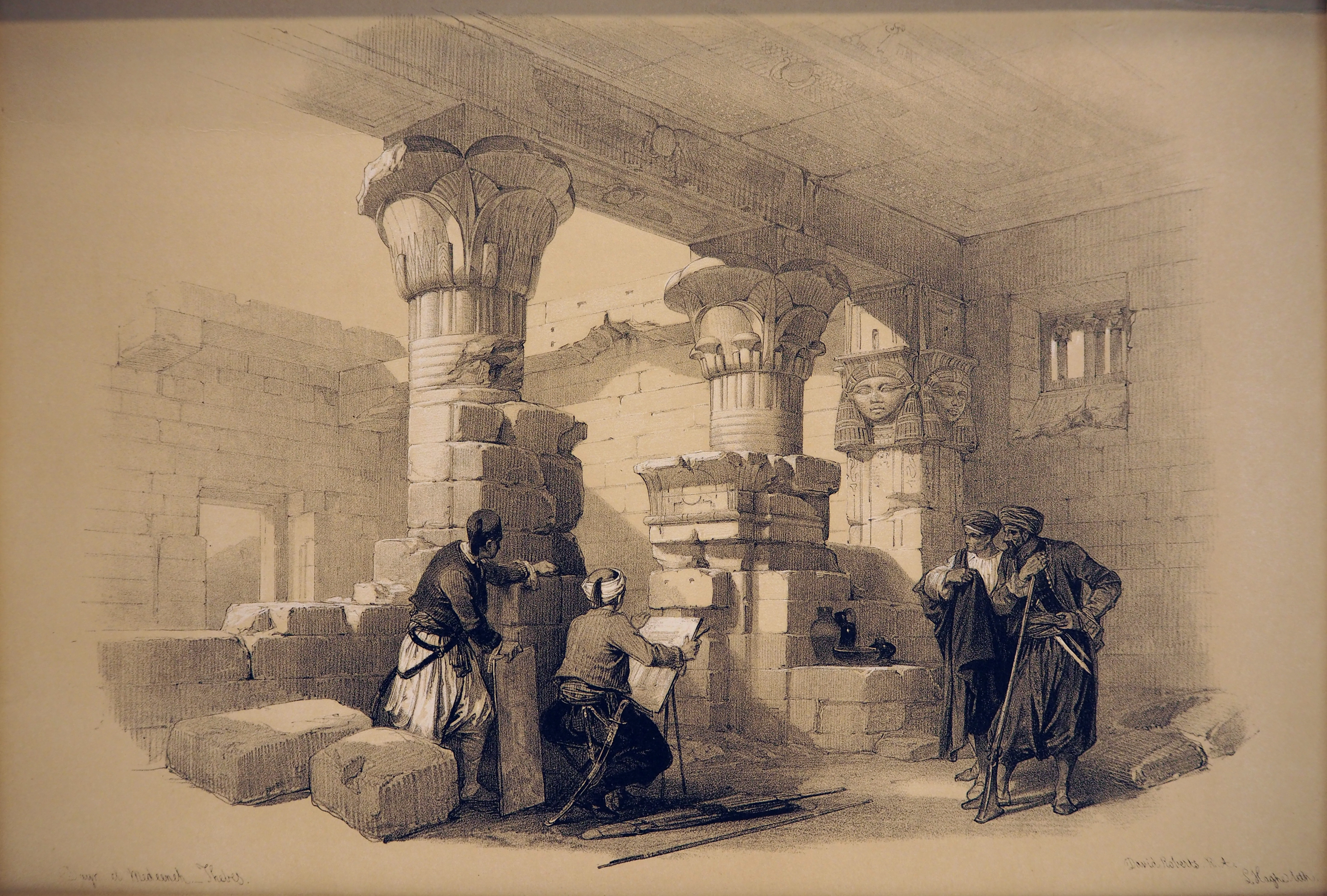
View from Under the Portico of Dayr-el-Medeeneh, Thebes. Mougins Museum of Classical Art

== See also ==
- List of Orientalist artists
- Orientalism

== Sources ==
- "Corri's New Pantheon". Caledonian Mercury. No. 14847. Edinburgh. 23 January 1817. p. 1 – via British Newspaper Archive.
- "The Pantheon is to open...". Caledonian Mercury. No. 15125. Edinburgh. 27 August 1818. p. 3 – via British Newspaper Archive.
- Ballantine, James (1866). The Life of David Roberts, R.A. Edinburgh: Adam and Charles Black. OCLC 699049826.
- Donnelly, Michael (1981), Glasgow Stained Glass: A Preliminary Study, Glasgow Museums and Art Galleries, ISBN 9780902752122
- Gilbert, W.M. (1901), Edinburgh in the Nineteenth Century, Edinburgh, p. 112
- Grant, James (1880), "VIII: Valley of the Water of Leith", Old and New Edinburgh, vol. 5, Cassell, p. 78
- Mansfield, Susan (8 July 2006), "The big draw", The Scotsman
- Matyjaszkiewicz, Krystyna (2004). "Roberts, David (1796–1864)". Oxford Dictionary of National Biography (online ed.). Oxford University Press. doi:10.1093/ref:odnb/23746. (Subscription, Wikipedia Library access or UK public library membership required.)
