= Portrait of the Duke of Portland (Grant) =

Painting by Francis Grant

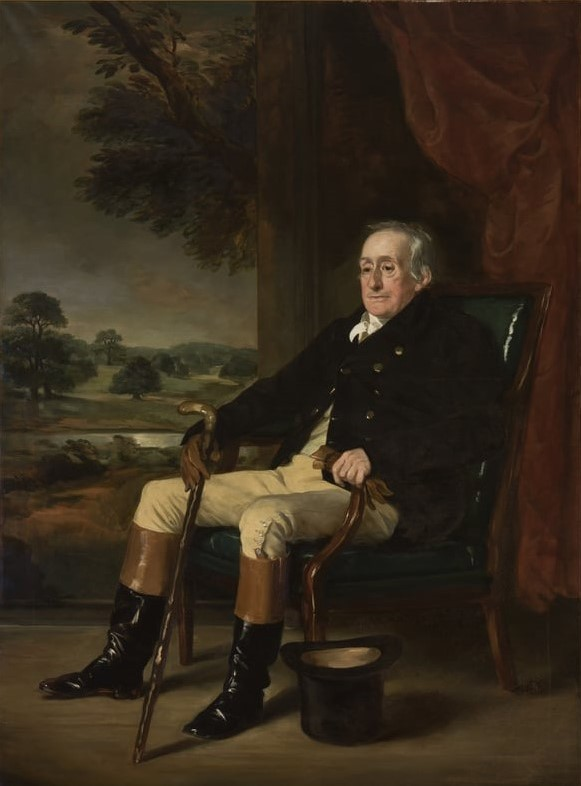
- Artist: Francis Grant
- Year: 1852
- Type: Oil on canvas, portrait painting
- Dimensions: 195.6 cm × 143.5 cm (77.0 in × 56.5 in)
- Location: Welbeck Abbey, Nottinghamshire

Portrait of the Duke of Portland is an 1852 portrait painting by the British artist Francis Grant. It depicts the English landowner and politician William Bentinck, 4th Duke of Portland. The sitter was the eldest son of the Prime Minister the Third Duke who he succeeded the title in 1809. Portland spent a great deal of time at his country estate Welbeck Abbey in The Dukeries in northern Nottinghamshire, the park of which is shown in the background. It was commissioned by eight hundred of the Duke's local tenants in appreciation of him. They requested that he be painted in the clothes he usually wore while riding around the estate. Produced for his 84th birthday he is shown as a relaxed rural gentleman with a riding crop in hand. He was particularly known for his horses and had owned the 1819 Derby winner Tiresias.

Grant was a leading portraitist of the Victorian era, following in the tradition of Thomas Lawrence. He was later elected President of the Royal Academy. The painting was displayed at the Royal Academy Exhibition of 1853 held at National Gallery in London. It remains part of the Portland Collection today. It contrasts with a portrait produced of the sitter decades before as a boy in a Van Dyke collar by Joshua Reynolds.

== Bibliography ==
- Hall, Michael. Treasures of the Portland Collection. Harley Foundation, 2016.
- Murray, Charles Fairfax. Catalogue of the Pictures Belonging to His Grace the Duke of Portland. Chiswick Press, 1894.
- Wills, Catherine. High Society: The Life and Art of Sir Francis Grant, 1803–1878. National Galleries of Scotland, 2003.
