= Interior of the Cathedral of St Stephen, Vienna =

Painting by David Roberts

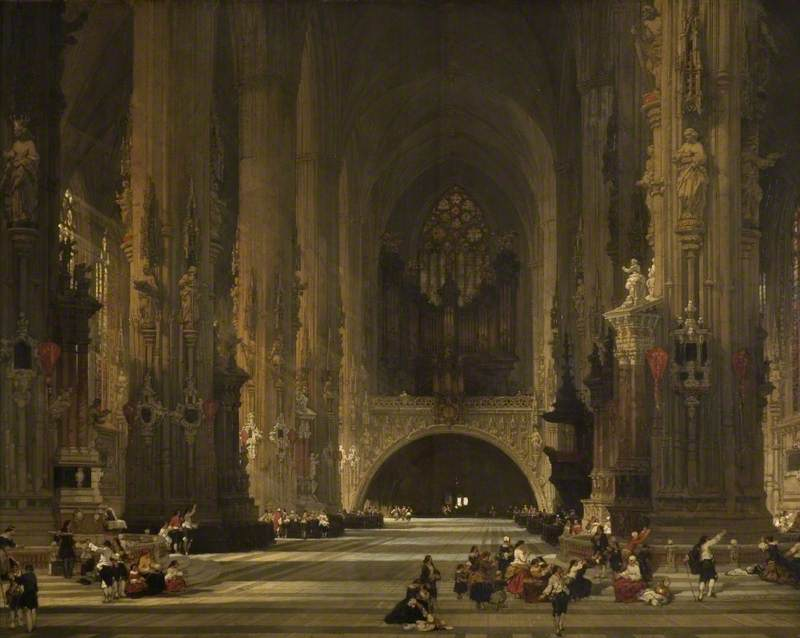
- Artist: David Roberts
- Year: 1853
- Type: Architectural painting
- Medium: Oil on canvas
- Dimensions: 111.7 cm × 143.3 cm (44.0 in × 56.4 in)
- Location: Birmingham Art Gallery, West Midlands

Interior of the Cathedral of St Stephen, Vienna is an oil painting of 1853 by the British artist David Roberts depicting a view inside the medieval St Stephen's Cathedral in Vienna. Roberts had visited Vienna in 1851 while travelling back from Venice. While he had become famous for his depictions of locations in the Middle East and Spain, he did not travel to Austria and Italy until late in his career.

The picture was displayed at the Royal Academy Exhibition of 1853 held at the National Gallery in London. It is now in the collection of Birmingham Museum and Art Gallery, which acquired it in 1937. Roberts produced several copies, including one dating from 1862 which is now in the Guildhall Art Gallery in London.

== Bibliography ==
- Ellis, Andrew & Roe, Sonia. Oil Paintings in Public Ownership in Birmingham. Public Catalogue Foundation, 2008.
- Guiterman, Helen. David Roberts, 1796–1864, Artist, Adventurer. Scottish Arts Council, 1981.
- Sim, Katherine. David Roberts R.A., 1796–1864: A Biography. Quartet Books, 1984.
