= His Last Return from Duty =

Painting by James William Glsss

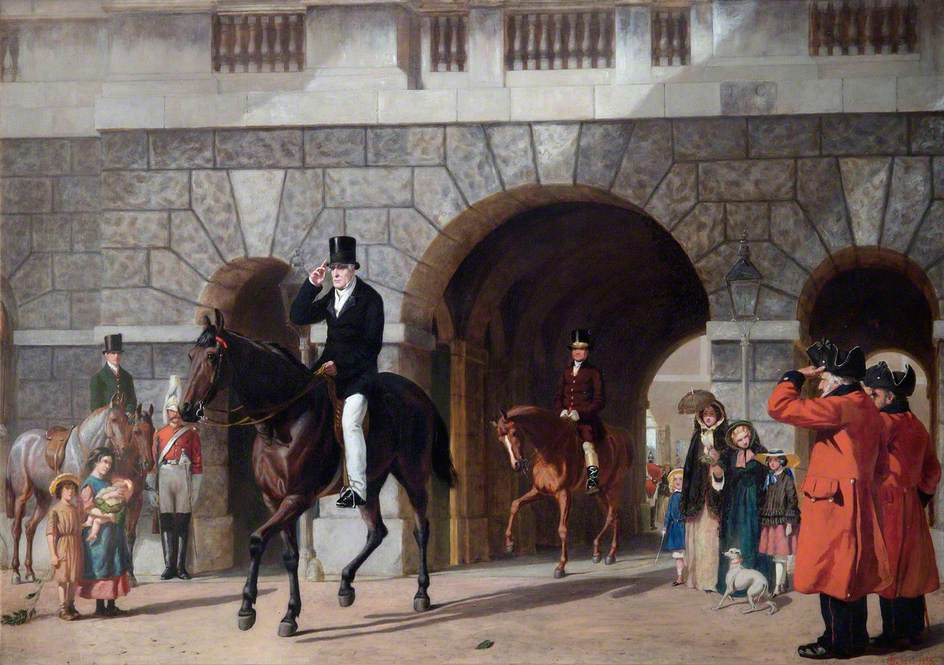
- Artist: James William Glass
- Year: 1853
- Type: Oil on canvas, history painting
- Dimensions: 81.3 cm × 123 cm (32.0 in × 48 in)
- Location: Apsley House, London

His Last Return from Duty is an 1853 history painting by the American artist James William Glass. It shows the Duke of Wellington riding out from Horse Guards for the last time as Commander in Chief. Wellington died in September 1852 before the picture was complete and had a state funeral and burial at St Paul's Cathedral on 18 November 1852.

Glass was introduced to Wellington through the American Embassy and performed several sittings in the library at Apsley House. He showed an oil sketch to the Duke who seemed pleased but remarked "you had better take your sittings now as I may not be here in the spring". Riding behind the Duke is his long-standing groom John Mears. On the right two Chelsea Pensioners salute.

The work, or an earlier version of it, was displayed at the Royal Academy Exhibition of 1853 at the National Gallery. Today the painting is part of the collection of Apsley House, the historic London residence of Wellington at Hyde Park Corner. The image became a popular one and the subject of a successful engraving.

== Bibliography ==
- Jervis, Simon & Tomlin, Maurice. Apsley House, Wellington Museum. Victoria and Albert Museum, 1997.
- Wellesley, Charles. Wellington Portrayed. Unicorn Press, 2014.
