= The Morning After Trafalgar =

Painting by Clarkson Stanfield

- Artist: Clarkson Stanfield
- Year: 1863
- Medium: Oil on canvas, landscape painting
- Dimensions: 153.2 cm × 244 cm (60.3 in × 96 in)
- Location: National Gallery of Victoria, Melbourne

The Morning after Trafalgar is an 1863 oil painting by the British artist Clarkson Stanfield. Combining elements of landscape painting and history painting, it is a seascape showing the aftermath of the Battle of Trafalgar fought in October 1805. Amidst the wreckage of the battle the painting focuses on the dismasted ship-of-the-line San Ildefonso, taken by the HMS Defence of the Royal Navy the previous day. The Union Jack is shown nailed above the Spanish naval ensign demonstrating the warship's capture during the decisive British victory the previous day.

By the time he produced the painting Stanfield was a veteran of the Romantic movement. A colleague and rival of Turner, he produced a trilogy of major works inspired by the battle including The Battle of Trafalgar (1836) and The Victory Towed into Gibraltar (1853). It was displayed at the Royal Academy Exhibition of 1863 at the National Gallery in London. It also featured at the retrospective for Stanfield held as part of the Winter Exhibition in 1870 and again at the Melbourne Centennial Exhibition in 1888. Today it is part of the collection of the National Gallery of Victoria in Melbourne, having been acquired in 1888.

== Bibliography ==
- Hoff, Ursula. European Paintings Before Eighteen Hundred. National Gallery of Victoria, 1967.
- Tracy, Nicholas. Britannia’s Palette: The Arts of Naval Victory. McGill-Queen's Press, 2007.
- Van der Merwe, Pieter & Took, Roger. The Spectacular career of Clarkson Stanfield. Tyne and Wear County Council Museums, 1979.
