= Josephine Signing the Act of Her Divorce =

Painting by Edward Matthew Ward

- Artist: Edward Matthew Ward
- Year: 1853
- Type: Oil on canvas, history painting
- Dimensions: 133.6 cm × 166.7 cm (52.6 in × 65.6 in)
- Location: National Gallery of Victoria, Melbourne

Josephine Signing the Act of Her Divorce is an oil on canvas history painting by the British artist Edward Matthew Ward, from 1853.

== History and description ==
It depicts a significant moment in French history. After deciding that he needed to remarry in order to have an heir, Napoleon compelled his first wife Joséphine to accept a divorce. This opened the way for Napoleon to Marie Louise, the daughter of the Austrian Emperor. At the Tuileries Palace on 16 December 1809 Joséphine is shown making a sorrowful sacrifice for the good of France. Napoleon is shown as a brooding figure on the left of the painting. They are surrounded by leading members of the French Imperial Court including Talleyrand.

Ward had been one of the members of The Clique and became known for his paintings of historical scenes. The painting was displayed at the Royal Academy Exhibition of 1853 held at the National Gallery in London. Thomas Babington Macaulay noted it amongst the paintings he compared favourably to the submissions of the Pre-Raphaelites. It later appeared at the 1888 Centennial Exhibition in Melbourne when it was purchased for the city's National Gallery of Victoria.

== See also ==
- The Divorce of the Empress Josephine by Henri Frédéric Schopin, an 1846 painting

== Bibliography ==
- Dafforne, James. The Life and Works of Edward Matthew Ward. Virtue and Company, 1879.
- Thomas, William. The Journals of Thomas Babington Macaulay: Volume 4. Taylor & Francis, 2024.
