= Royal Academy Exhibition of 1853 =

1853 art exhibition in London

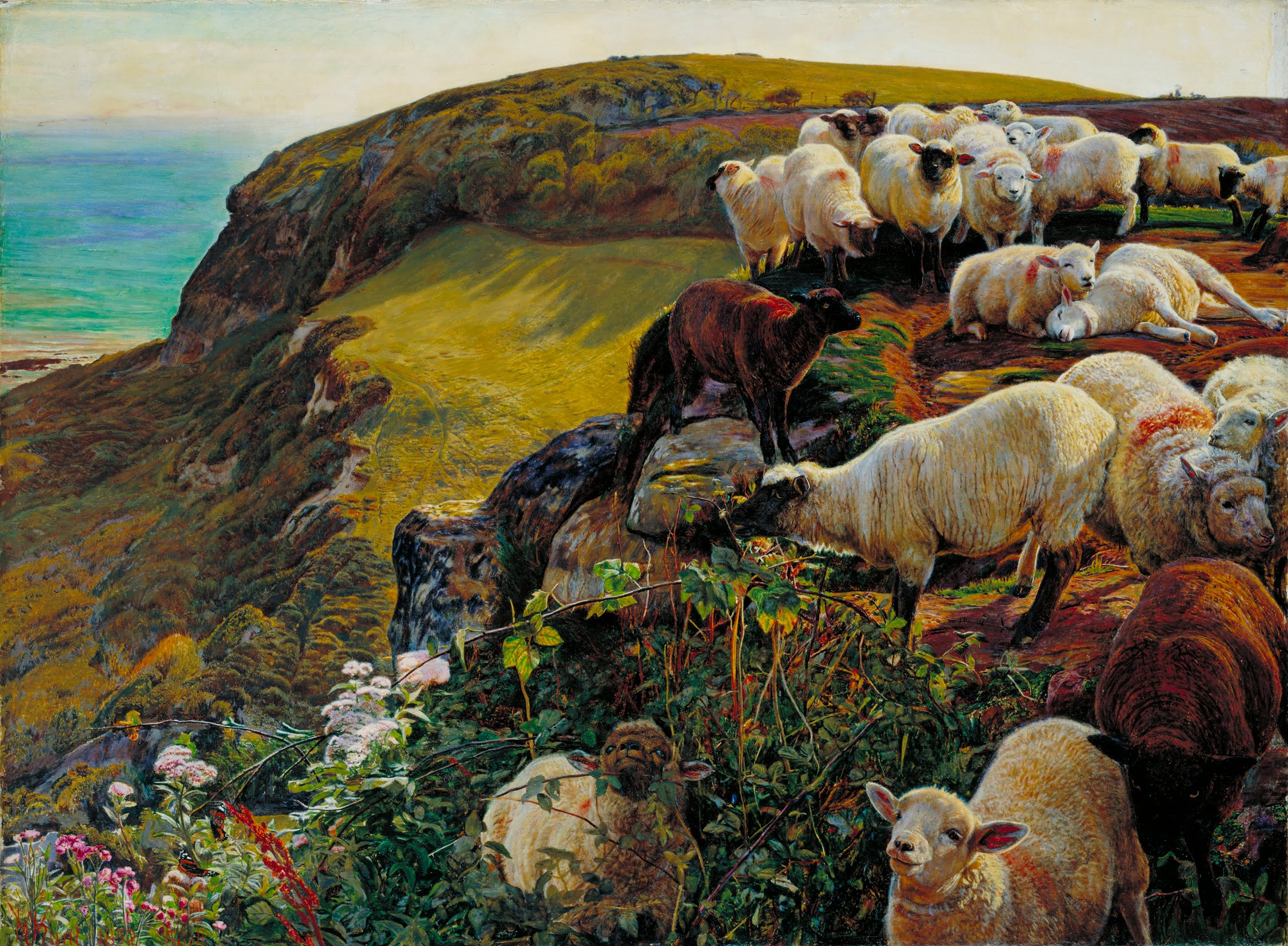
Our English Coasts by William Holman Hunt

The Royal Academy Exhibition of 1853 was the eighty fifth annual Summer Exhibition of the British Royal Academy of Arts. It was held at the National Gallery on Trafalgar Square in London between 2 May and 23 July 1853.

The exhibition further cemented the presence of the Pre-Raphaelite Brotherhood as a major force in British art. William Holman Hunt's Our English Coasts, depicting a group of sheep on a clifftop, had taken him six months painting En plein air to complete. He also displayed Claudio and Isabella, inspired by William Shakespeare's play Measure for Measure. Meanwhile John Everett Millais presented two history paintings The Proscribed Royalist, inspired by the War of the Three Kingdoms as The Order of Release, featuring a scene from the aftermath of the 1745 Jacobite Rebellion.

Amongst veteran artists who has established their reputations in the pre-Victorian era Edwin Landseer submitted several works. Clarkson Stanfield exhibited his maritime painting The Victory Towed into Gibraltar set during the Napoleonic Wars. The Scottish artist David Roberts's The Inauguration of the Great Exhibition commemorated Queen Victoria's opening of the Crystal Palace two years earlier. Several paintings commemorated the Duke of Wellington who had died the previous year, while Stephen Pearce painted The Arctic Council Planning a Search for Sir John Franklin.

== Gallery ==
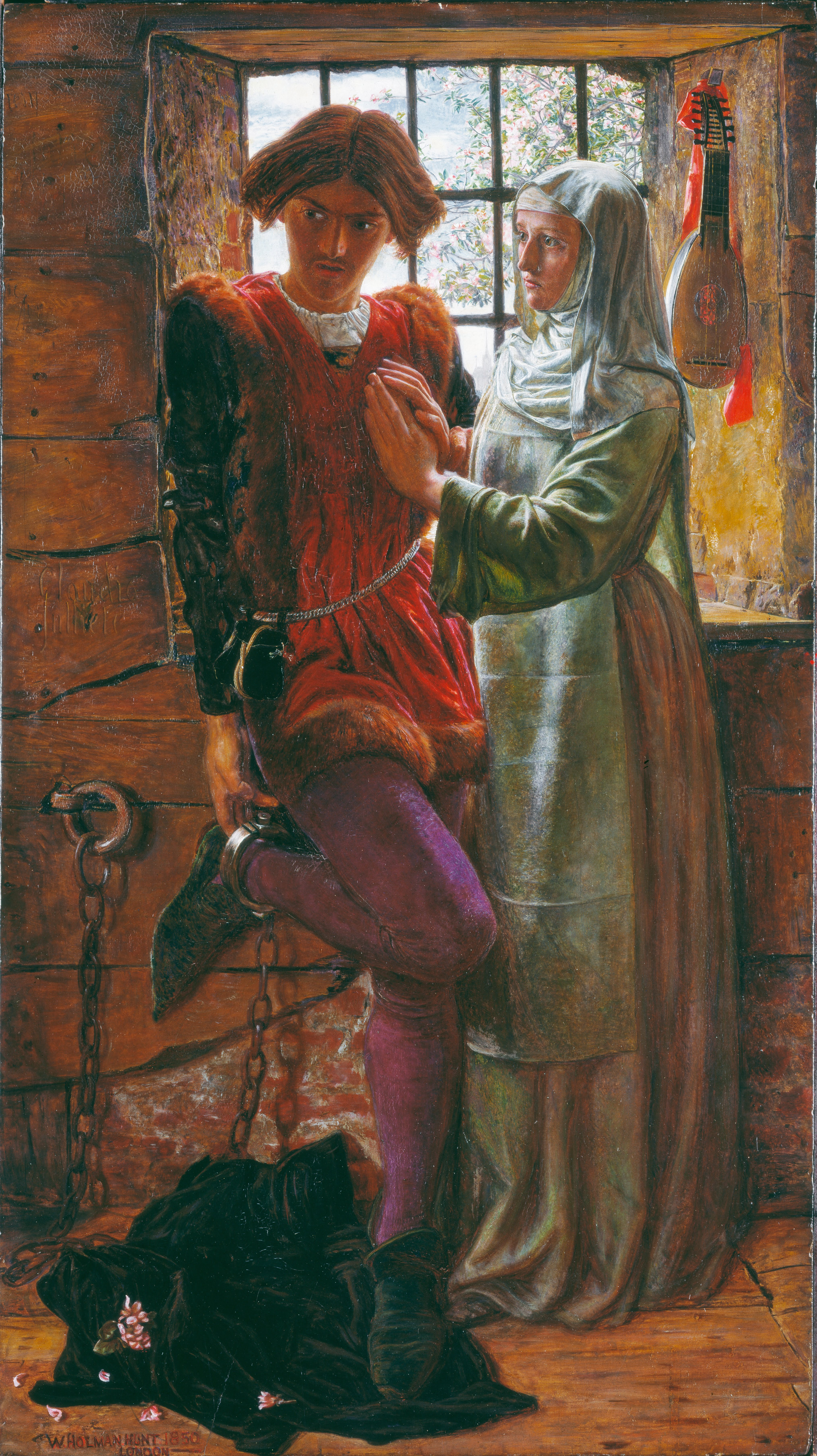
Claudio and Isabella by William Holman Hunt

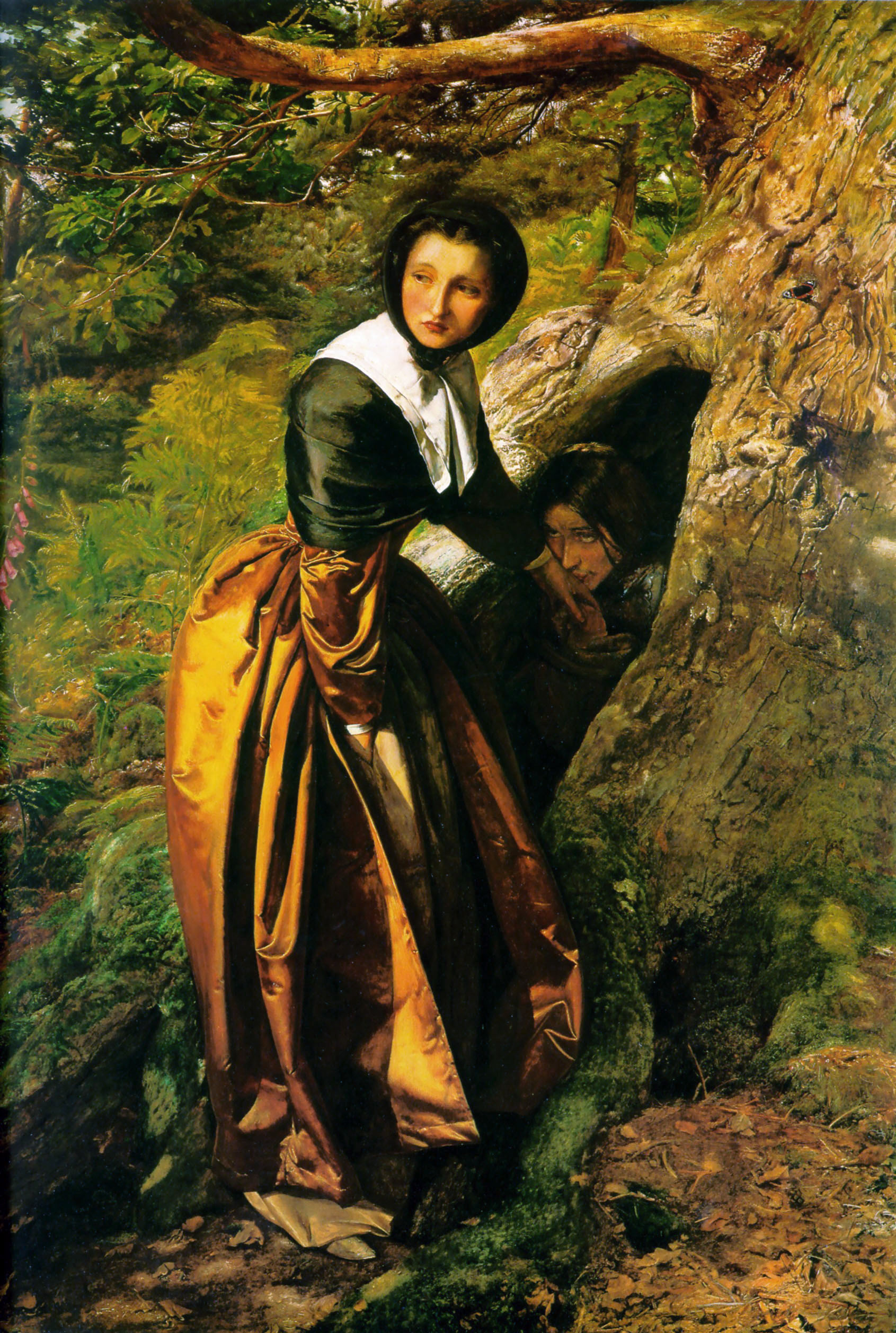
The Proscribed Royalist, 1651 by John Everett Millais

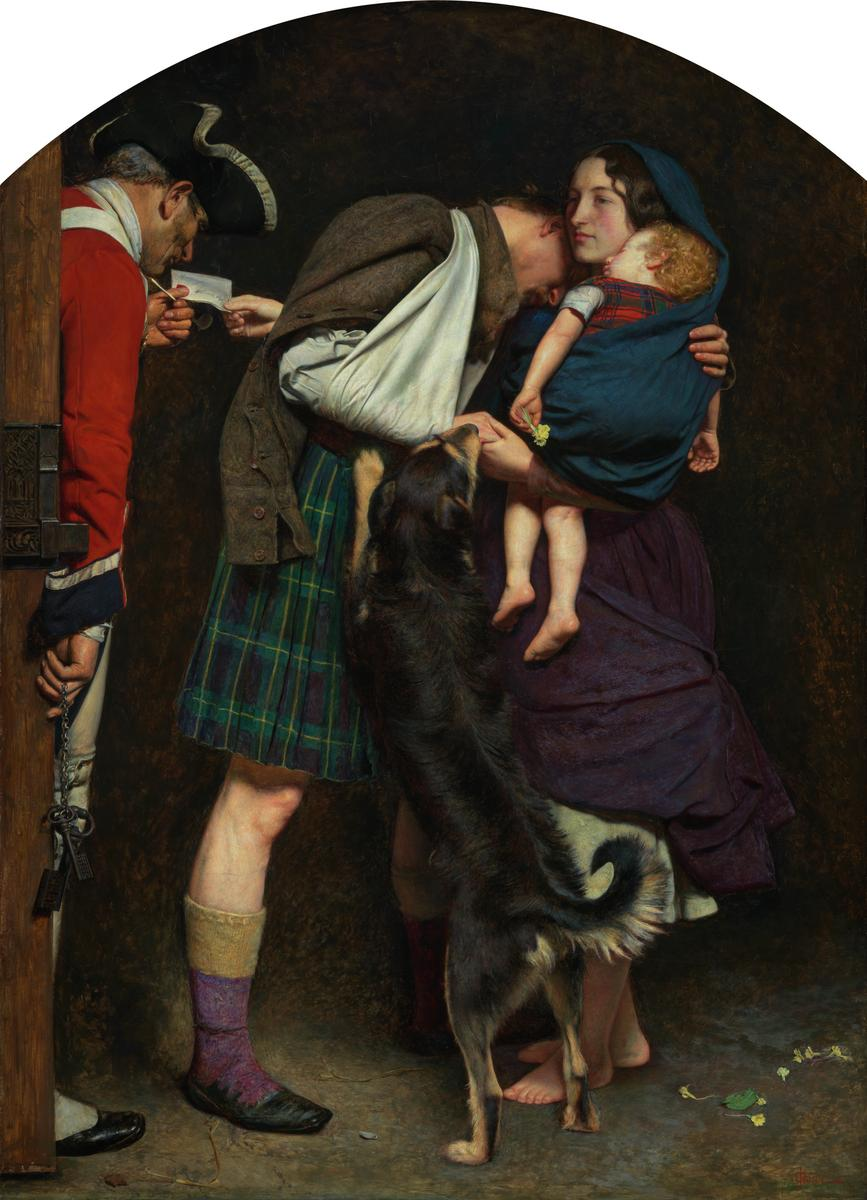
The Order of Release, 1746 by John Everett Millais

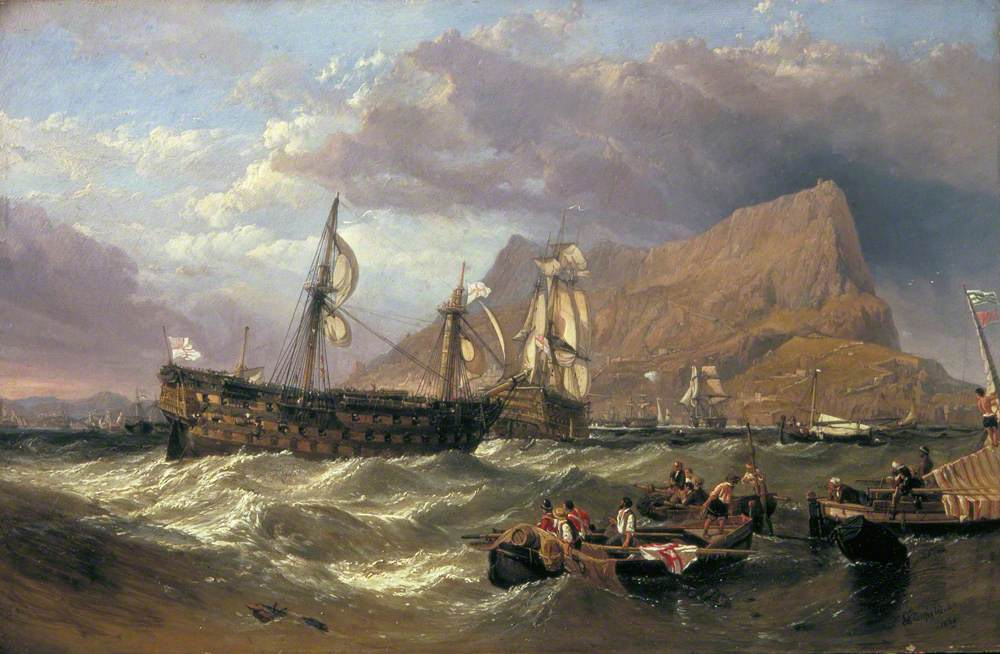
The Victory Towed into Gibraltar by Clarkson Stanfield

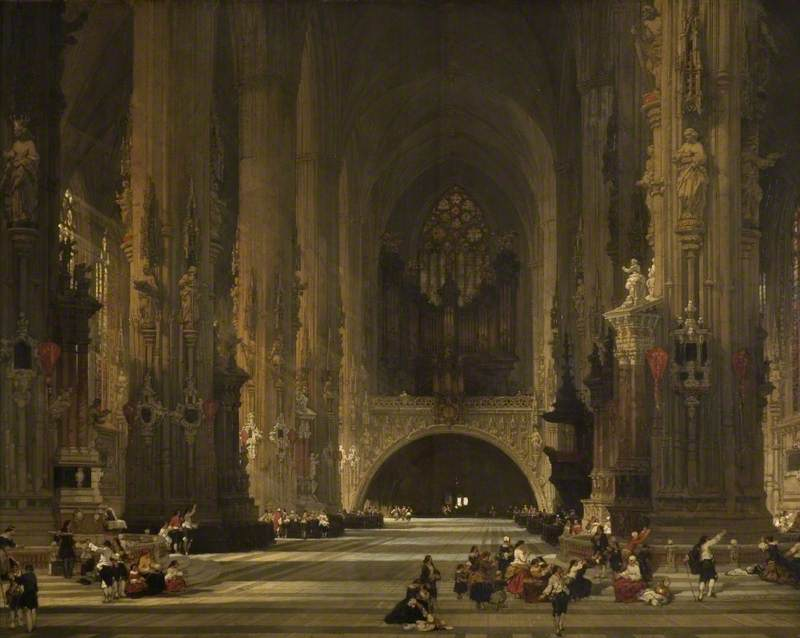
The Interior of Saint Stephen's Cathedral, Vienna by David Roberts

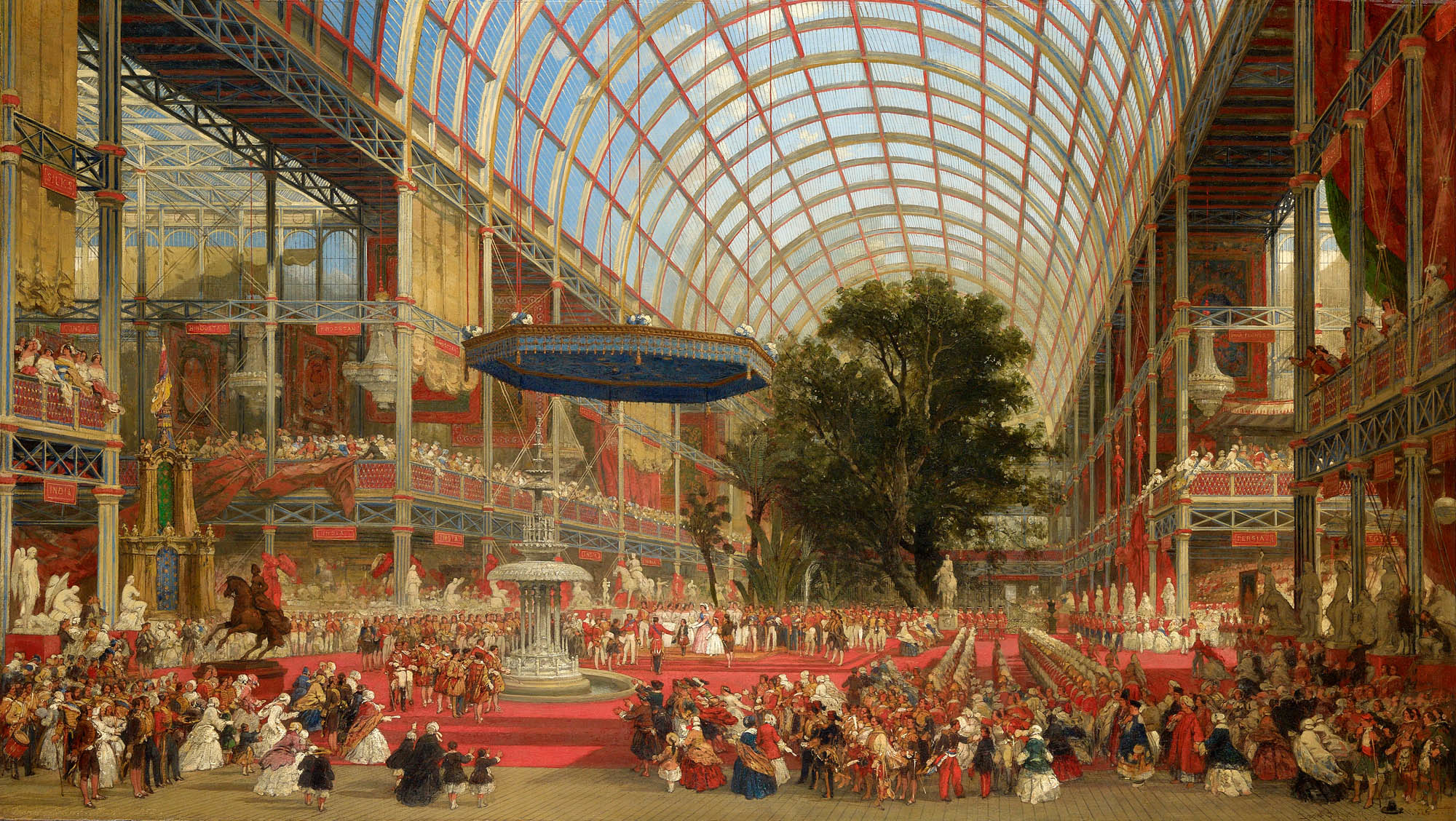
The Inauguration of the Great Exhibition by David Roberts

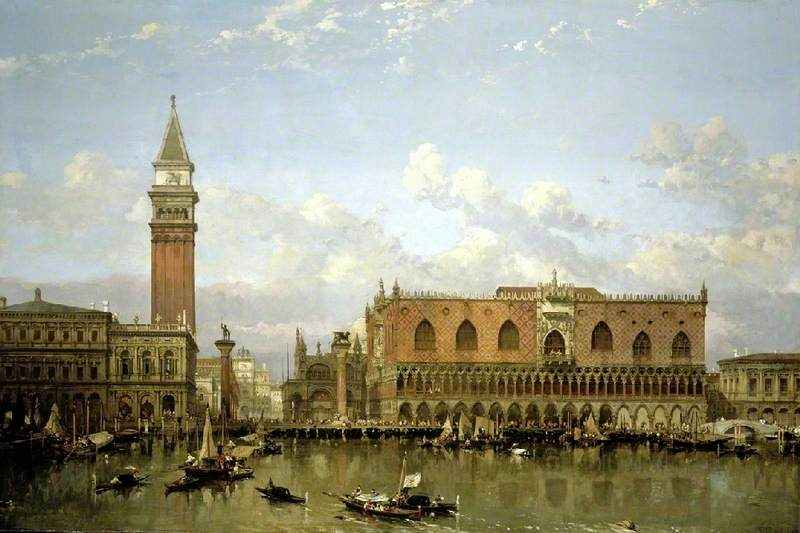
Venice by David Roberts

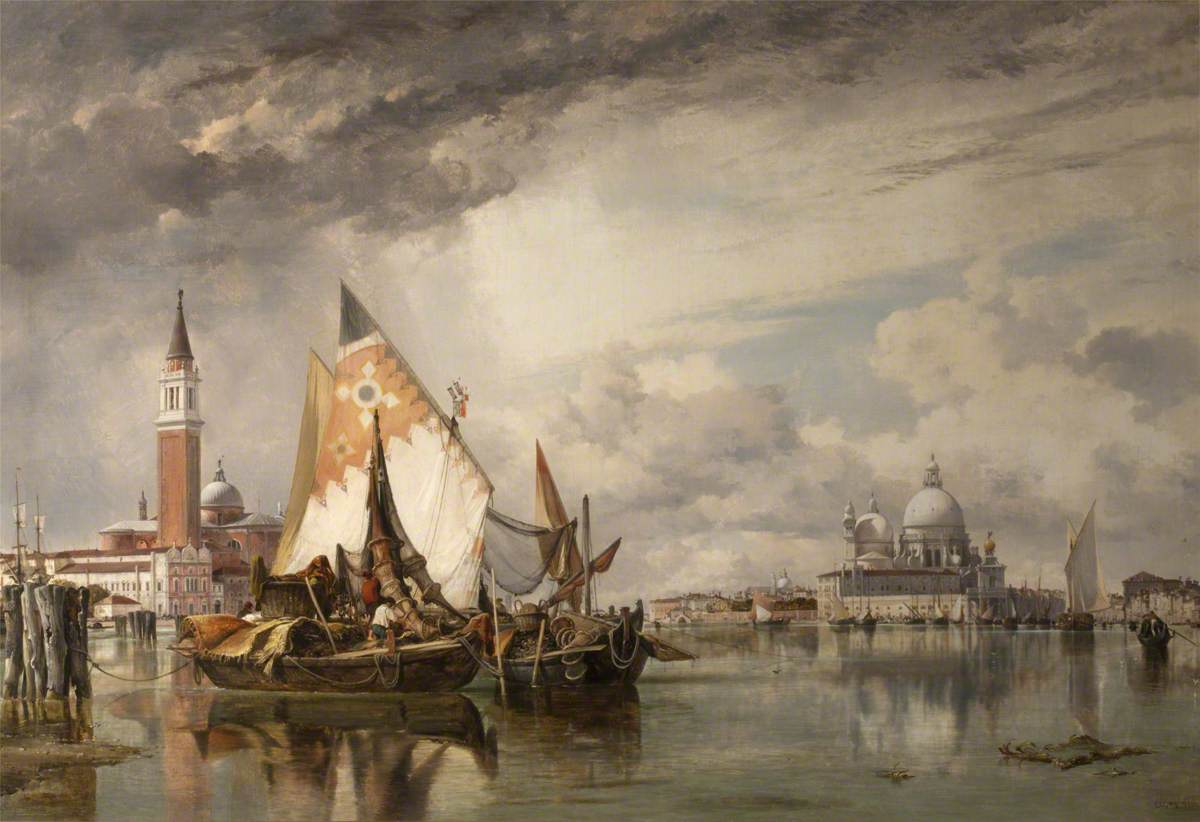
San Giorgio Maggiore and the Salute, Venice by Edward William Cooke

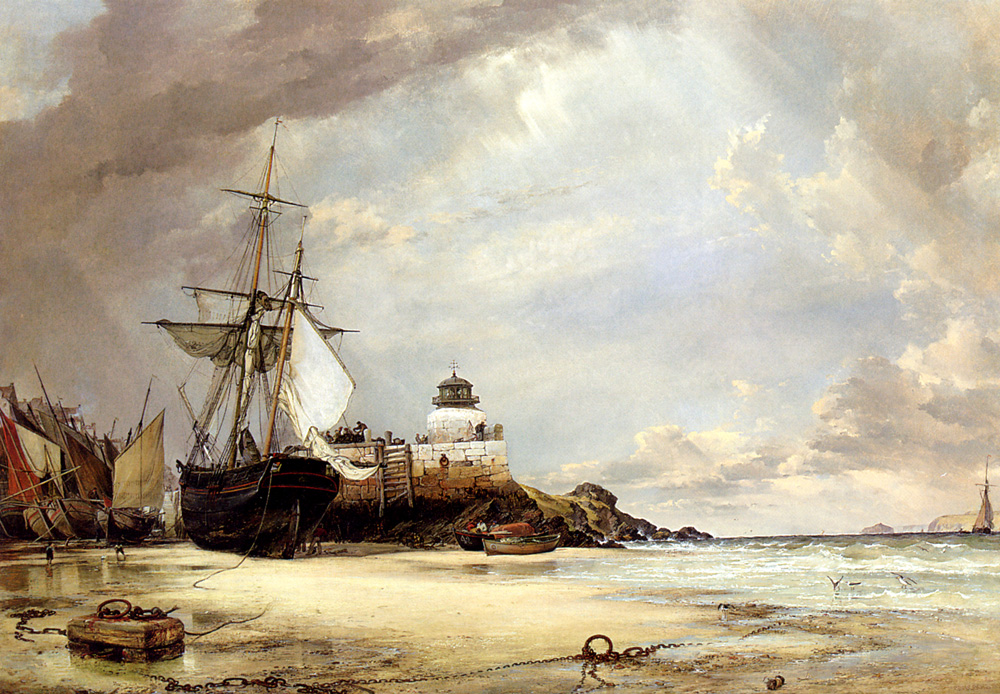
The Pier and Bay of St. Ives by Edward William Cooke

Love's Labour's Lost by Edward William Cooke

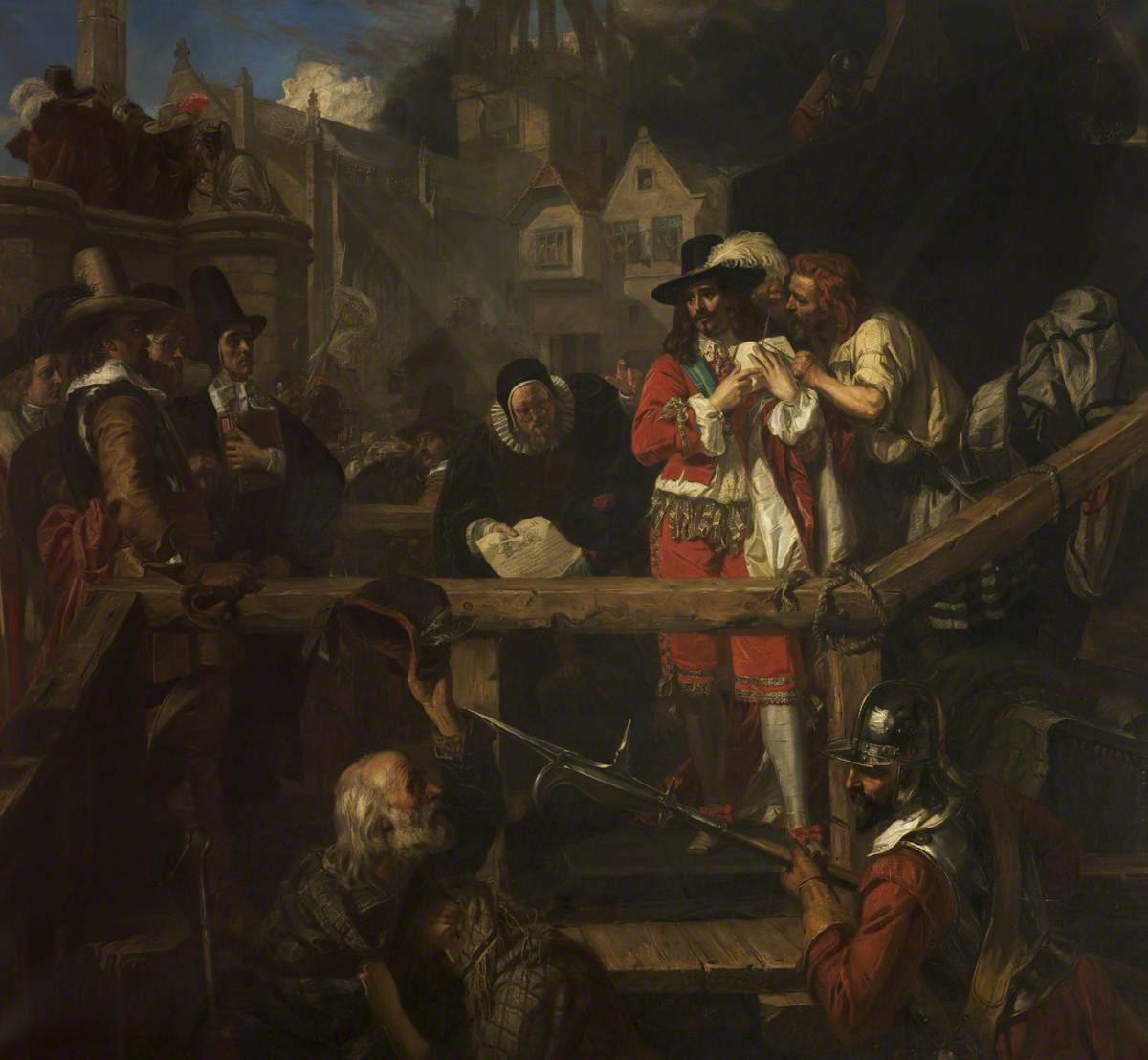
The Execution of the Marquis of Montrose by Edward Matthew Ward

Josephine Signing the Act of Her Divorce by Edward Matthew Ward

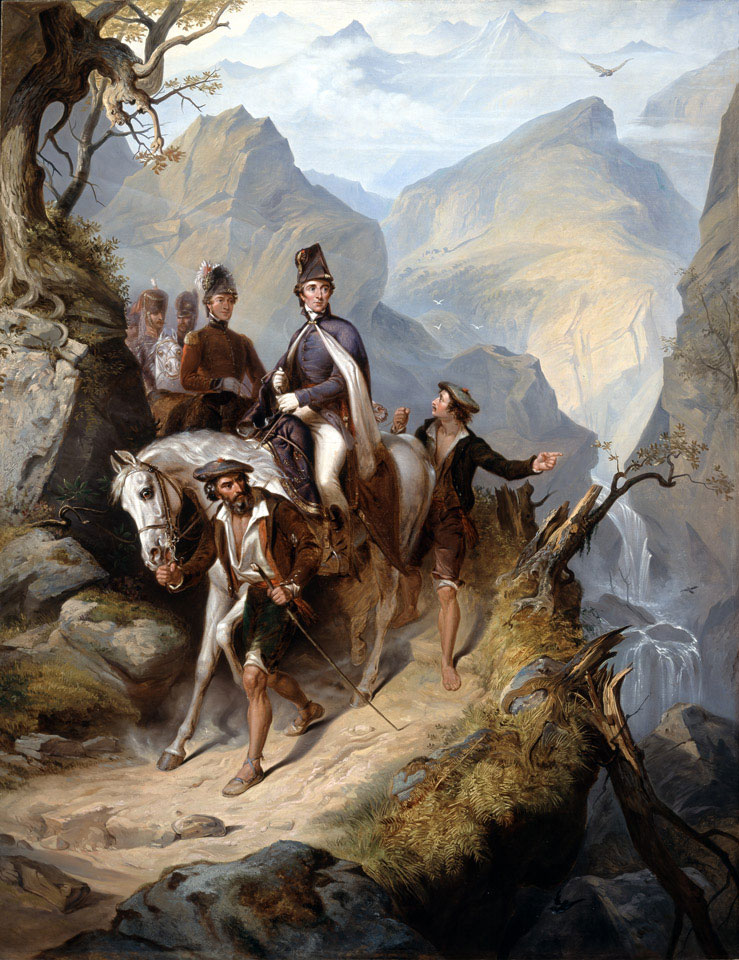
Wellington at Sorauren by Thomas Jones Barker

Night (Two Stags Battling by Moonlight) by Edwin Landseer

Morning by Edwin Landseer

The Village Post Office by William Frederick Witherington

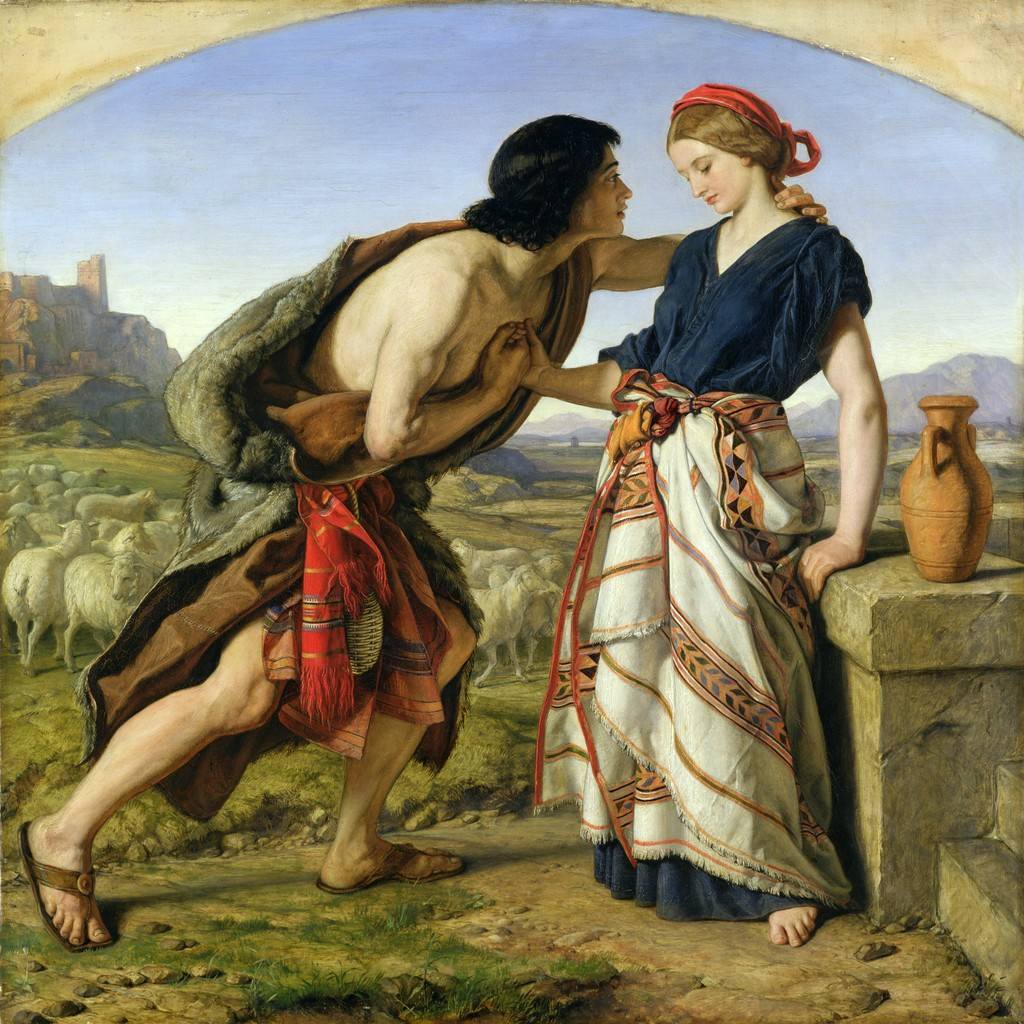
The Meeting of Jacob and Rachel by William Dyce

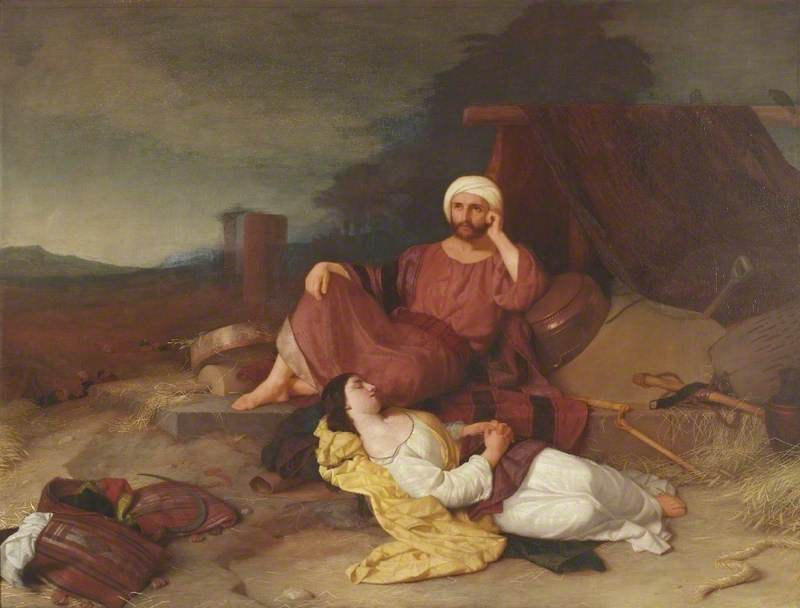
Boaz and Ruth by Charles Lock Eastlake

The Lost Path by Richard Redgrave

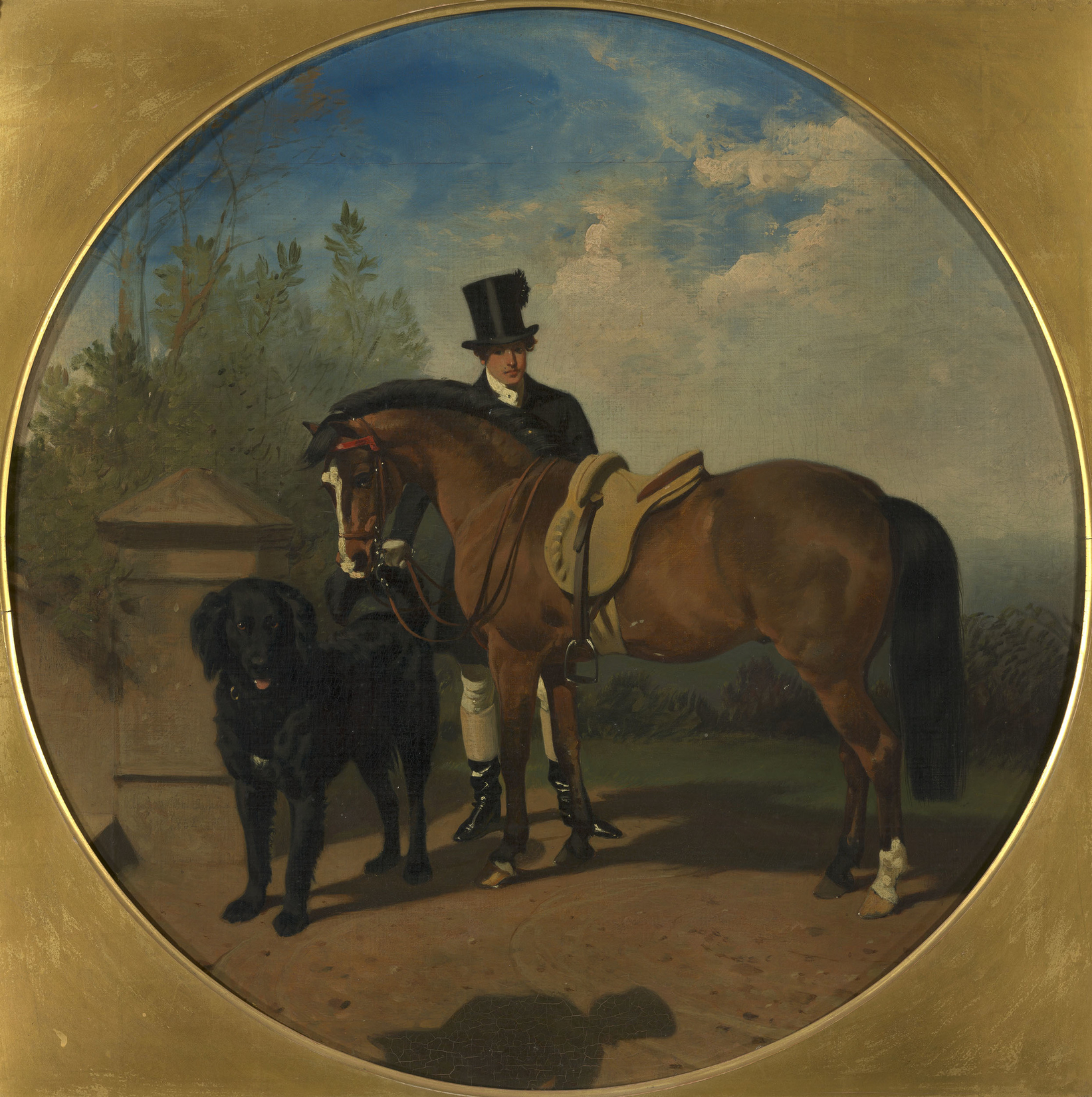
Caspar and Duck by Alfred Hitchens Corbould

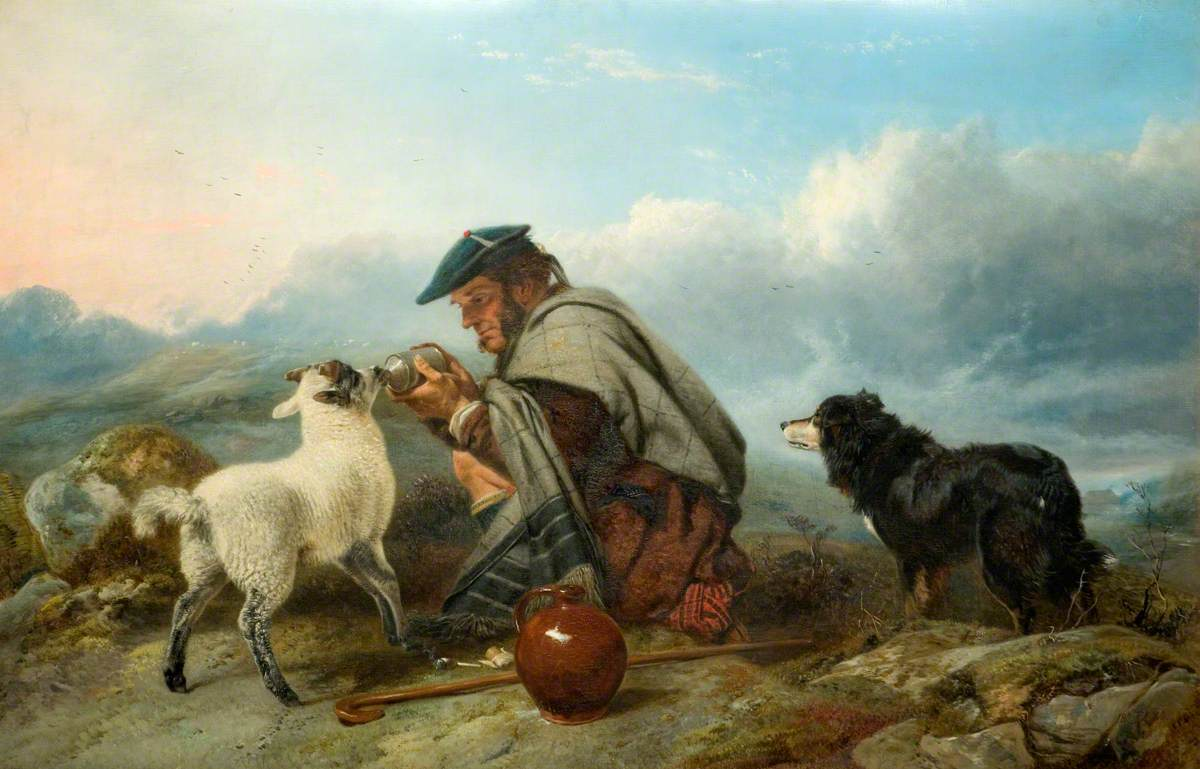
The Sick Lamb by Richard Ansdell

Sophia and Olivia by Thomas Faed

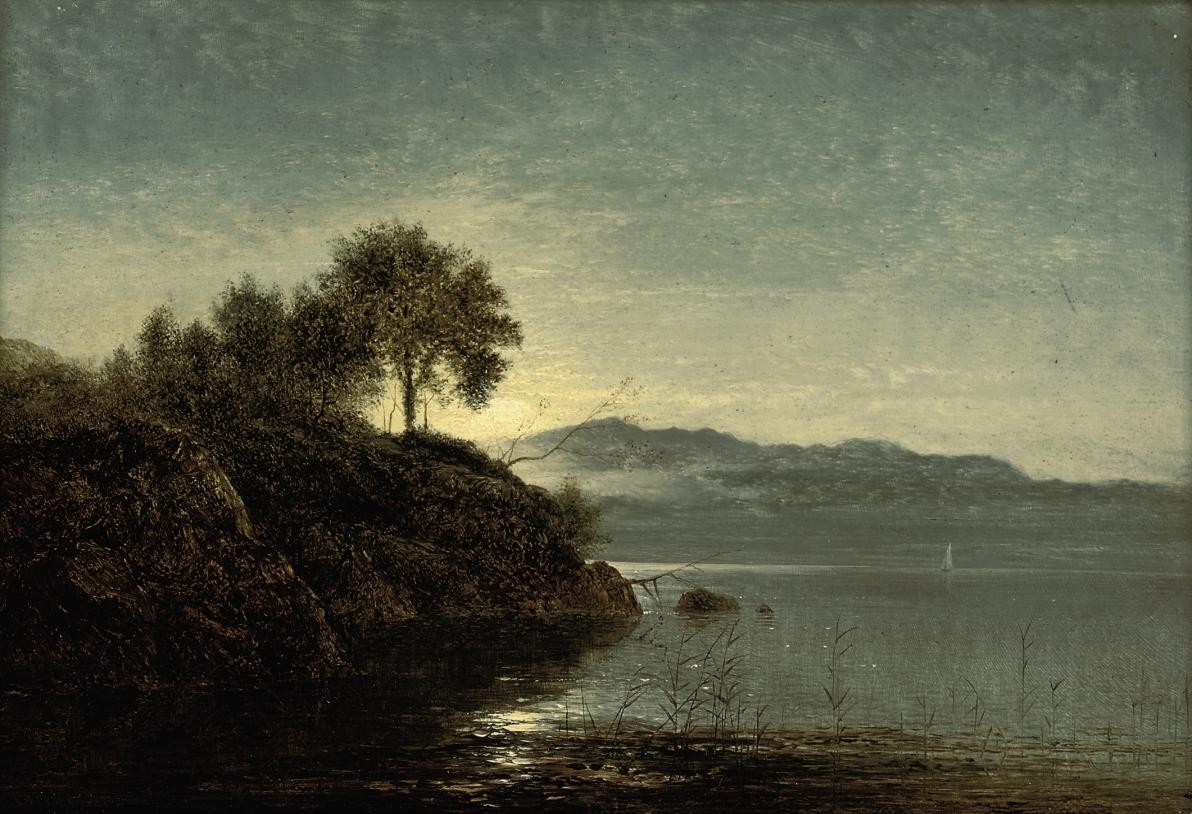
The Rising Moon by Arthur Gilbert

Lady Jane Grey and Roger Ascham by John Callcott Horsley

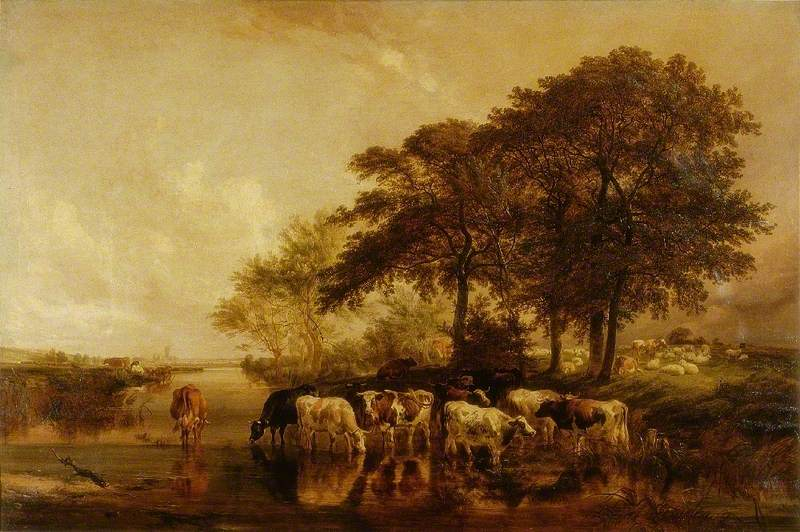
Canterbury from Tonford by Thomas Sidney Cooper

Catherine's Dream by Henry Nelson O'Neil

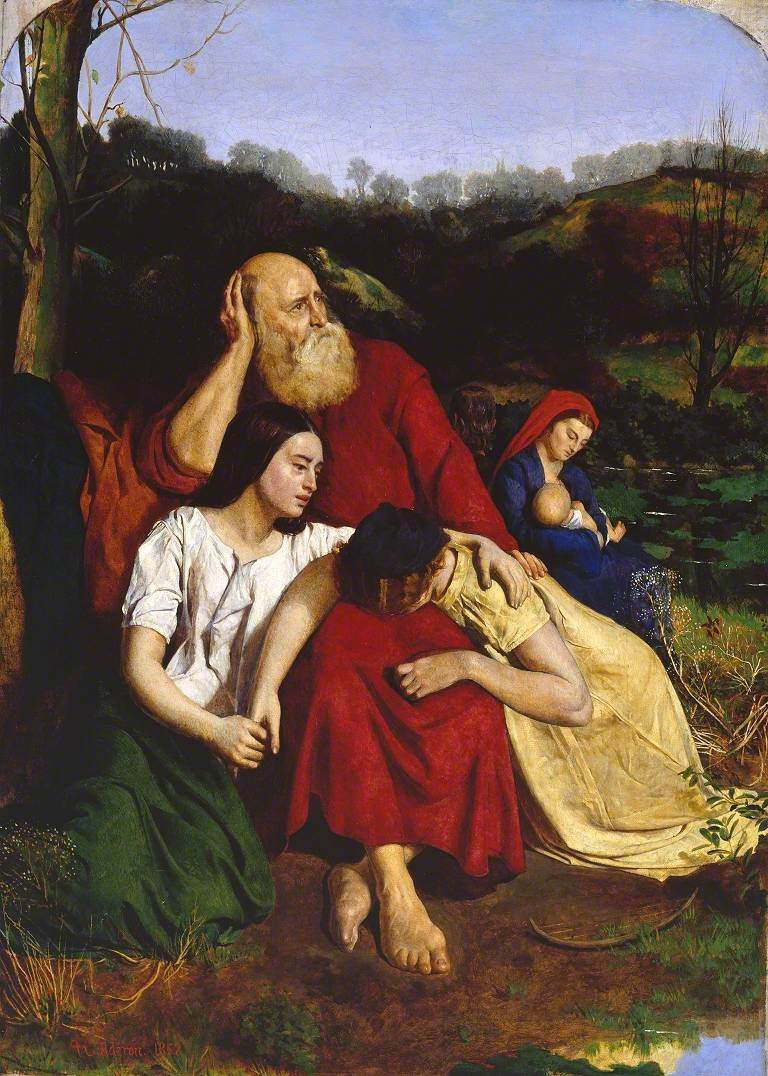
By the Waters of Babylon by Philip Hermogenes Calderon

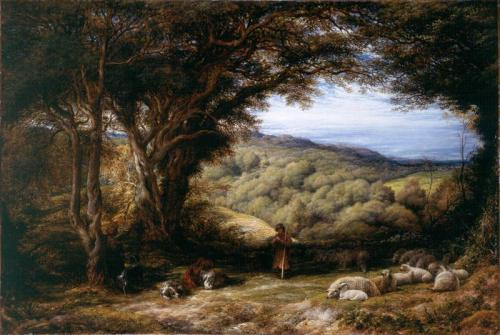
Under the Hawthorn by John Linnell

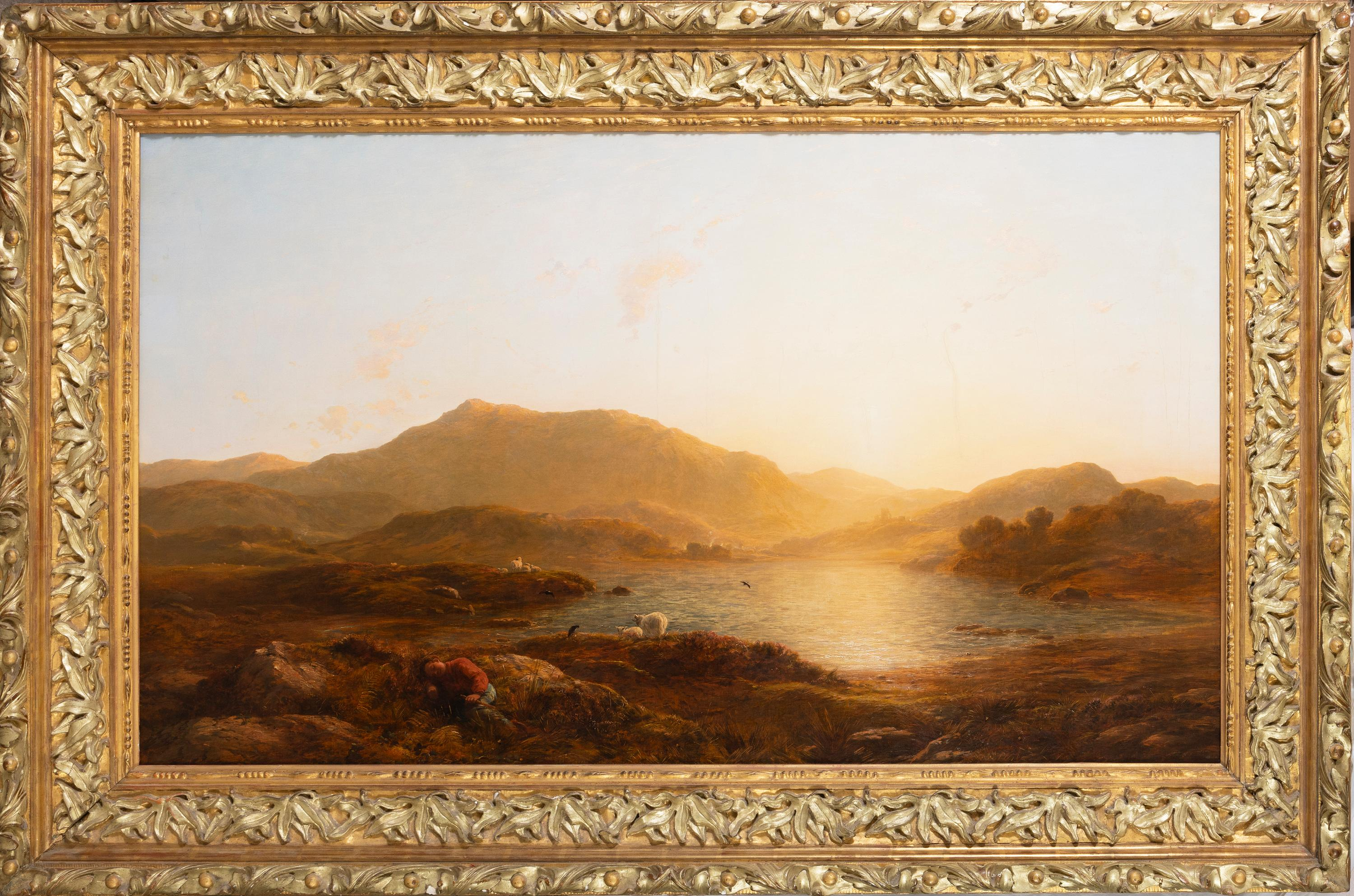
How Shepherds Lose Their Sheep Signed by Thomas Danby

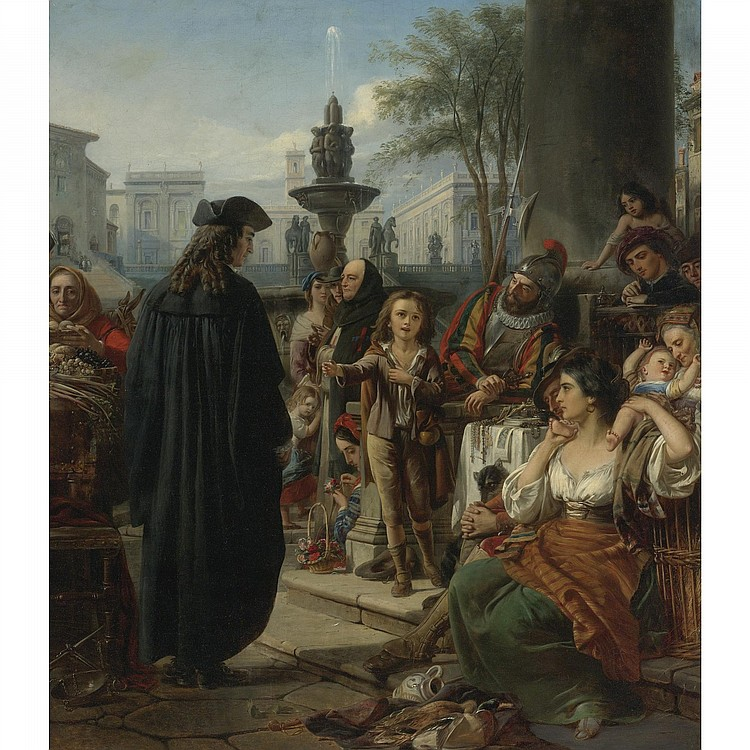
Metastasio as a Child is Discovered by Gravina Singing by Robert McInnes

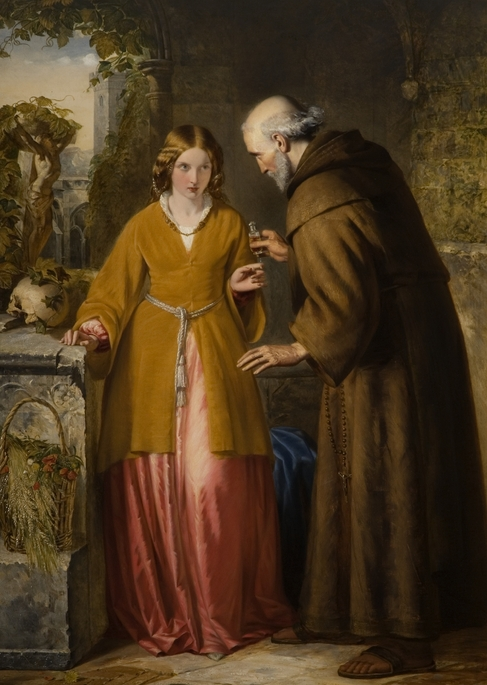
Juliet and the Friar by William James Grant

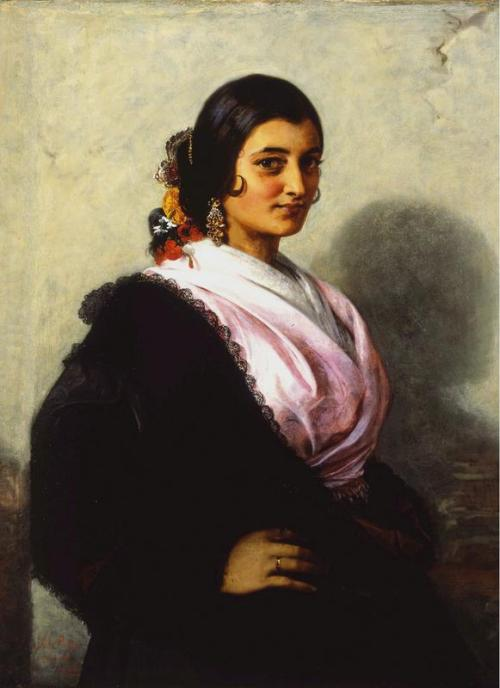
The Pearl of Triana by John Phillip

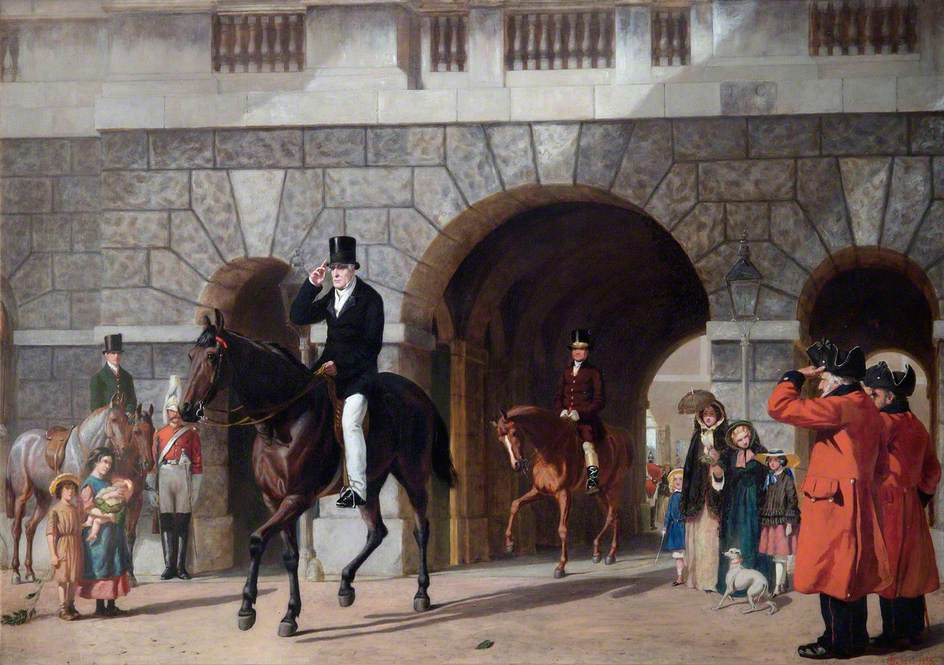
His Last Return from Duty by James William Glass

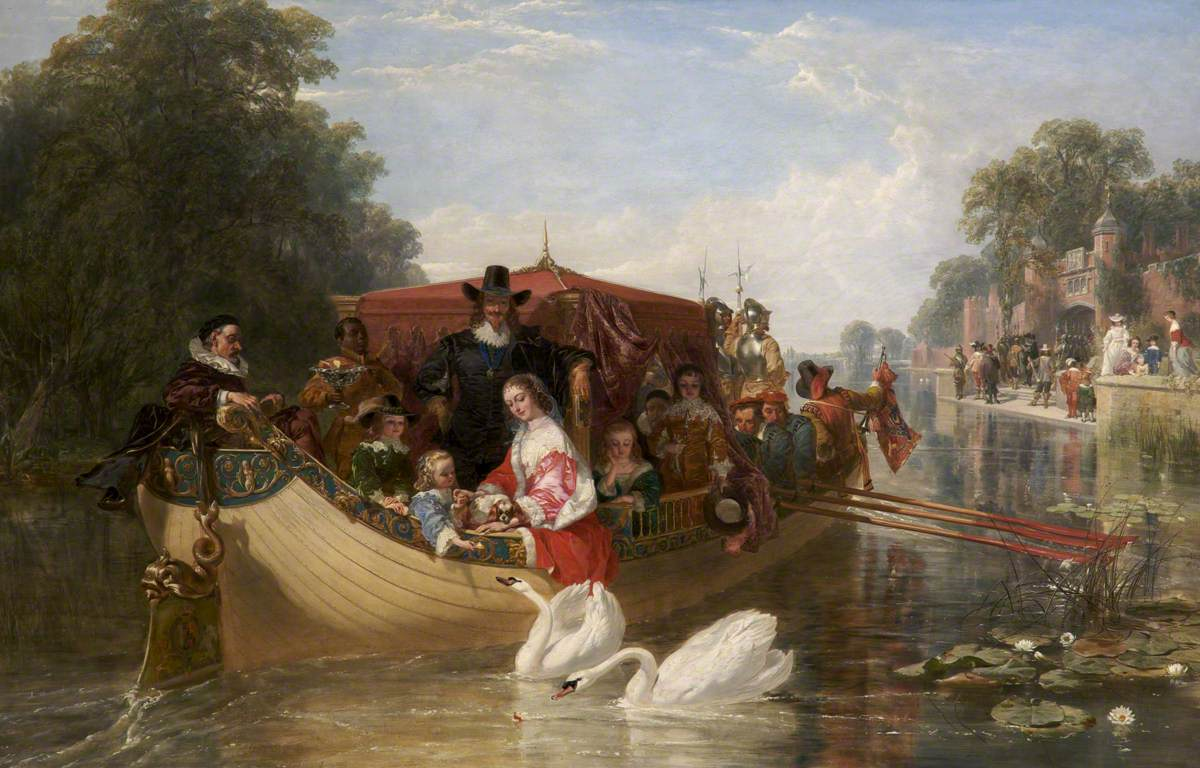
An Episode in the Happier Days of Charles I by Frederick Goodall

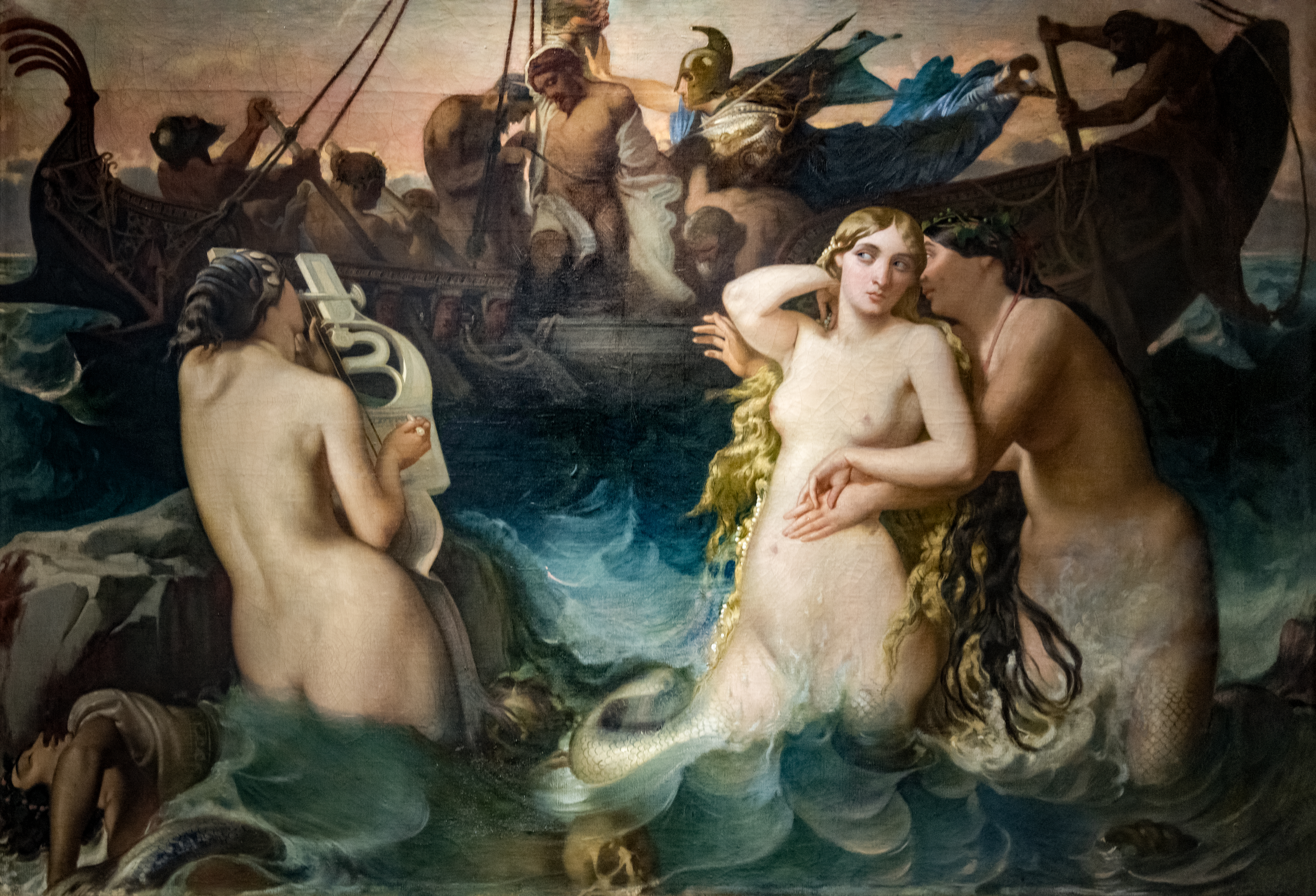
The Sirens by Victor Mottez

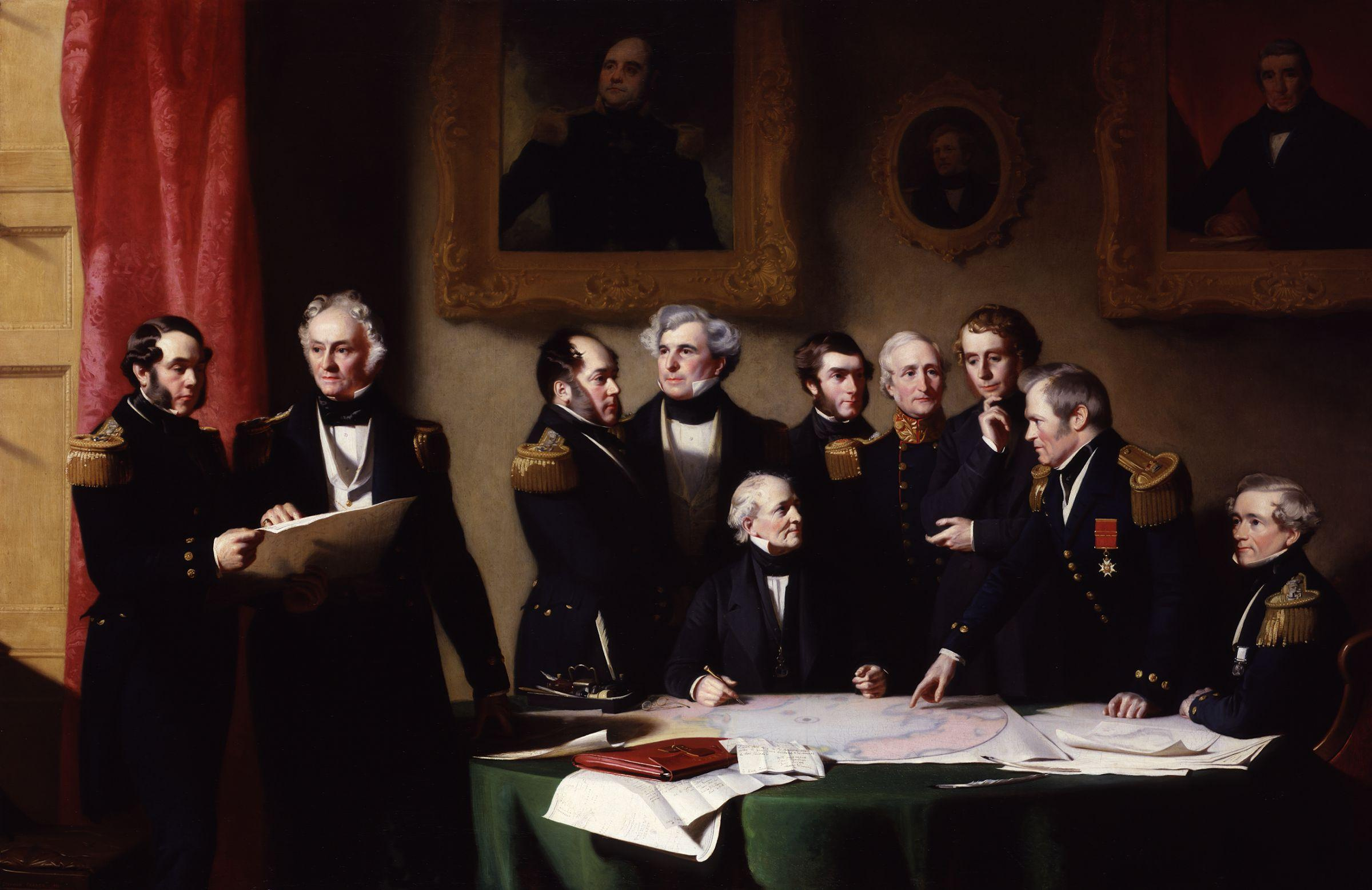
The Arctic Council Planning a Search for Sir John Franklin by Stephen Pearce

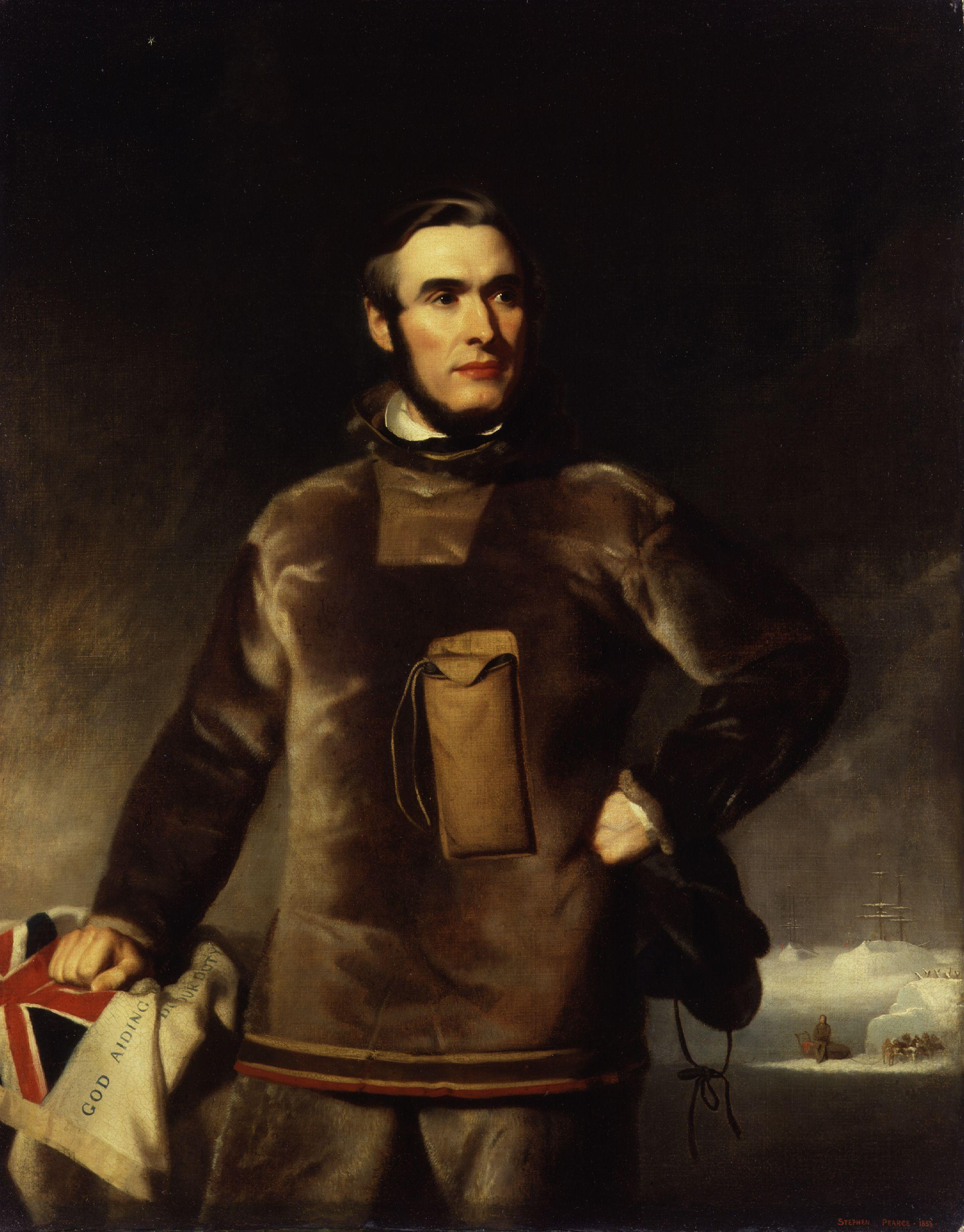
William Penny by Stephen Pearce

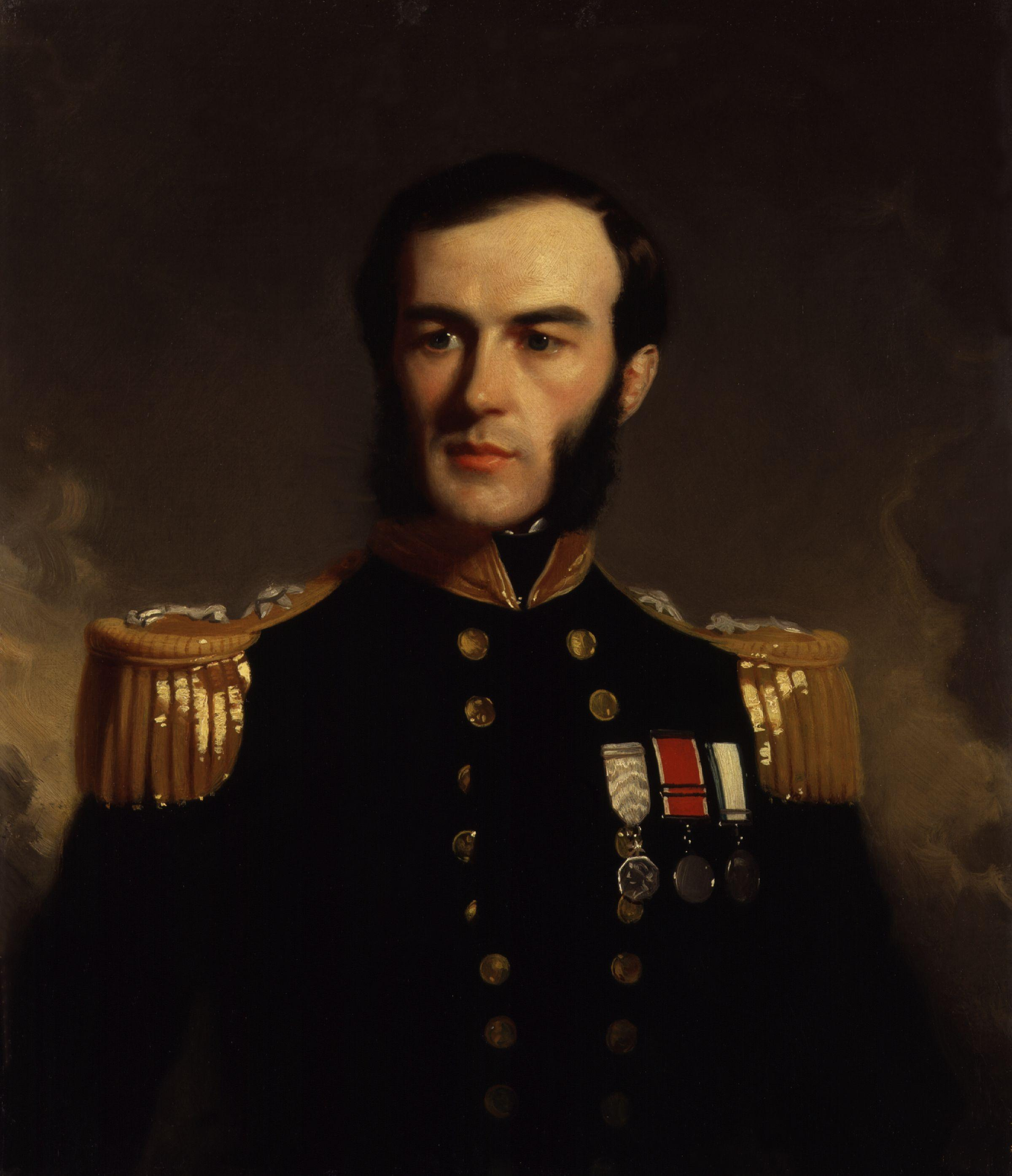
Edward Augustus Inglefield by Stephen Pearce

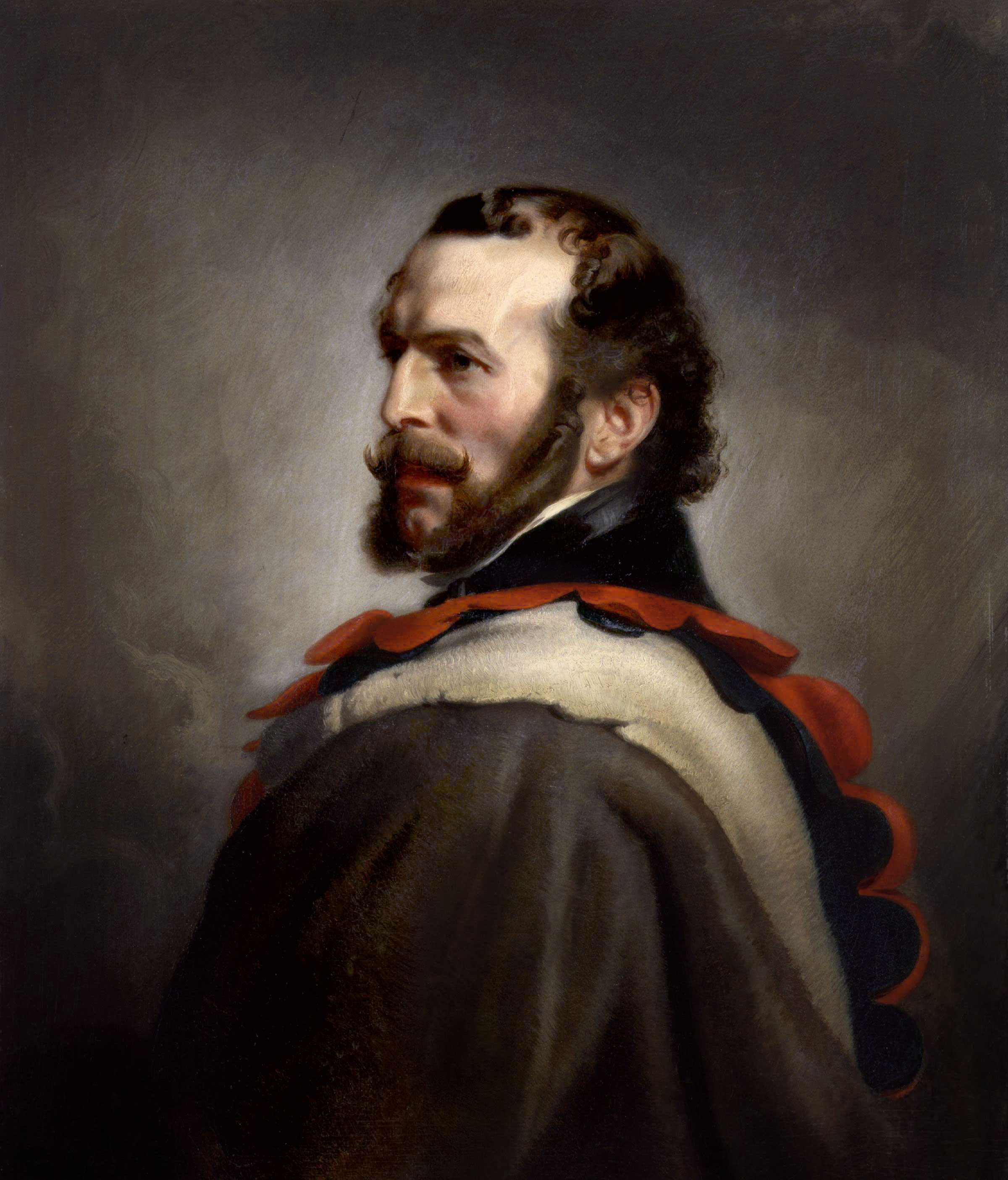
John Rae by Stephen Pearce

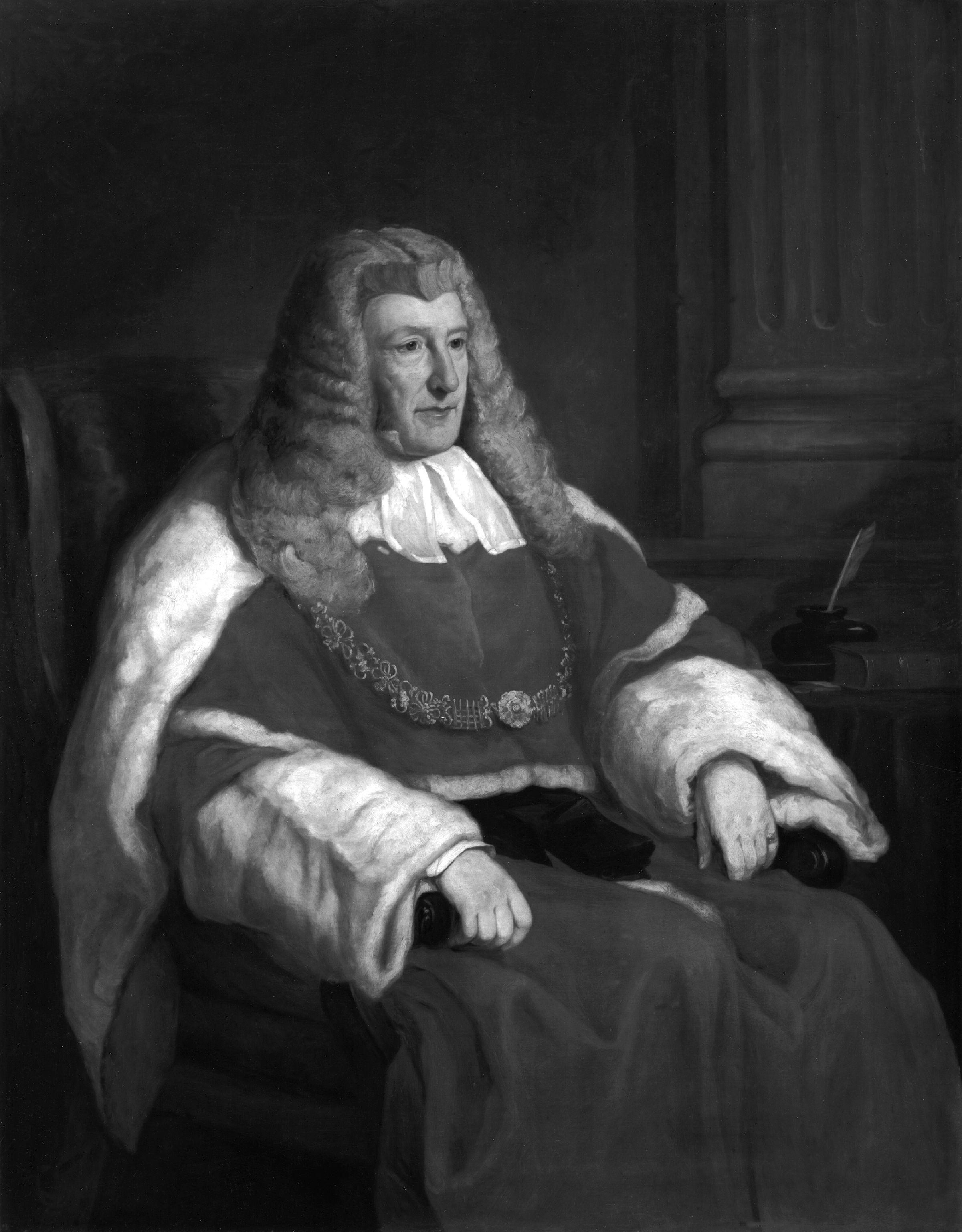
Lord Campbell by Francis Grant

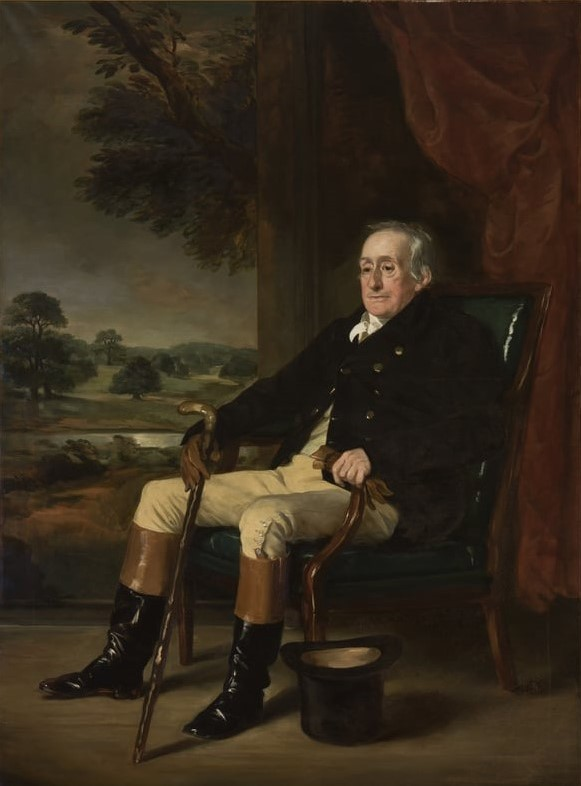
Portrait of the Duke of Portland by Francis Grant

Marchioness of Londonderry by Francis Grant

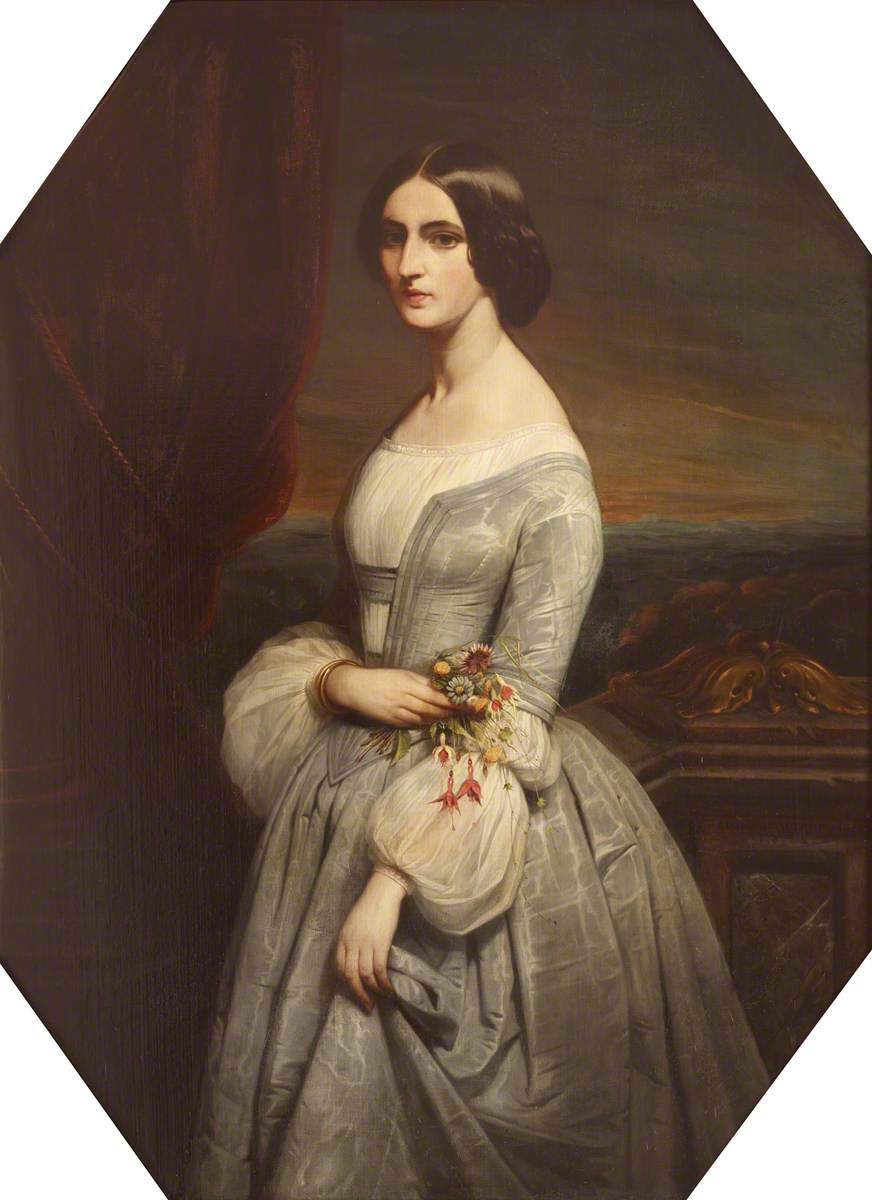
Eliza Seymour by Claude Jacquand

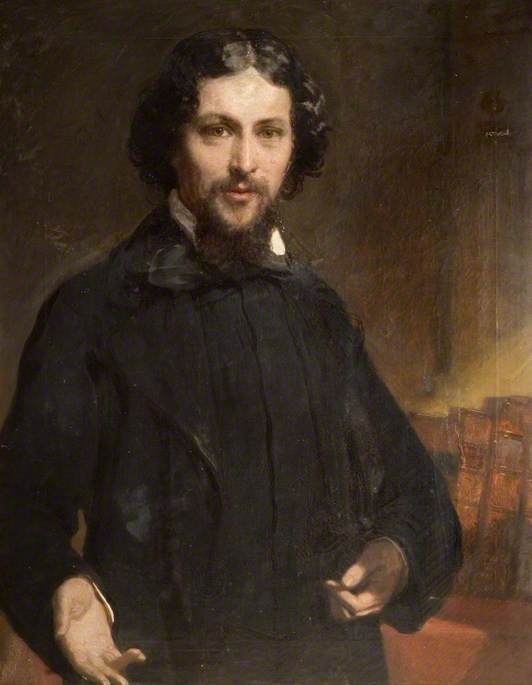
George Dawson by John Prescott Knight

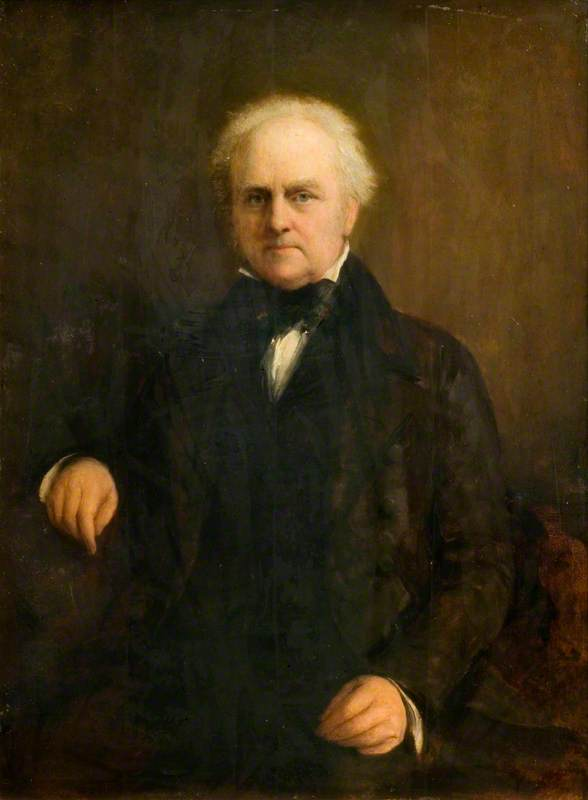
Walter Savage Landor by William Boxall

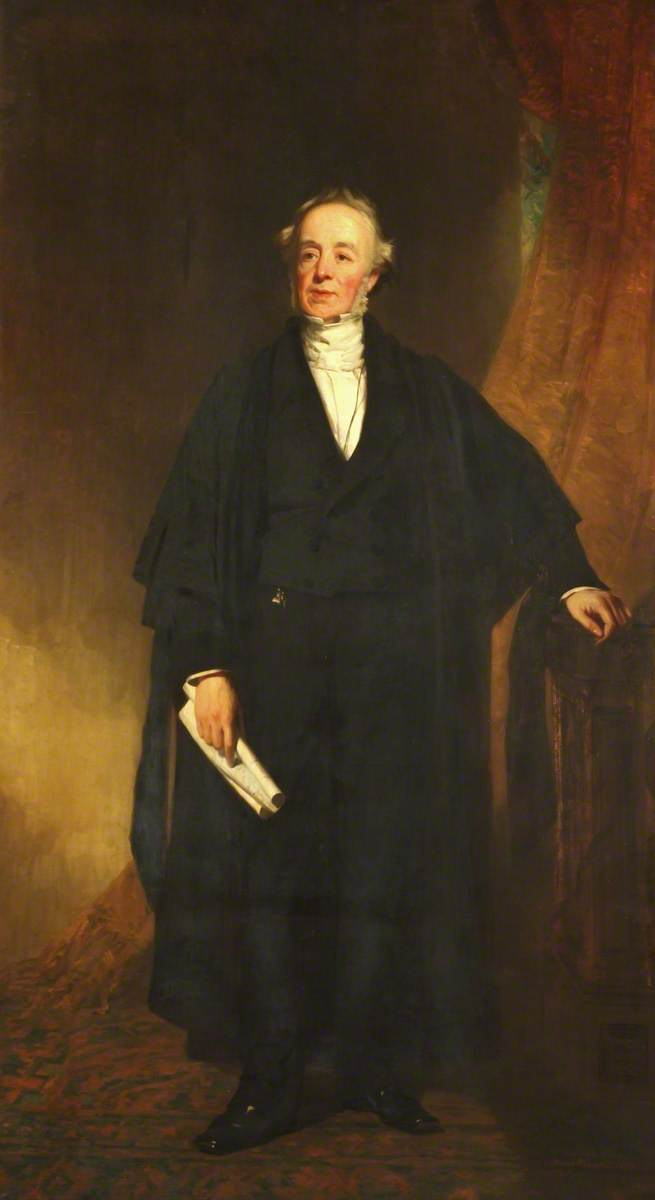
Sir John Bent by Philip Westcott

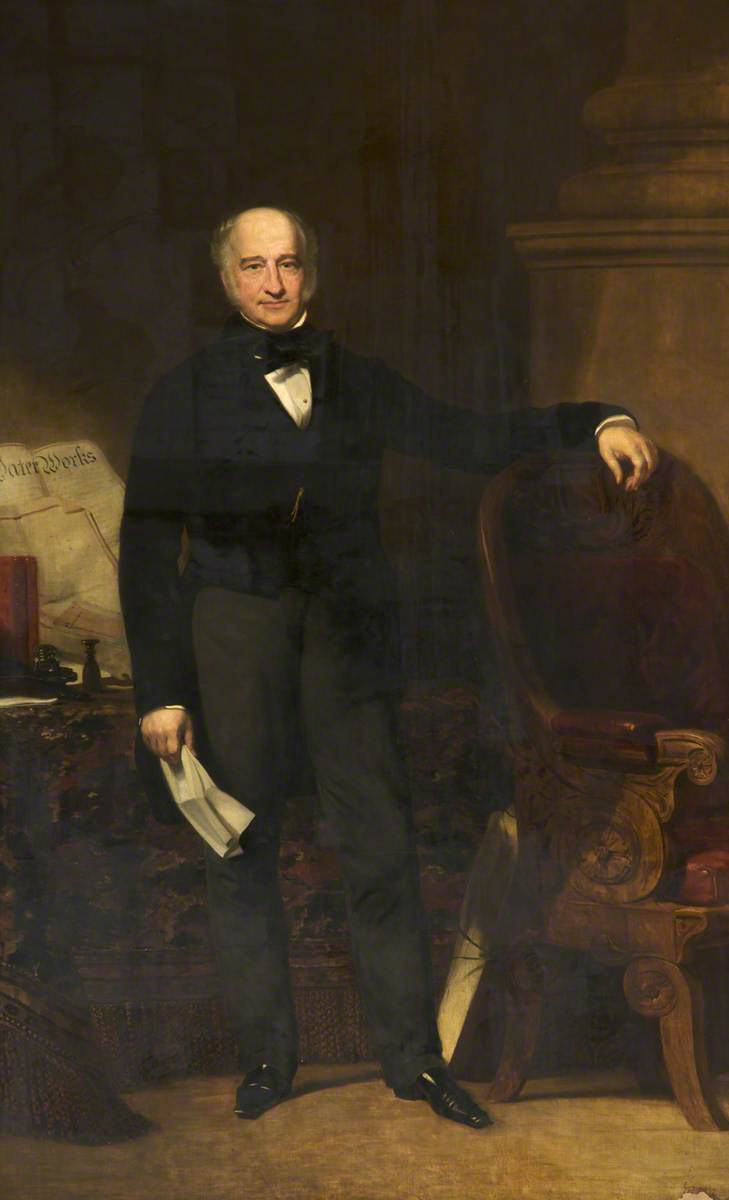
Elkanah Armitage by George Patten

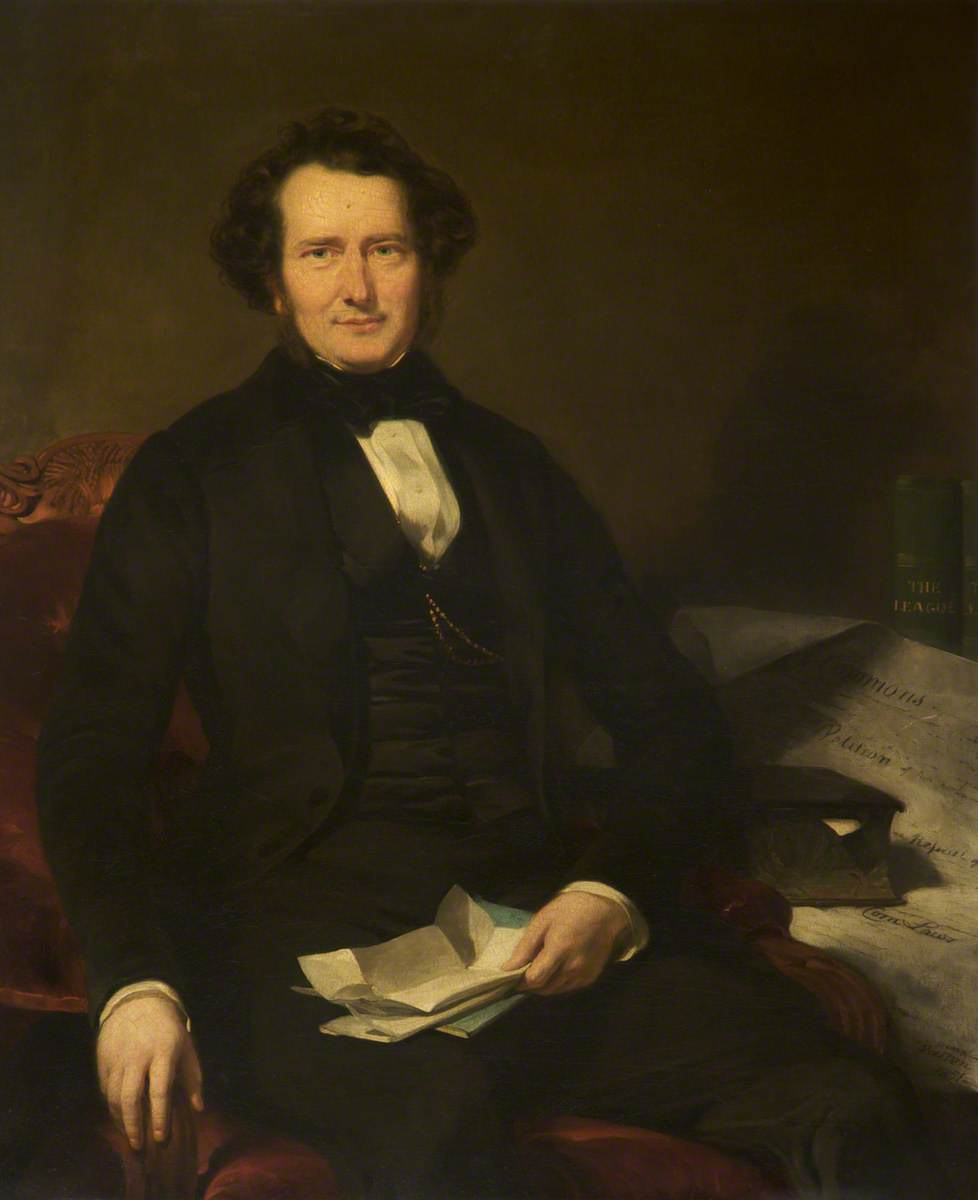
George Wilson by George Patten

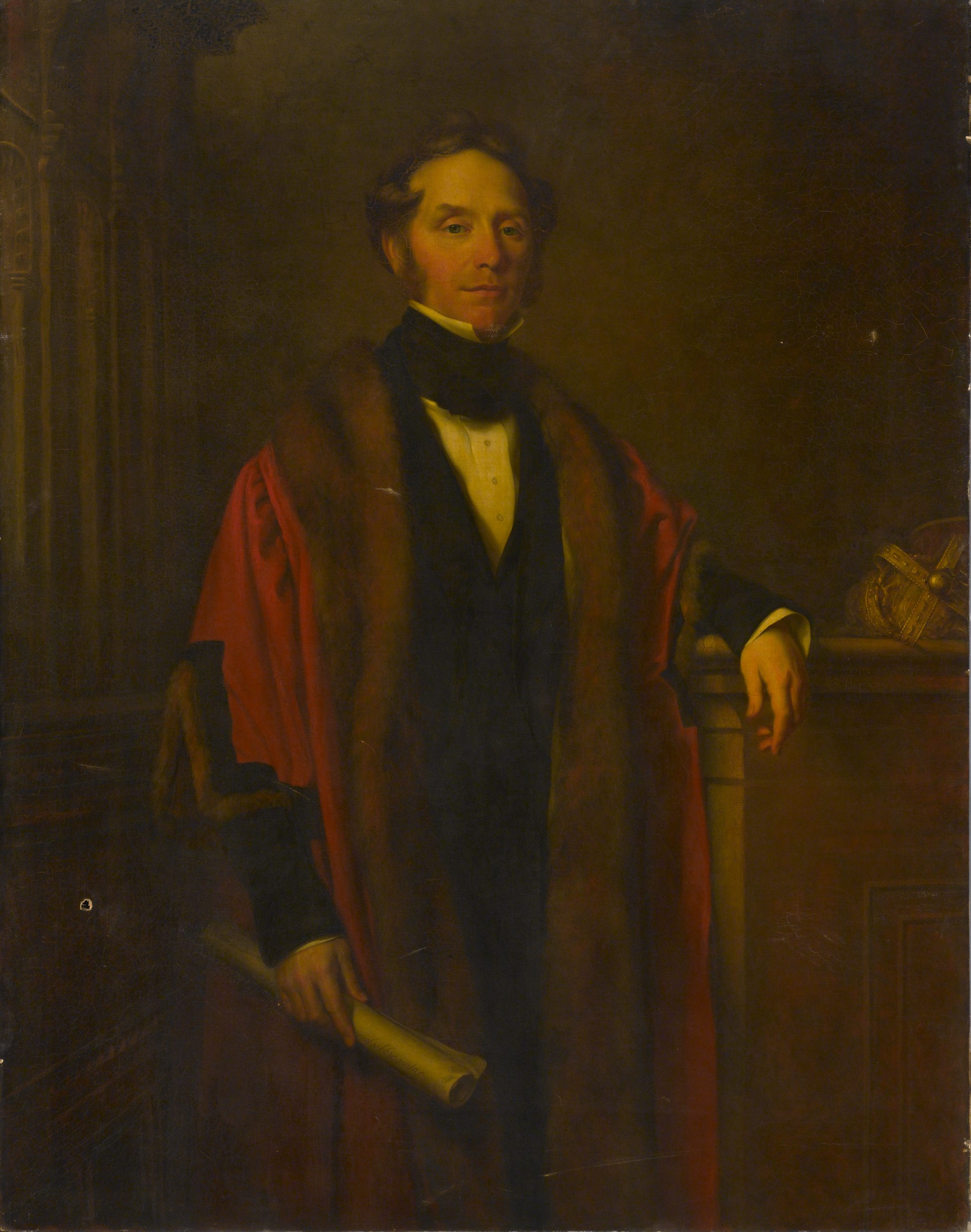
William Wills Hooper by Richard Augustus Clack

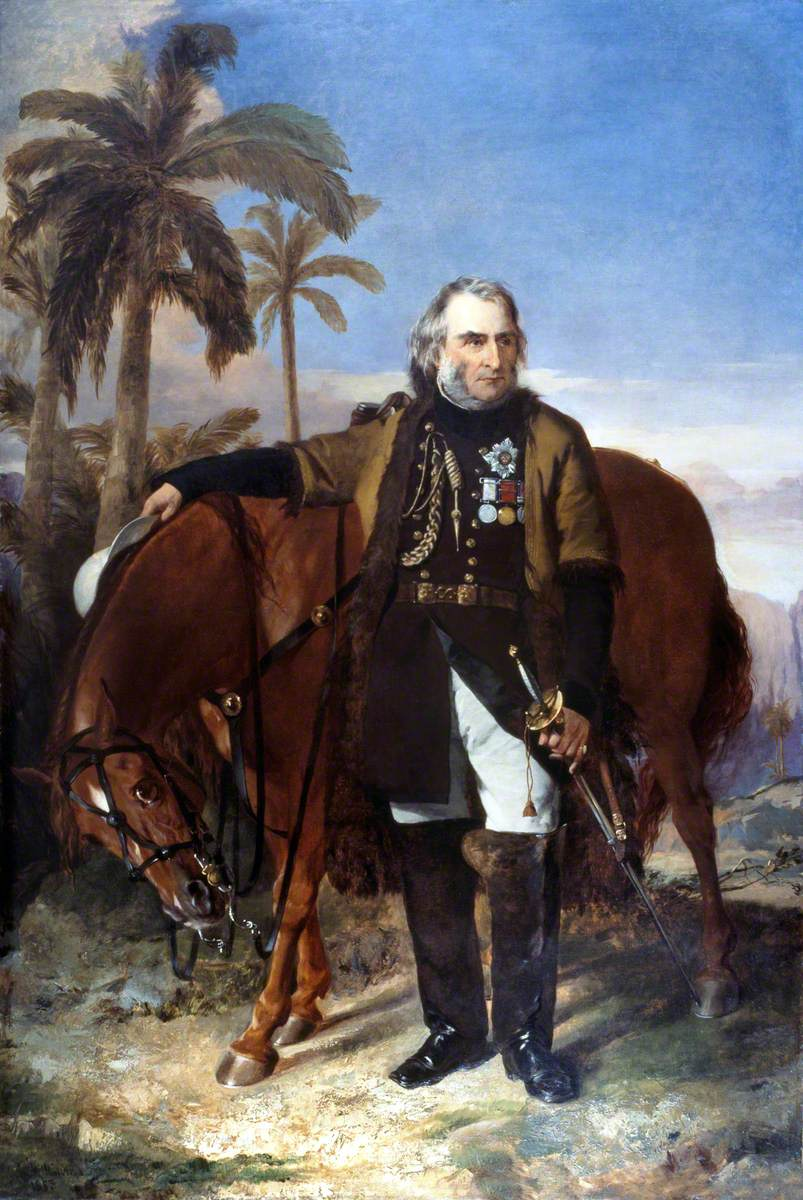
Charles James Napier by Edwin Williams

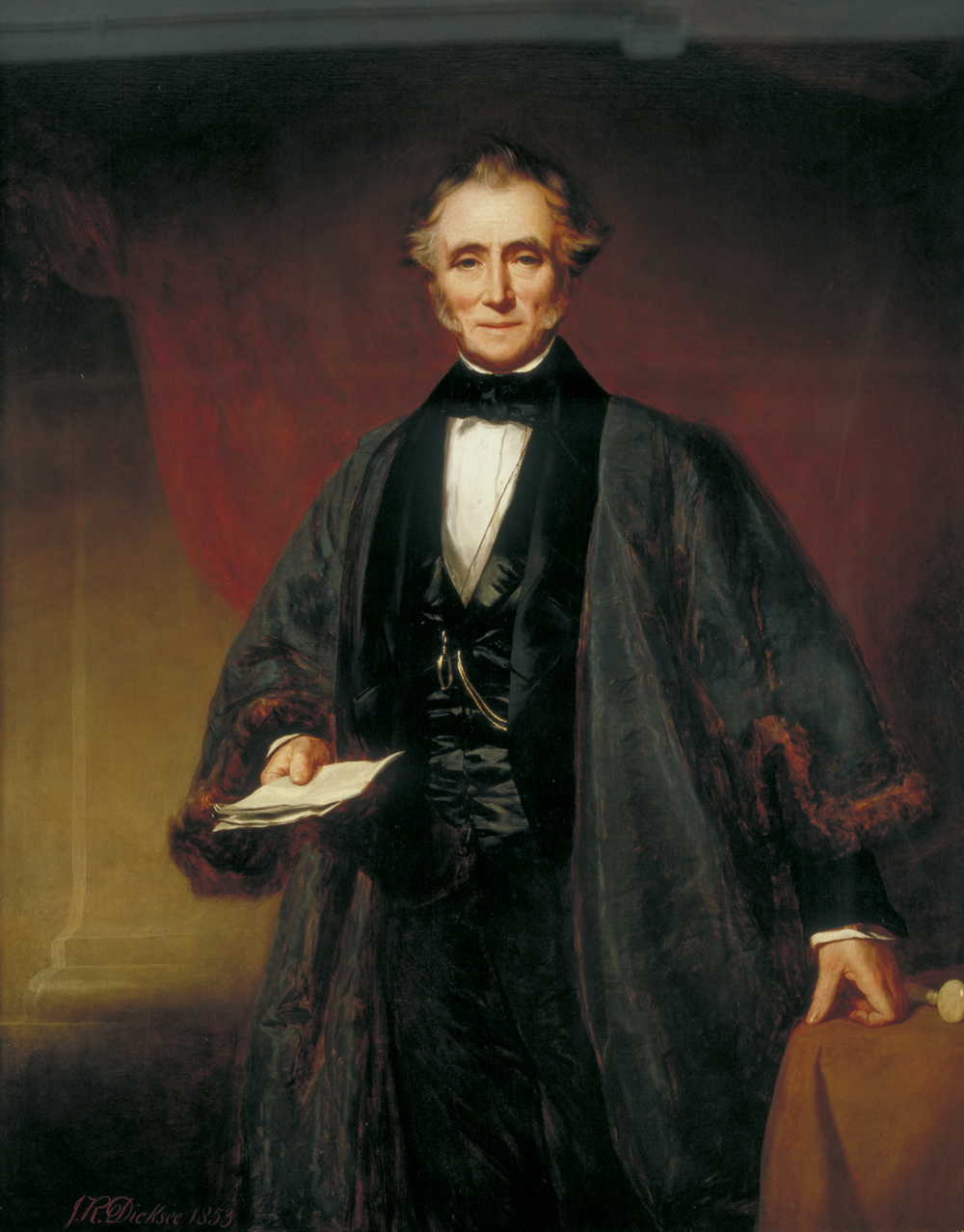
Warren Stormes Hale by John Robert Dicksee

== See also ==
- Salon of 1853, contemporary French art exhibition

== Bibliography ==
- Murray, Peter. Daniel Maclise, 1806-1870: Romancing the Past. Crawford Art Gallery, 2009.
- Riding, Christine. John Everett Millais. Harry N. Abrams, 2006.
- Van der Merwe, Pieter & Took, Roger. The Spectacular Career of Clarkson Stanfield. Tyne and Wear County Council Museums, 1979.
