= The Victory Towed into Gibraltar =

Painting by Clarkson Stanfield

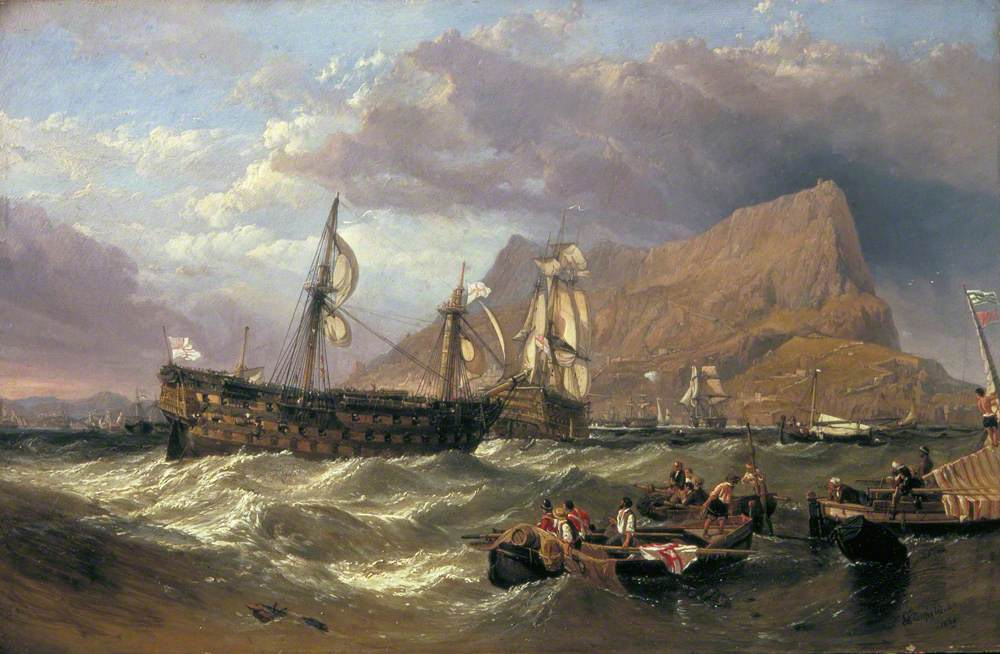
- Version in the Guildhall Art Gallery
- Artist: Clarkson Stanfield
- Year: 1853
- Type: Oil on canvas, landscape painting
- Dimensions: 176 cm × 262 cm (69 in × 103 in)
- Location: Private collection

The Victory Towed into Gibraltar is an 1853 oil painting by the British artist Clarkson Stanfield. Combining seascape and history painting, it depicts the Royal Navy's HMS Victory being towed into the British stronghold of Gibraltar in 1805 with the Rock of Gibraltar visible in the background. The painting is set a week after the Battle of Trafalgar, a decisive British victory over a combined Franco-Spanish fleet during the Napoleonic Wars. In the aftermath of the battle, a violent storm had a heavy impact on the already battered British fleet. On the right are fishing boats whose occupants watch the passing ship.

The scene is given added poignancy by the fact that the body of the British commander Lord Nelson is aboard his former flagship. He was subsequently taken back for a state burial in London. The painting was produced nearly half a century after the event, and as one of three major works Stanfield produced of the Trafalgar campaign including his 1836 battle scene The Battle of Trafalgar. The work was commissioned by the railway engineering contractor and politician Morton Peto. It was displayed at the Royal Academy's Summer Exhibition of 1853 at the National Gallery in London and subsequent Manchester Art Treasures exhibition in 1857. Stanfield produced a number of different versions of the painting with copies in the Guildhall Art Gallery, Victoria and Albert Museum and elsewhere. It has been described as one of the most successful paintings of the Age of Sail.

== See also ==
- The Morning After Trafalgar, an 1863 painting by Stanfield

== Bibliography ==
- Eiss, Harry. Insanity and Genius: Masks of Madness and the Mapping of Meaning and Value. Cambridge Scholars Publishing, 2004.
- Roe, Sonia & Hardy, Pat. Oil Paintings in Public Ownership in the City of London. Public Catalogue Foundation, 2009.
- Tracy, Nicholas. Britannia’s Palette: The Arts of Naval Victory. McGill-Queen's Press, 2007.
- Van der Merwe, Pieter & Took, Roger. The Spectacular career of Clarkson Stanfield. Tyne and Wear County Council Museums, 1979.
