= The Inauguration of the Great Exhibition =

Painting by David Roberts

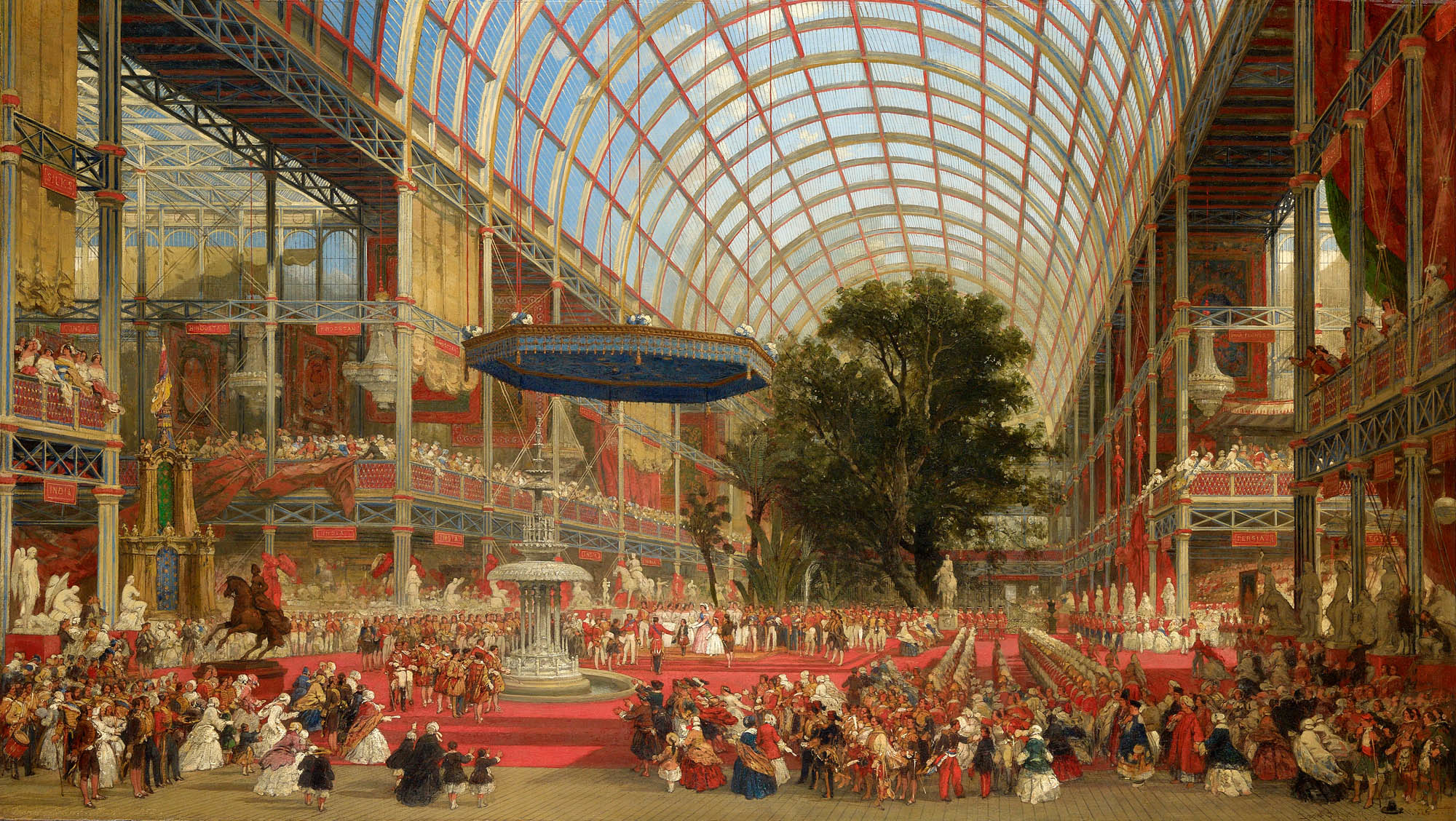
- Artist: David Roberts
- Year: 1852
- Type: Oil on canvas, history painting
- Dimensions: 86.4 cm × 152.4 cm (34.0 in × 60.0 in)
- Location: Royal Collection

The Inauguration of the Great Exhibition is an oil on canvas history painting by the British artist David Roberts, from 1852. It features a panoramic of the opening of the Great Exhibition at the Crystal Palace in Hyde Park on 1 May 1851. It is held at the Royal Collection.

== History and description ==
Queen Victoria and the royal family, including Prince Albert, the Prince of Wales and the Princess Royal, are shown under a baldacchino canopy in the centre. On the left an equestrian statue of the queen produced by Thomas Thornycroft is visble.

After being impressed by the smaller oil painting he had produced of the scene, the Queen and Albert commissioned Roberts to produce a larger and more detailed version of the event. They made constant suggestions for alterations for the work in a series of meetings they had with an artist. The painting was displayed at the Royal Academy's Summer Exhibition of 1853 at the National Gallery, in London. It was given as a gift by Victoria to Albert and was hung at Buckingham Palace. It remains in the Royal Collection.

== See also ==
- The Opening of the Great Exhibition by Queen Victoria by Henry Courtney Selous

== Bibliography ==
- Carlisle, Janice. Picturing Reform in Victorian Britain. Cambridge University Press, 2012.
- Clarke, Deborah & Remington, Vanessa. Scottish Artists 1750-1900: From Caledonia to the Continent. Royal Collection Trust, 2015.
- Marsden, Jonathan. Victoria & Albert: Art & Love. Royal Collection, 2010.
- Sim, Katherine. David Roberts R.A., 1796–1864: A Biography. Quartet Books, 1984.
