= San Giorgio Maggiore and the Salute, Venice =

Painting by Edward William Cooke

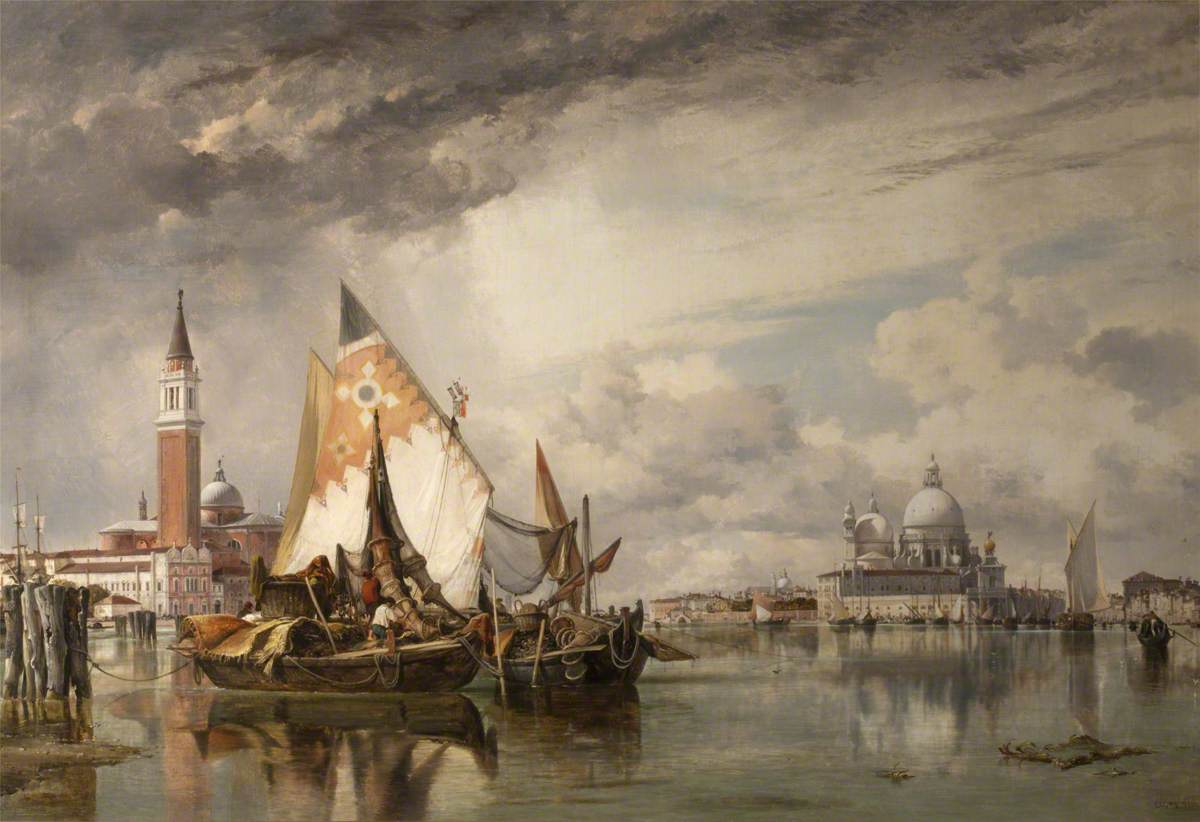
- Artist: Edward William Cooke
- Year: 1852
- Type: Oil on canvas, landscape painting
- Dimensions: 68 cm × 105.5 cm (27 in × 41.5 in)
- Location: Cragside, Northumberland

San Giorgio Maggiore and the Salute, Venice, with Fishing Craft of Chioggia and the Lagune is an oil on canvas landscape painting by the English artist Edward William Cooke, from 1852.

== Description ==
It depicts a view of Venice looking towards San Giorgio Maggiore and the Santa Maria della Salute. Cooke, strongly influenced by the work of Clarkson Stanfield, was a noted maritime painter. It was displayed at the Royal Academy Exhibition of 1853 at the National Gallery in London. The painting was acquired for 650 guineas in 1869 by Lord Armstrong. In 2002 it was auctioned at Christie's and acquired for Armstrong's historic residence Cragside, now controlled by the National Trust.

== Bibliography ==
- Munday, John. Edward William Cooke: A Man of His Time. Antique Collectors' Club, 1996.
