= 1852 in art =

Events from the year 1852 in art.

== Events ==
- February 5 – Hermitage Museum first opens to the public in Saint Petersburg.
- May 1 – The Salon of 1852 opens at the Palais-Royal in Paris
- May 3 – The Royal Academy Exhibition of 1852 opens at the National Gallery in London
- June 1 – The Hôtel Drouot is inaugurated in Paris as a fine art auction gallery.

== Works ==
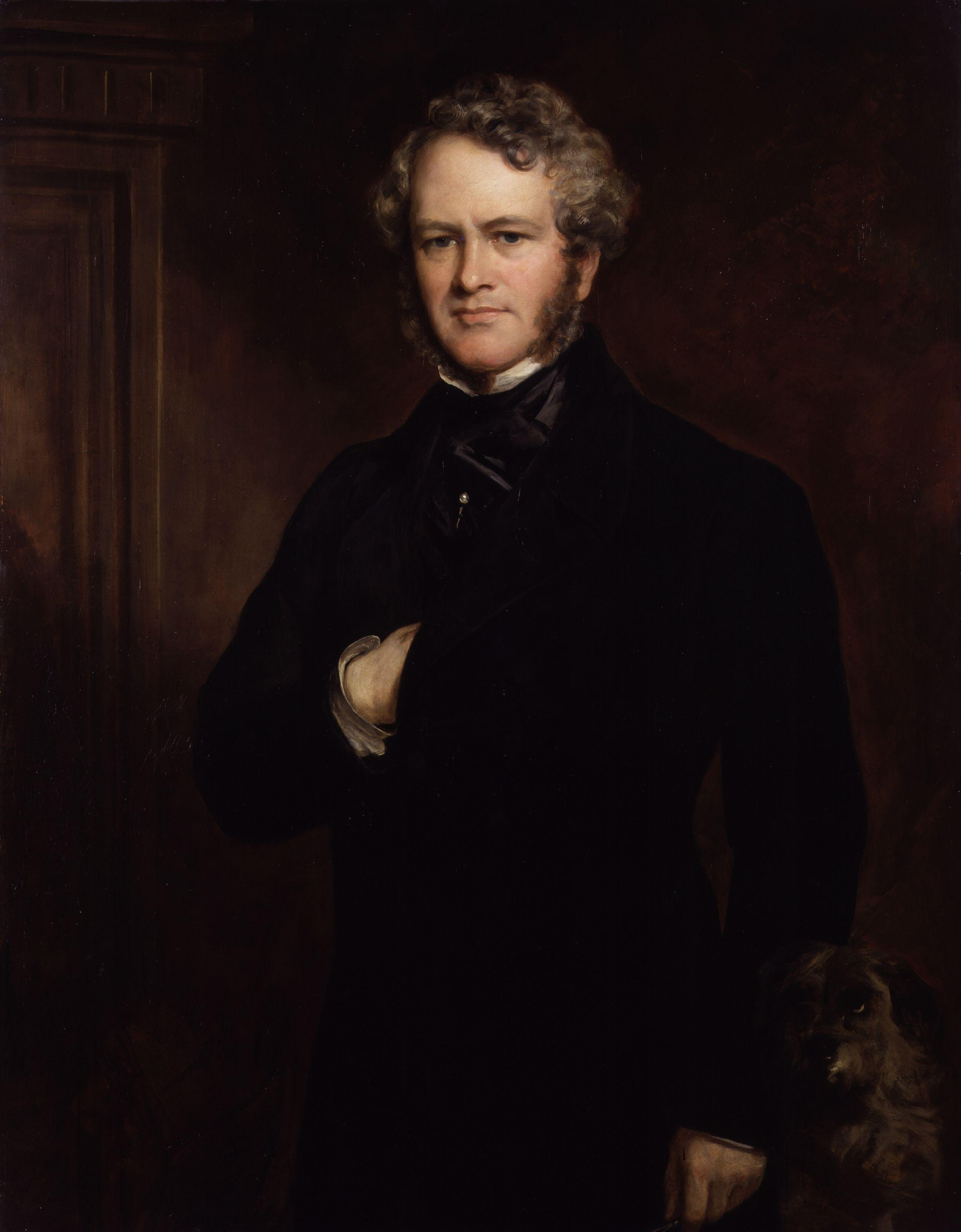
Portrait of Sir Edwin Landseer by Francis Grant

- Théodore Chassériau – Le Harem (approximate date)
- Frederic Edwin Church - The Natural Bridge, Virginia
- Edward William Cooke – San Giorgio Maggiore and the Salute, Venice
- Gustave Courbet
  - Village Damsels
  - A Girl Spinning
- Thomas Couture – Anselm Feuerbach
- Eugène Delacroix – Marphise
- Anselm Feuerbach – Hafiz at the Fountain
- William Powell Frith
  - The Bride of Lammermoor
  - The Rejected Poet
- Jean-Léon Gérôme – The Idyll
- Francis Grant
  - Portrait of Benjamin Disraeli
  - Portrait of Sir Edwin Landseer
  - Portrait of the Duke of Portland
- Hiroshige – Thirty-six Views of Mount Fuji (first publication)
- William Holman Hunt – Our English Coasts, 1852 ('Strayed Sheep')
- George Inness – A Bit of the Roman Aqueduct
- George Jones – Turner's Gallery; the Artist Showing his Work
- Alexander Kotzebue – The Battle of Zorndorf
- Frederic Leighton – The Death of Brunelleschi
- Charles Robert Leslie – Portrait of John Everett Millais
- John Martin – The Destruction of Sodom and Gomorrah
- Robert Braithwaite Martineau – Kit's Writing Lesson

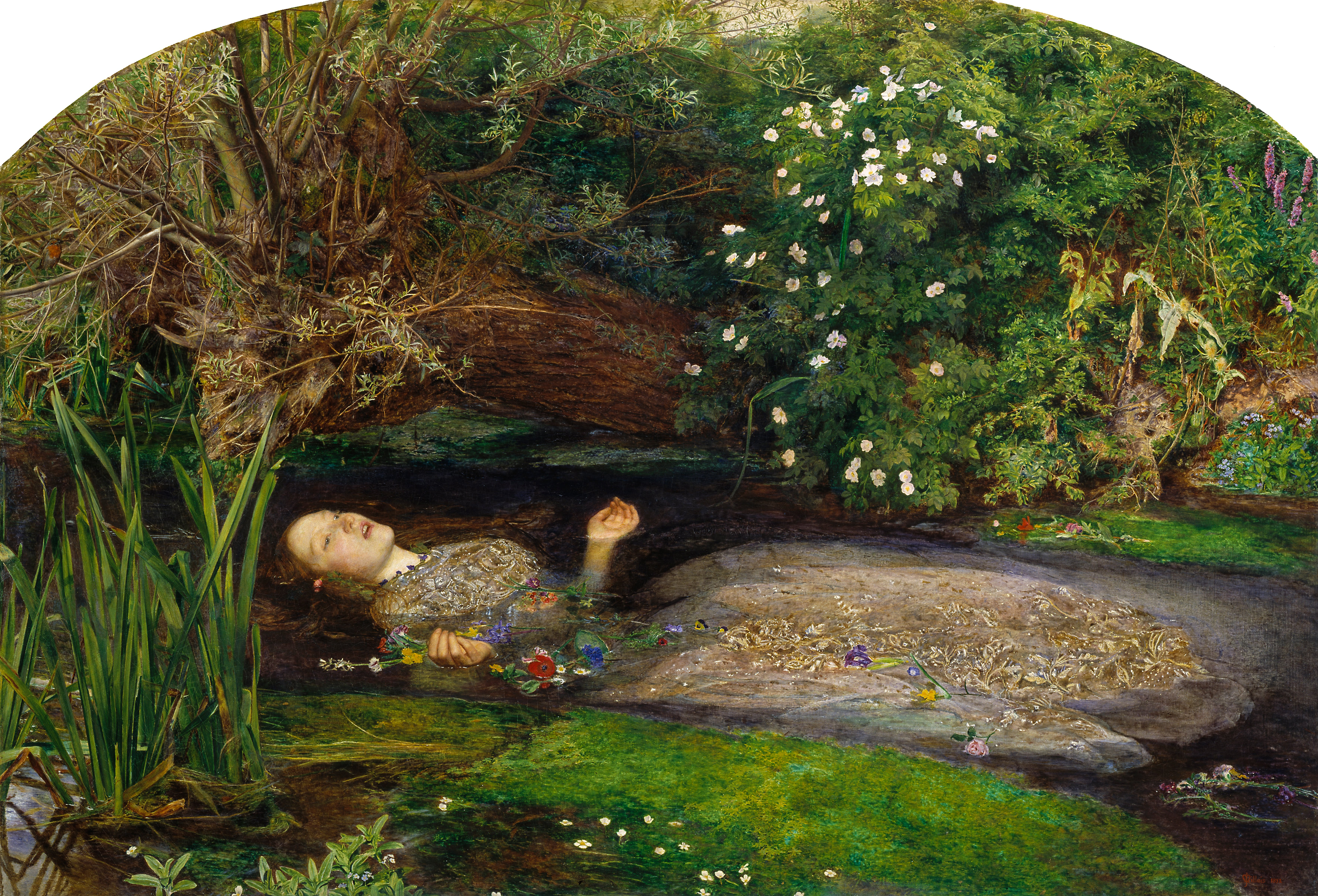
Millais – Ophelia

- John Everett Millais
  - A Huguenot
  - Ophelia
- David Roberts – The Inauguration of the Great Exhibition
- François Rude – Joan of Arc (marble)
- Henry Courtney Selous – The Opening of the Great Exhibition by Queen Victoria
- Clarkson Stanfield – The Harbour of La Rochelle
- John Steell – The Duke of Wellington (equestrian bronze, Edinburgh)
- Thomas Sully -
  - Pocahontas
- Thomas Webster – A Letter from the Colonies
- Frederick August Wenderoth and Charles Christian Nahl – Miners in the Sierras
- Edwin White -
  - Pocahontas Informing John Smith of a Conspiracy of the Indians
- Franz Xaver Winterhalter – The Cousins

== Exhibitions ==
- The Society of Arts holds Exhibition of Recent Specimens of Photography, a photographic exhibition in London, the first of its kind.

== Publications ==
- Edward Lear – Journal of a Landscape Painter in Southern Calabria

== Births ==
- April 1 – Edwin Austin Abbey, American painter and illustrator (died 1911)
- April 12 – Petar Ubavkić, Serbian sculptor and painter (died 1910)
- April 18 – George Clausen, English artist (died 1944)
- May 18 – Gertrude Käsebier, née Stanton, American portrait photographer (died 1934)
- July 27 – Edward Onslow Ford, English sculptor (died 1901)
- September 21 – Edmund Leighton, English historical genre painter (died 1922)

== Deaths ==
- January 1 – Kapiton Pavlov, Russian portrait painter (born 1791)
- February 10 – Samuel Prout, English watercolour painter (born 1783)
- February 24 – John Frazee, first American-born sculptor to execute a bust in marble (born 1790)
- March 9 - Anson Dickinson, American painter of miniature portraits (born 1779)
- April 5 – William Cuming, Irish portrait painter (born 1769)
- May 30 – George Chinnery, English painter working in China (born 1774)
- June 4 – James Pradier, Swiss-born French sculptor in the neoclassical style (born 1790)
- June 11 – Karl Briullov, Russian painter who transitioned from the Russian neoclassicism to romanticism (born 1799)
- July 12 – Pieter Christoffel Wonder, Dutch painter, active in England (born 1780)
- August 4 – Alfred d'Orsay, French painter, sculptor and patron of the arts (born 1801)
- August 14 – Eberhard Georg Friedrich von Wächter, German painter (born 1762)
- September 14 – Augustus Pugin, English architect, illustrator and designer (born 1812)
- September 20 – William Finden, English engraver (born 1787)
- September 23 – John Vanderlyn, American painter in the neoclassical style (born 1775)
- October 17 – Henri Decaisne, Belgian historical and portrait painter (born 1799)
- October 26 – Johann Erdmann Hummel, German painter (born 1769)
- October 29 – Étienne-Jules Ramey, French sculptor and teacher (born 1796)
- December 18 – Horatio Greenough, American sculptor (born 1805)
