= Portrait of Benjamin Disraeli =

Portrait of Benjamin Disraeli may refer to:

- Portrait of Benjamin Disraeli (Grant), an 1852 painting by Francis Grant
- Portrait of Benjamin Disraeli (Millais), an 1881 painting by John Everett Millais
