= Blackheath Park (painting) =

Painting by William Mulready

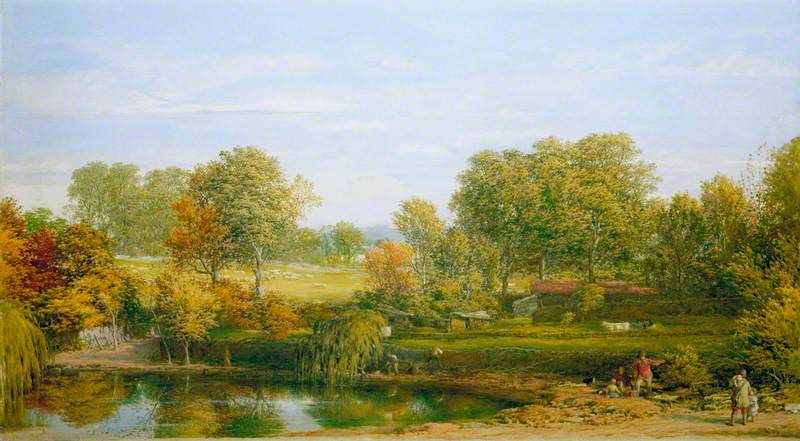
- Artist: William Mulready
- Year: 1852
- Type: Oil on panel, landscape painting
- Dimensions: 34.3 cm × 61 cm (13.5 in × 24 in)
- Location: Victoria and Albert Museum, London

Blackheath Park is an oil on panel landscape painting by the Irish artist William Mulready, from 1852. It is held at the Victoria and Albert Museum, in London.

== History and description ==
It features a view of Blackheath in Kent then on the outskirts of London. The businessman and noted art collector John Sheepshanks was a patron and friend of Mulready and owned a number of his paintings. He may have begun this painting as early as 1832, but it was later described by The Art Journal as having a Pre-Raphaelite style to it similar to May, in the Regent's Park by Charles Allston Collins.

This view of Blackheath Park is seen from the gateway of his residence there. The picture was as displayed at the Royal Academy Exhibition of 1852 held at the National Gallery, where it was praised by one critic as "a refreshing green bit of nature". It was part of the Sheepshanks Gift given in 1857 to the newly-founded Victoria and Albert Museum, in South Kensington.

== Bibliography ==
- Barringer, Tim (ed.) Writing the Pre-Raphaelites: Text, Context, Subtext. Taylor & Francis, 2017.
- Roe, Sonia. Oil Paintings in Public Ownership in the Victoria and Albert Museum. Public Catalogue Foundation, 2008.
