= Hughenden Manor =

Grade I listed house in Buckinghamshire, United Kingdom

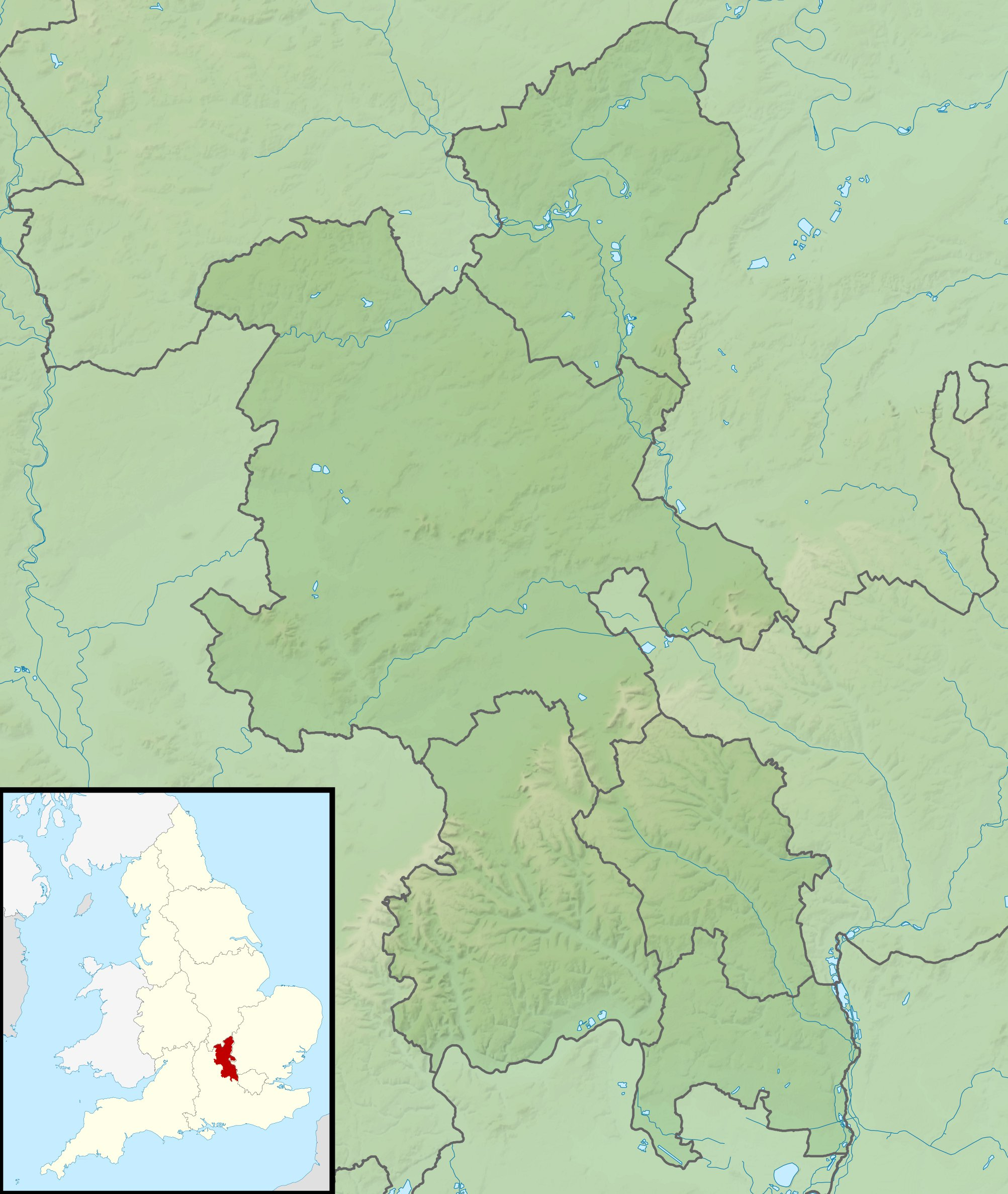
- Location within Buckinghamshire
- 51.6502°N 0.7566°W
- Type: House
- Location: High Wycombe, Buckinghamshire

History
- Built: 18th and 19th centuries

Site notes
- Architect: Edward Buckton Lamb
- Architectural style: Jacobethan
- Owner: National Trust

Listed Building – Grade I
- Official name: Hughenden Manor
- Designated: 21 June 1955
- Reference no.: 1125785

Listed Building – Grade II
- Official name: Stable Block and Attached Garden Walls at Hughenden Manor
- Designated: 4 July 1985
- Reference no.: 1332071

National Register of Historic Parks and Gardens
- Official name: Hughenden Manor Park and Garden
- Designated: 30 July 1987
- Reference no.: 1000318

Hughenden Manor, Hughenden, Buckinghamshire, England, is a Victorian mansion, with earlier origins, that served as the country house of the Prime Minister, Benjamin Disraeli, 1st Earl of Beaconsfield. It is now owned by the National Trust and open to the public. It sits on the brow of the hill to the west of the main A4128 road that links Hughenden to High Wycombe.

== History ==
The manor of Hughenden is first recorded in 1086, as part of Queen Edith's lands, and held by William, son of Odo the Bishop of Bayeux, and was assessed for tax at 10 hides. After his forfeiture, the lands were held by the Crown, until Henry I of England gave the lands to his chamberlain and treasurer, Geoffrey de Clinton. Clinton, whose main home was in Kenilworth, Warwickshire, had the lands tenanted by Geoffrey de Sancto Roerio, who resultantly changed his surname to the Anglicised Hughenden. After passing through that family, with successive kings having to confirm the gift of the lands, the manor returned to the Crown in the 14th century. In 1539, the Crown granted the manor and lands to Sir Robert Dormer, and it passed through his family until 1737 when it was sold by Philip Stanhope, 4th Earl of Chesterfield to Charles Savage.

After passing through his extended family following a series of deaths and resultant devises by will, by 1816 the manor and lands were owned by John Norris, a distinguished antiquary and scholar. Isaac D'Israeli, the father of Benjamin Disraeli, Prime Minister of the United Kingdom (1868 and 1874–1880, and Earl of Beaconsfield 1876), had for some time rented the nearby Bradenham Manor and, following Norris's death in 1845, bought the manor and lands from his executors in 1847. The purchase was supported with the help of a loan of £25,000 (equivalent to almost £1,500,000 today) from Lord Henry Bentinck and Lord Titchfield. This was because at the time, as Disraeli was the leader of the Conservative Party, "it was essential to represent a county," and county members had to be landowners. Taking ownership of the manor on the death of his father in 1848, Disraeli and his wife Mary Anne, alternated between Hughenden and several homes in London.

Hughenden Manor, the entrance façade

Lady Beaconsfield died in 1872, and Disraeli in 1881; both were buried in a vault adjacent in the churchyard of St Michael and All Angels Church which is situated downhill from the main house to the east. The church contains a memorial to the Earl erected by Queen Victoria: the only instance of a reigning British monarch ever erecting a memorial to a subject.

Disraeli had no children; he left Hughenden to his nephew, Coningsby Disraeli. However, as Coningsby was only 14 at the time, his trustees rented out the property until he came into his inheritance in 1888. When Coningsby died in 1936, his widow left Hughenden, and the following year Disraeli's niece sold the house to W H Abbey, who vested it, with the remaining contents and 189 acres (76 ha), in the Disraelian Society.

During the Second World War, the basement at Hughenden Manor was used as a secret intelligence base code named "Hillside". The UK Air Ministry staff at the manor analysed aerial photography of Germany and created maps for bombing missions, including the "Dambusters" raid.

In 1947, the Abbey family and the Disraelian Society made Hughenden over to the National Trust. In 1955, it was designated a Grade I listed building. The gardens are also listed as Grade II on the Register of Historic Parks and Gardens. It is decorated as it might have been at the time it was occupied by Disraeli. It contains a collection of memorabilia including family portraits, Disraeli's own furnishings, a library including a collection of Disraeli's novels and one written and signed by Queen Victoria along with many of the books he inherited from his father, Isaac D'Israeli.

The park and woodlands total almost 1,500 acres (610 ha). The formal garden which was designed by Lady Beaconsfield (Queen Victoria created Mary Anne a Viscountess in her own right in 1868), has been restored to a similar condition to when occupied by the Disraelis. The long terrace at the rear of the house is decorated with Florentine vases. A monument on a nearby hill, visible from the house, was erected by Mary Anne in 1862 in memory of her father-in-law.

In May 2024 the house was the featured in an episode the BBC documentary series Hidden Treasures of the National Trust.

== Architecture and description ==
Disraeli's first-floor study

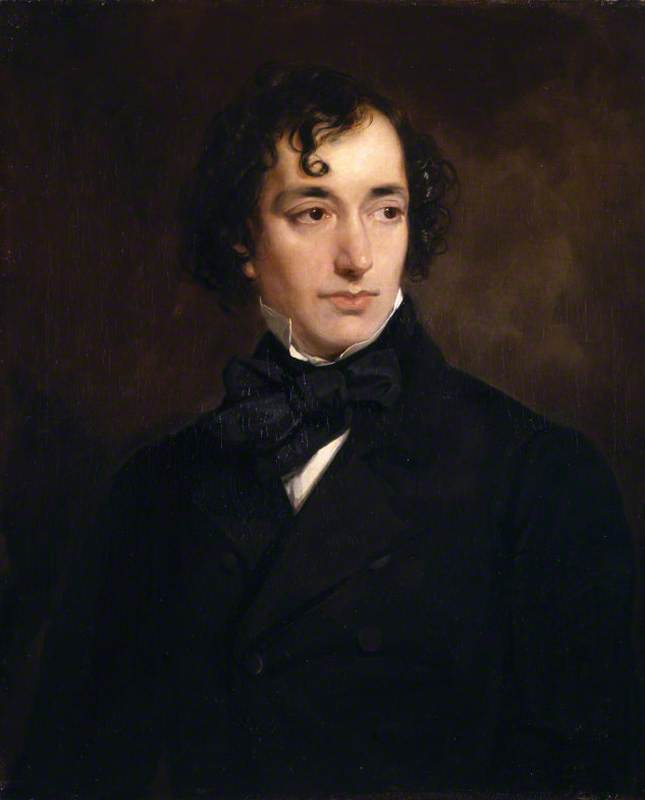
Portrait of Benjamin Disraeli by Francis Grant, 1852

The present house was built towards the end of the 18th century and was of a stuccoed and unassuming design. However, in 1862 the Disraelis had the house remodelled by the architect Edward Buckton Lamb. Lamb has been described as "one of the most perverse and original of mid-Victorian architects". Architecturally, he had a strong interest in the eclectic; this interest is very apparent in his work at Hughenden. Under Lamb's hand, classical Georgian features were swept away as he "dramatised" the house. Lamb worked in a hybrid baronial form of Gothic architecture, with exposed and angular juxtaposing brickwork surmounted by stepped battlements with diagonal pinnacles. The uppermost windows of the thirteen-bayed garden façade were given unusual pediments – appearing almost as machicolations. The architectural historian Nikolaus Pevsner, in his highly critical appraisal of Lamb's work at Hughenden, labels these "window-heads" as "indescribable" and Lamb's overall Hughenden work as "excruciating".

Pevsner clearly failed to appreciate what the delighted Disraeli described as the "romance he had been many years realising" while going to say that he imagined it was now "restored to what it was before the civil war". As the house was not originally constructed until the middle of the 18th century, almost a century after the Civil War, that scenario would have been difficult.

The house is of three floors. The reception rooms are all on the ground floor, most with large plate glass windows (a Victorian innovation) giving onto the south-facing terrace overlooking a grassy parterre with views over the Hughenden Valley.

The west wing was built in 1910, long after Disraeli's death, when the house was in the ownership of his nephew, the politician Coningsby Disraeli.

== Sources ==
- Porter, Darwin; Prince, Danforth (2006). Frommer's England. Frommer's. ISBN 0-7645-9540-7.
- Blake, Robert (1966). Disraeli. London: Eyre & Spottiswoode. OCLC 1138916232.
- Pevsner, Nikolaus; Williamson, Elizabeth (2003). Buckinghamshire. The Buildings of England. New Haven US and London: Yale University Press. ISBN 9780300095845. OCLC 1204460755.
- Garnett, Oliver (2009) [1997]. Hughenden Manor. The National Trust. ISBN 978-1-84359-173-3.
