= Earl of Beaconsfield =

Extinct earldom in the Peerage of the United Kingdom

Earldom of Beaconsfield
- Arms of Disraeli Blazon Arms: Per saltire gules and argent a castle triple-towered in chief argent two lions rampant in fess sable and an eagle displayed in base or. Crest: Issuant from a wreath of oak proper a castle triple-towered argent. Supporters: Dexter an eagle Or sinister a lion Or each gorged with a collar Gules and pendent therefrom an escutcheon of the last charged with a tower Argent. Motto: Forti Nihili Difficile
- Creation date: August 1876
- Created by: Queen Victoria
- Peerage: Peerage of the United Kingdom
- First holder: Benjamin Disraeli
- Last holder: Benjamin Disraeli
- Remainder to: none
- Subsidiary titles: Viscount Hughenden
- Status: Extinct
- Motto: FORTI NIHIL DIFFICILE (Nothing is difficult to the strong)

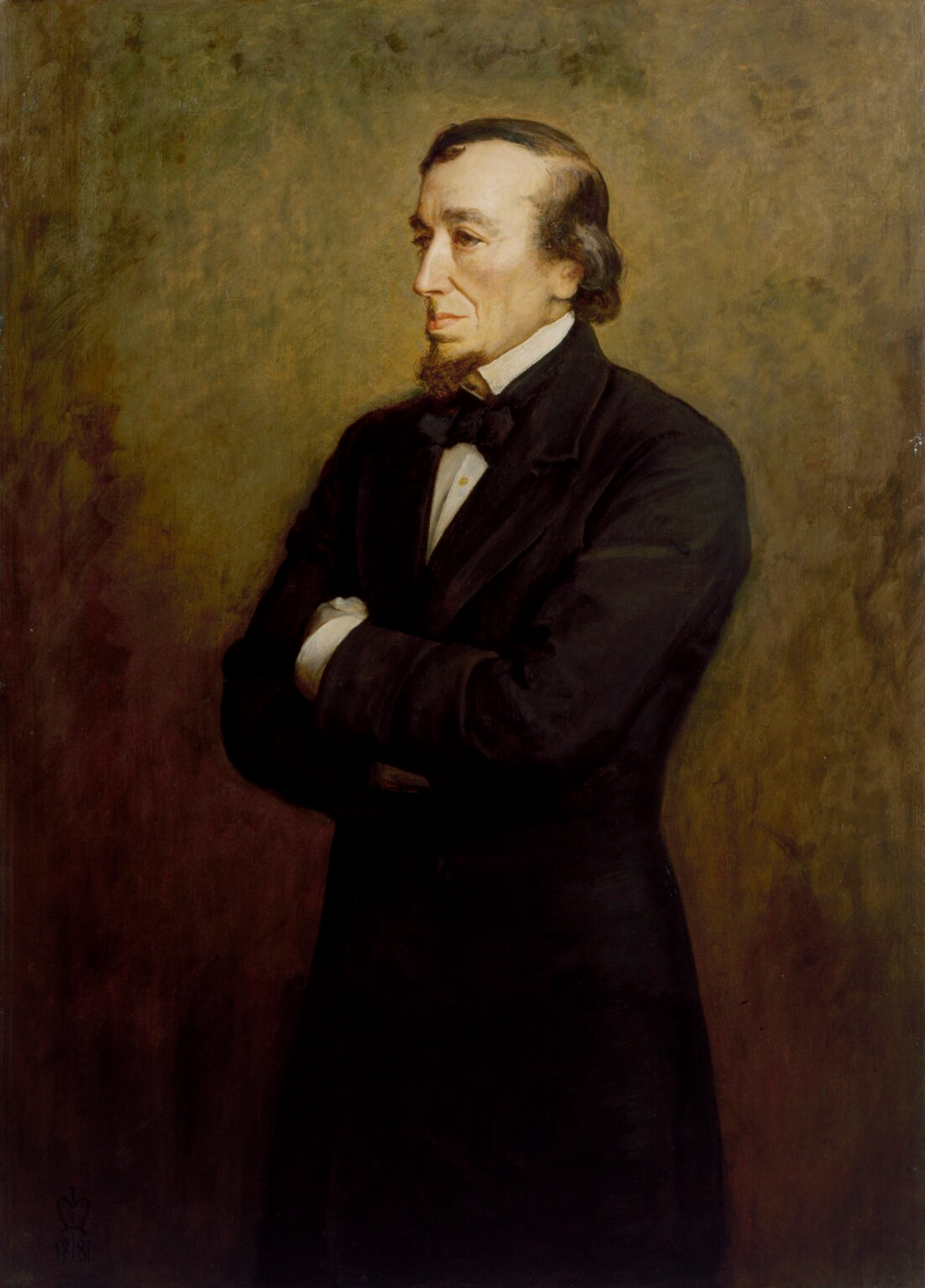
Portrait of Benjamin Disraeli by John Everett Millais

Earl of Beaconsfield, of Hughenden in the County of Buckingham, was a title in the Peerage of the United Kingdom. It was created in 1876 for Prime Minister Benjamin Disraeli, a favourite of Queen Victoria. Victoria favoured Disraeli's Tory policies over those of his Liberal rival, William Ewart Gladstone. Disraeli had also promoted the Royal Titles Act 1876 that had given Victoria the title of Empress of India. The subsidiary title of the earldom was Viscount Hughenden, of Hughenden in the County of Buckingham, also in the Peerage of the United Kingdom.

In 1868, at the end of his first term as prime minister, Disraeli's wife Mary had been created Viscountess Beaconsfield, of Beaconsfield in the County of Buckingham, in her own right, allowing her husband to remain a member of the House of Commons. Lady Beaconsfield died in 1872. When Disraeli became an earl in 1876 he automatically lost his seat in the Commons but remained prime minister, leading his government from the House of Lords.

Beaconsfield is the name of a town in the county of Buckinghamshire. For most of his parliamentary career, Disraeli served as a member for Buckinghamshire. He owned an estate, Hughenden Manor, in the nearby town of High Wycombe, but never lived in Beaconsfield. His choice of title might have been partly influenced by the fact that in 1794 the conservative political philosopher and parliamentarian Edmund Burke, whom Disraeli admired, had turned down King George III's offer to raise him to the peerage as Lord Beaconsfield. Disraeli included a fictional Lord Beaconsfield as a character in his first novel, Vivian Grey.

In 1878, Disraeli refused Queen Victoria's offer to make him a duke, accepting instead membership in the Order of the Garter. The Disraelis died without direct heirs and their titles became extinct; Hughenden Manor passed to Lord Beaconsfield's nephew Coningsby Disraeli.

== Viscountess Beaconsfield (1868) ==
- Mary Anne Disraeli, 1st Viscountess Beaconsfield (1792–1872)

== Earls of Beaconsfield (1876) ==
- Benjamin Disraeli, 1st Earl of Beaconsfield (1804–1881)
