= The Harbour of La Rochelle =

Painting by Clarkson Stanfield

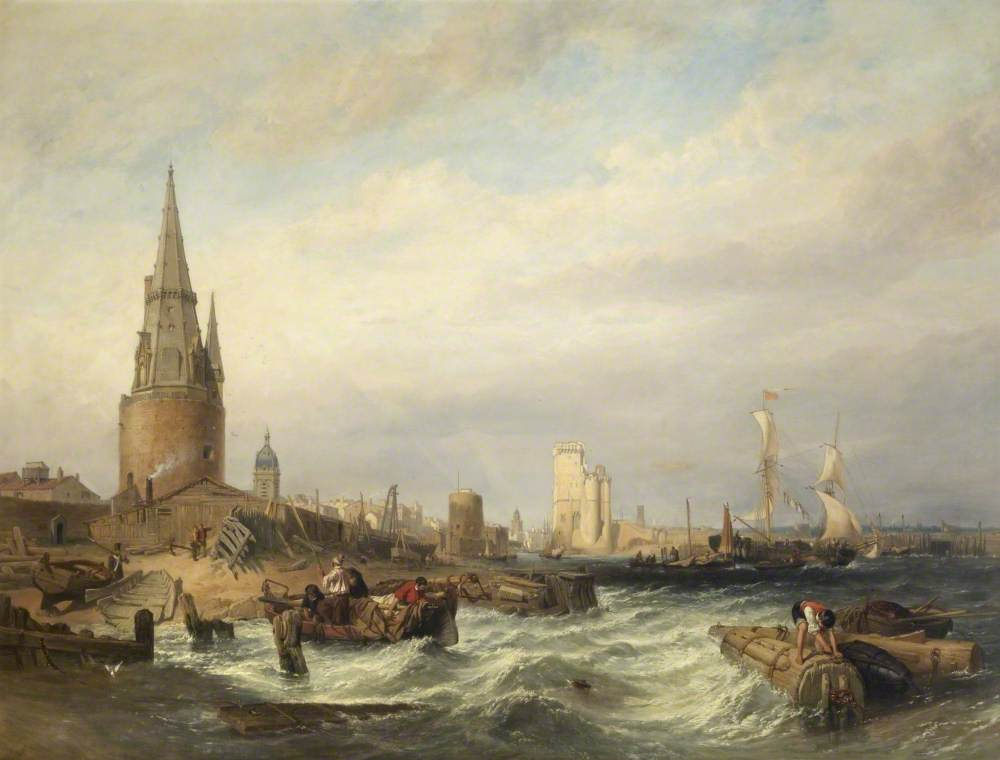
- Artist: Clarkson Stanfield
- Year: 1852
- Type: Oil on canvas, landscape painting
- Dimensions: 129.5 cm × 178.5 cm (51.0 in × 70.3 in)
- Location: Walker Art Gallery, Liverpool

The Harbour of La Rochelle is an 1852 landscape painting by the British artist Clarkson Stanfield. It features a view of the Atlantic port of La Rochelle in western France. Stanfield likely visited La Rochelle in the autumn of 1851 en route to Southern France and Spain.

The painting was displayed at the Royal Academy Exhibition of 1852 at the National Gallery in London. It was praised with The Times comparing it favourably with the eighteenth century French painter Joseph Vernet's depiction of the city in his Views of the Ports of France while the critic of The Art Journal praised it for "masterly execution and sweetness of colour". Today the picture is in the collection of the Walker Art Gallery in Liverpool, having been acquired in 1932.

== Bibliography ==
- Van der Merwe, Pieter & Took, Roger. The Spectacular career of Clarkson Stanfield. Tyne and Wear County Council Museums, 1979.
- Wright, Christopher, Gordon, Catherine May & Smith, Mary Peskett. British and Irish Paintings in Public Collections: An Index of British and Irish Oil Paintings by Artists Born Before 1870 in Public and Institutional Collections in the United Kingdom and Ireland. Yale University Press, 2006.
