= The Death of Brunelleschi =

Painting by Frederic Leighton

- Artist: Frederic Leighton
- Year: 1852
- Type: Oil on canvas, history painting
- Dimensions: 287 cm × 227 cm (113 in × 89 in)
- Location: Leighton House, London

The Death of Brunelleschi is an 1852 history painting by the British artist Frederic Leighton. It depicts the last moments of Filippo Brunelleschi, the celebrated Renaissance architect. In the background is the dome of Florence Cathedral designed by Brunelleschi. Leighton based on the work on the writings of Giorgio Vasari. It was produced at the end of his time as a student at the Städelsches Kunstinstitut in Frankfurt where he had been studying since 1846. Such death scenes of major historical figures were popular in the Victorian era.

The painting was displayed at the Royal Academy Exhibition of 1852 held at the National Gallery in London. It is now part of the collection of Leighton House.

== Bibliography ==
- Cast, David (ed.) The Ashgate Research Companion to Giorgio Vasari. Ashgate Publishing, 2014.
- Fraser, Hilary (ed.) The Collected Works of Walter Pater, Volume I: The Renaissance. Oxford University Press, 2025.
- Kestner, Joseph A. Masculinities in Victorian Painting. Scolar Press, 1985.
- Lambourne, Michael. Victorian Painting. Phaidon, 1999.
