= A Letter from the Colonies =

Painting by Thomas Webster

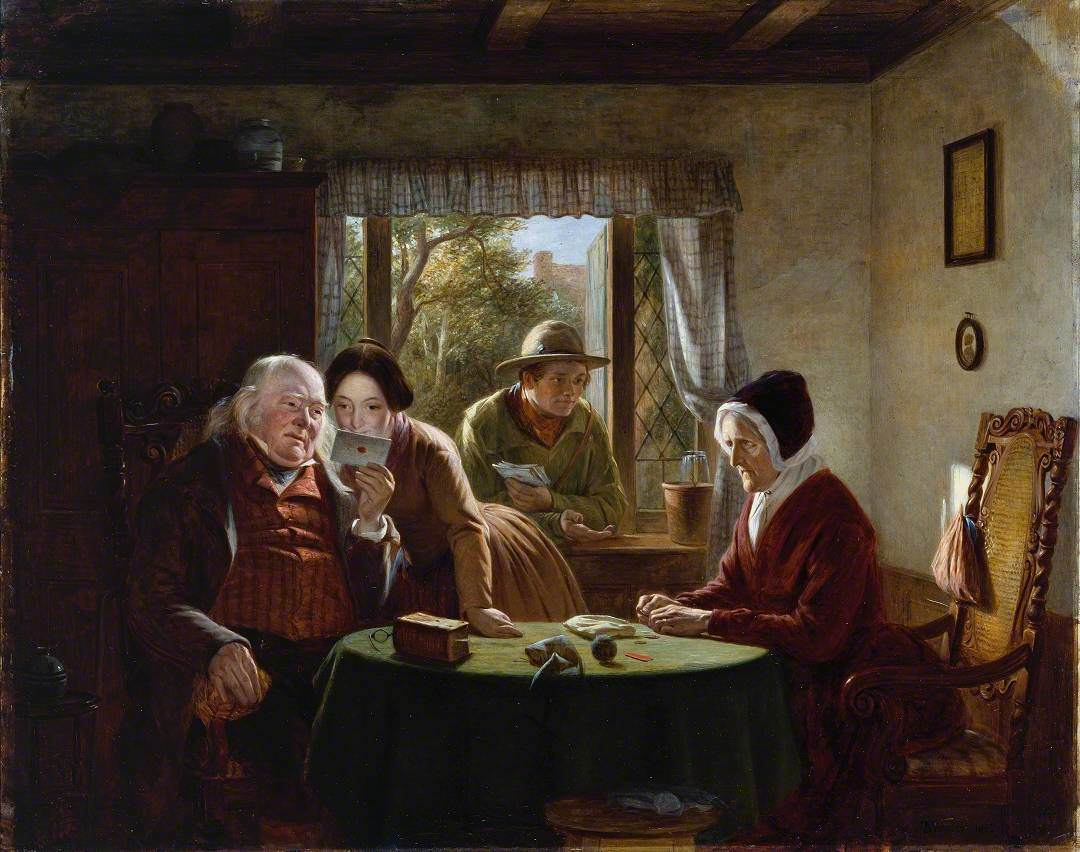
- Artist: Thomas Webster
- Year: 1852
- Type: Oil on panel, genre painting
- Dimensions: 41.3 cm × 52.1 cm (16.3 in × 20.5 in)
- Location: Tate Britain, London

A Letter from the Colonies is an 1852 oil painting by the British artist Thomas Webster. It shows a family in rural England holding recently delivered letter, bearing news of a relative who has emigrated to the colonies, possibly to Australia or elsewhere. They approach it with some trepidation, unsure of its contents.

Webster became known for producing smaller genre paintings that paid homage to the Old Masters of the Dutch Golden Age during the Seventeenth Century. Along with his protégé Frederick Daniel Hardy he ibfluenfed the Cranbrook Colony of artists in Kent, who specialised in producing similar scenes of everyday life.

The painting was displayed at the Royal Academy Exhibition of 1852 held at the National Gallery in London. Today it is in the collection of the Tate Britain, having been purchased in 1955.

== Bibliography ==
- Thomas, Jane. Victorian Narrative Painting. Harry N. Abrams, 2000.
- Shaikh, Fariha. Nineteenth-century Settler Emigration in British Literature and Art. Edinburgh University Press, 2018.
- Thompson, Carol (ed.) The Cranbrook Colony: Fresh Perspectives. Wolverhampton Art Gallery, 2010.
