= Royal Academy Exhibition of 1852 =

1852 art exhibition in London

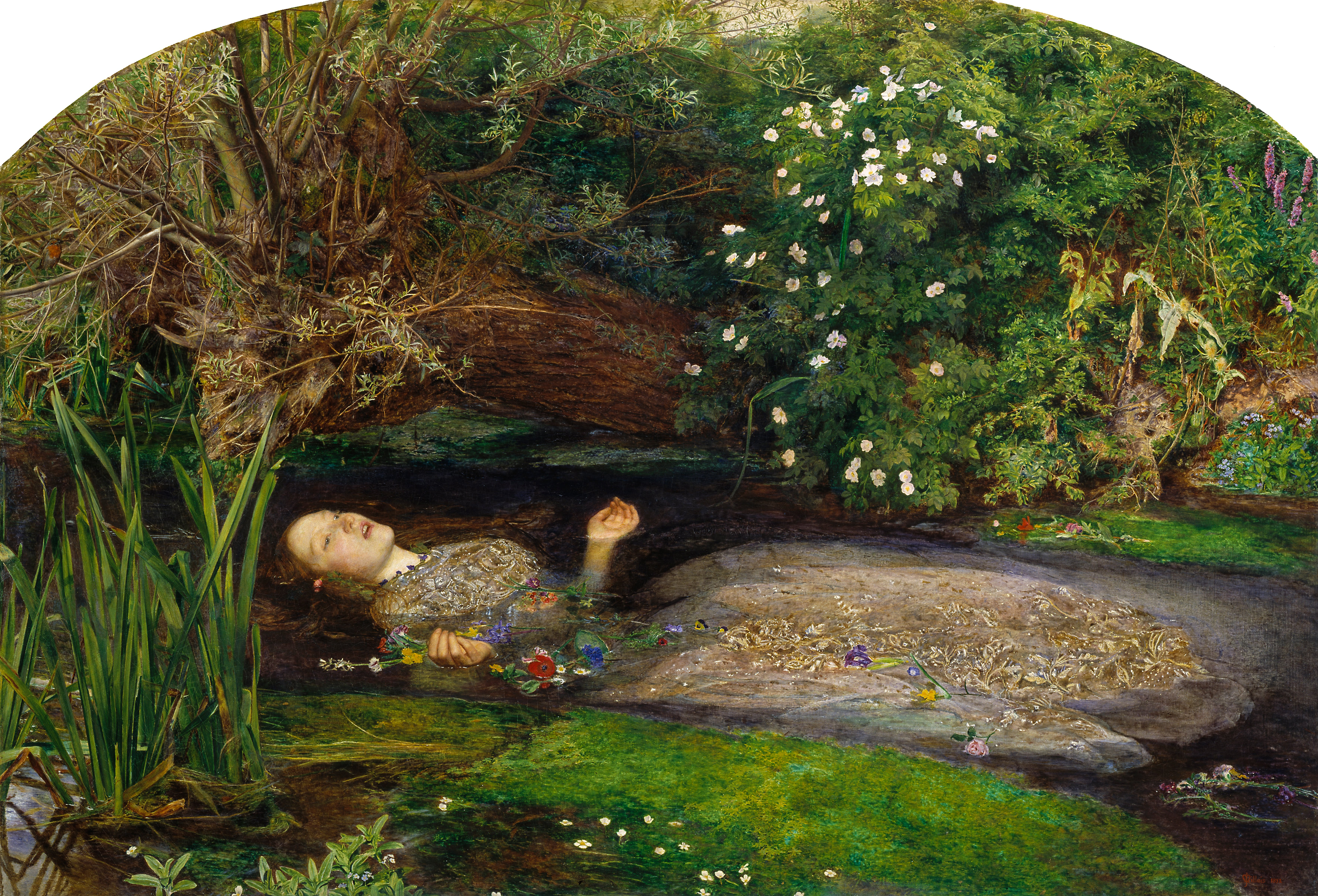
Ophelia by John Everett Millais

The Royal Academy Exhibition of 1852 was the eighty forth annual Summer Exhibition of the British Royal Academy of Arts. It was held at the National Gallery in London from 3 May to 24 July 1852 during the Victorian era.

It was the first exhibition to be held since the death of J. M. W. Turner, which was noted in several reviews. To some extent 1852 marked a changing of the guard, with the deaths of Turner and William Etty and the absence of established figures such as the President of the Royal Academy Charles Lock Eastlake and Edwin Landseer openining the way for younger painters, although the prominent Irish artist Daniel Maclise exhibited a large history painting featuring Alfred the Great. This led to the growing prominence of artists associated with the Pre-Raphaelite Brotherhood William Holman Hunt and John Everett Millais and Ford Madox Brown, several of whose paintings had been painted outdoors in a major departure from standard practice.

Holman Hunt produced The Hireling Shepherd while Millais enjoyed success with Ophelia and A Huguenot while Madox Brown The Pretty Baa-Lambs/ Millais also submitted a portrait of Emily Augusta Patmore. Other portraits on display included Francis Grant's Portrait of the Young Disraeli.

== Gallery ==
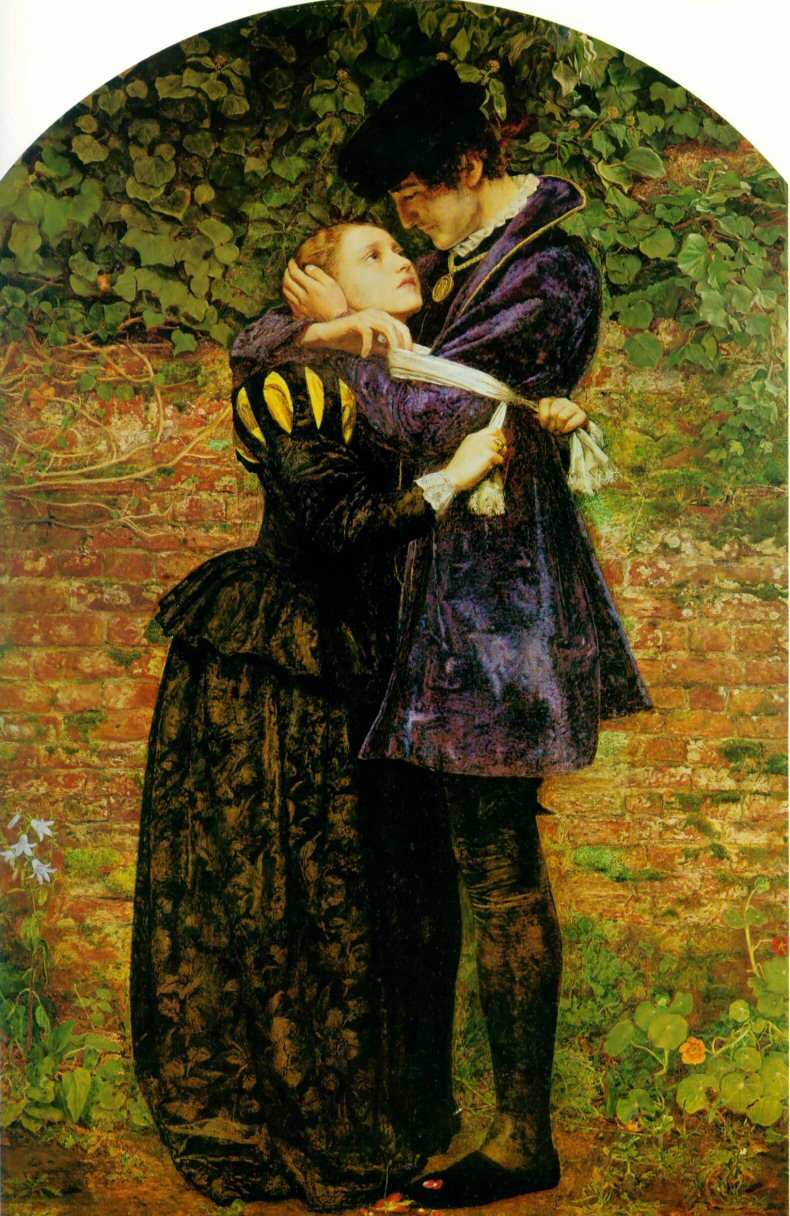
A Huguenot by John Everett Millais

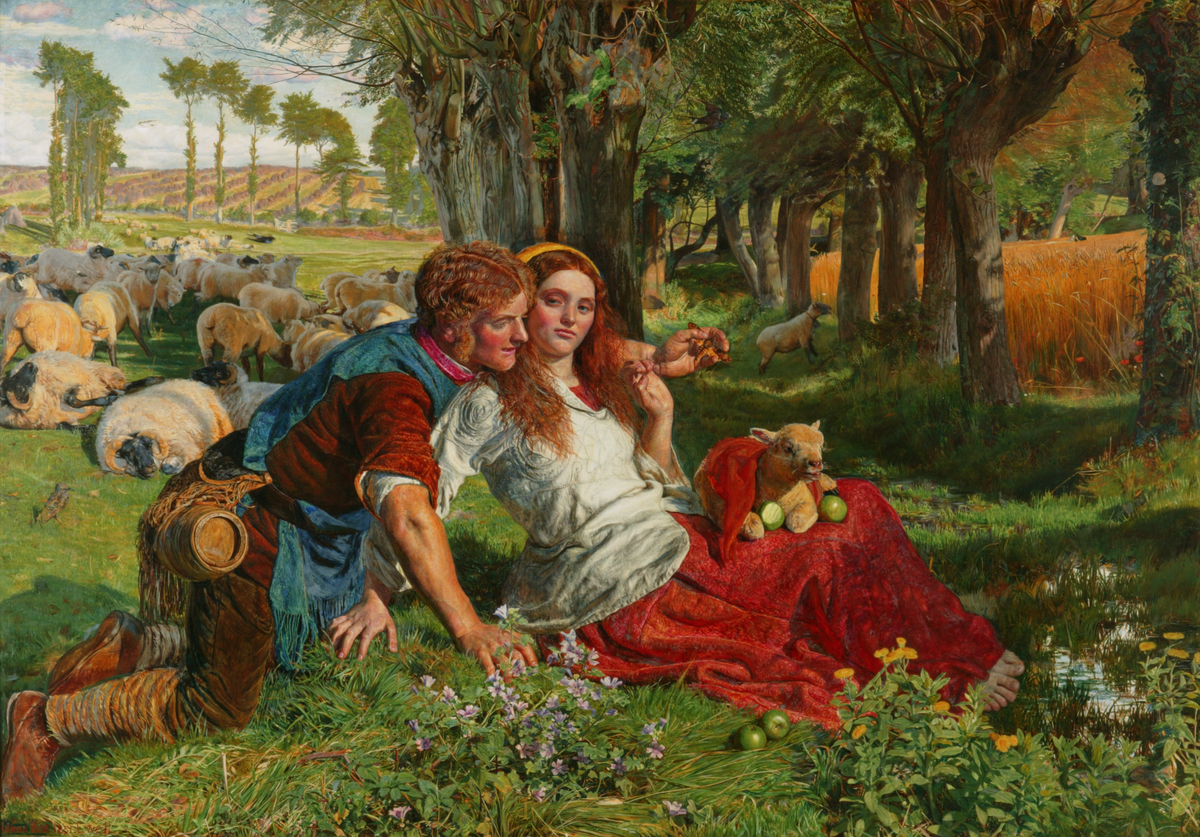
The Hireling Shepherd by William Holman Hunt

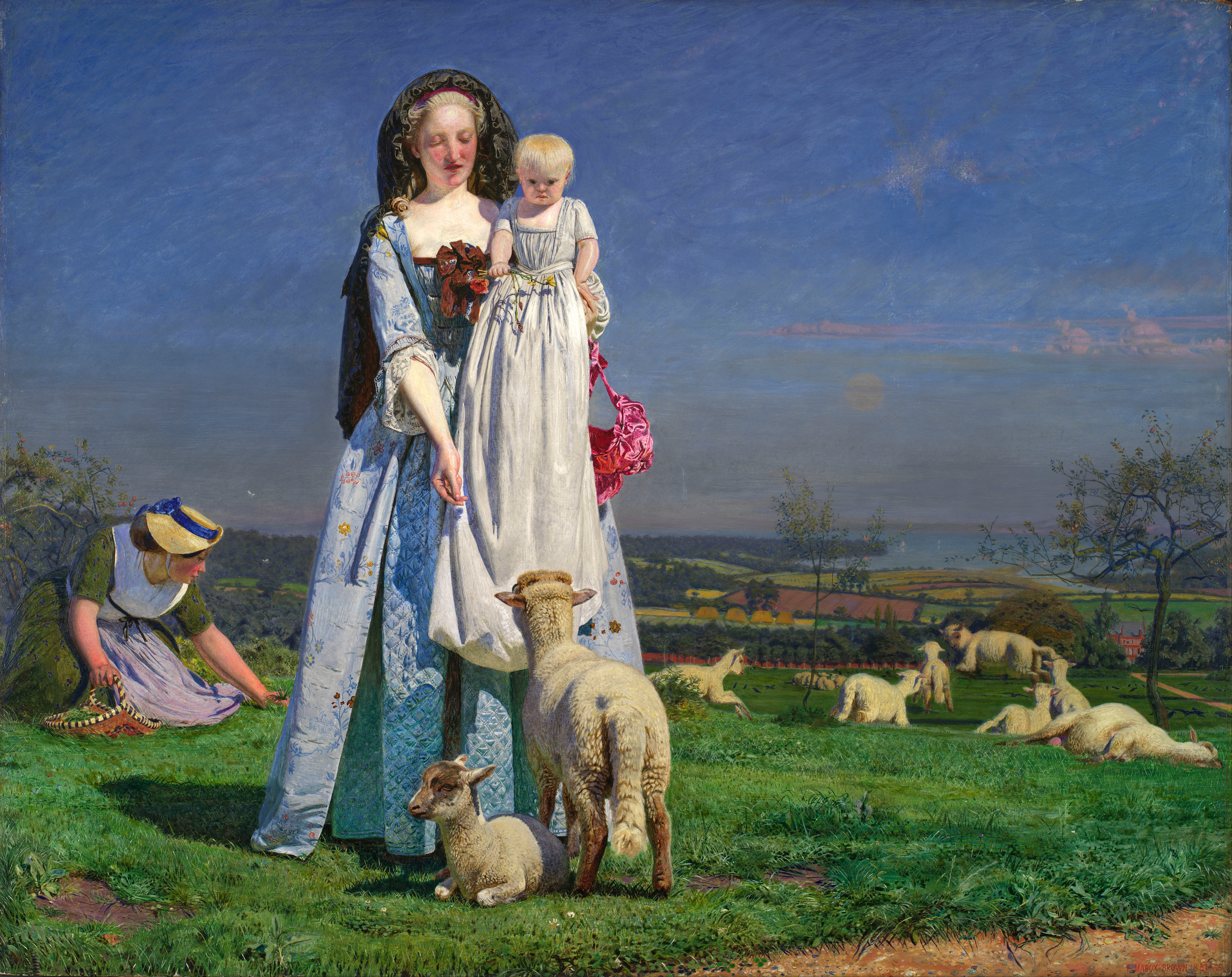
The Pretty Baa-Lambs by Ford Madox Brown

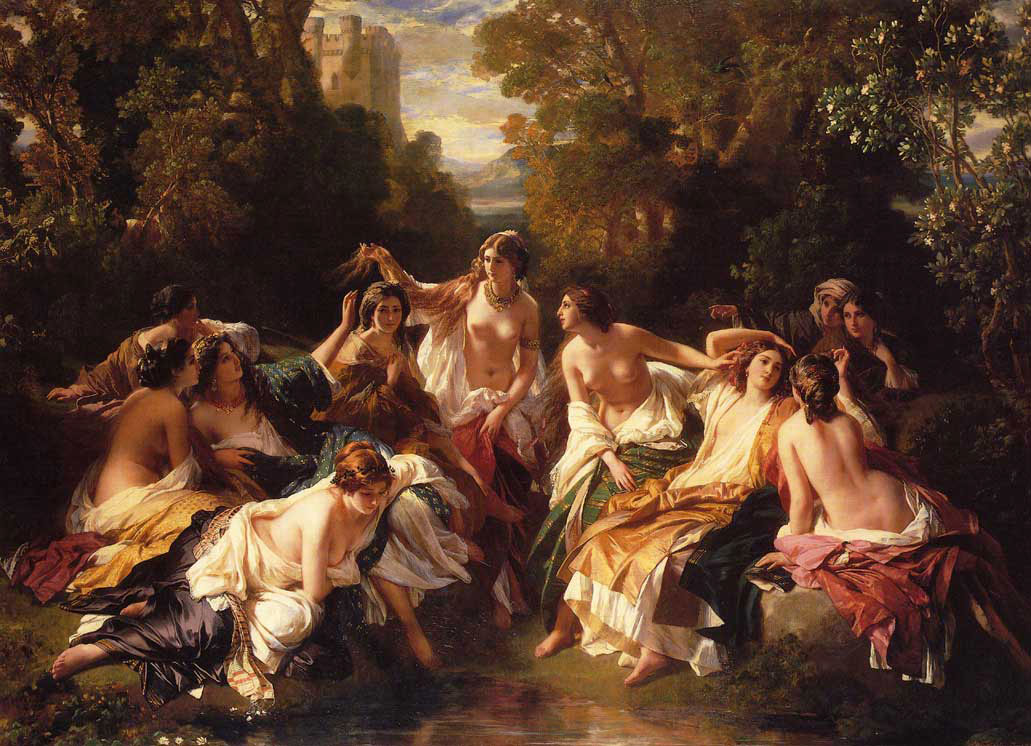
Florinda by Franz Xaver Winterhalter

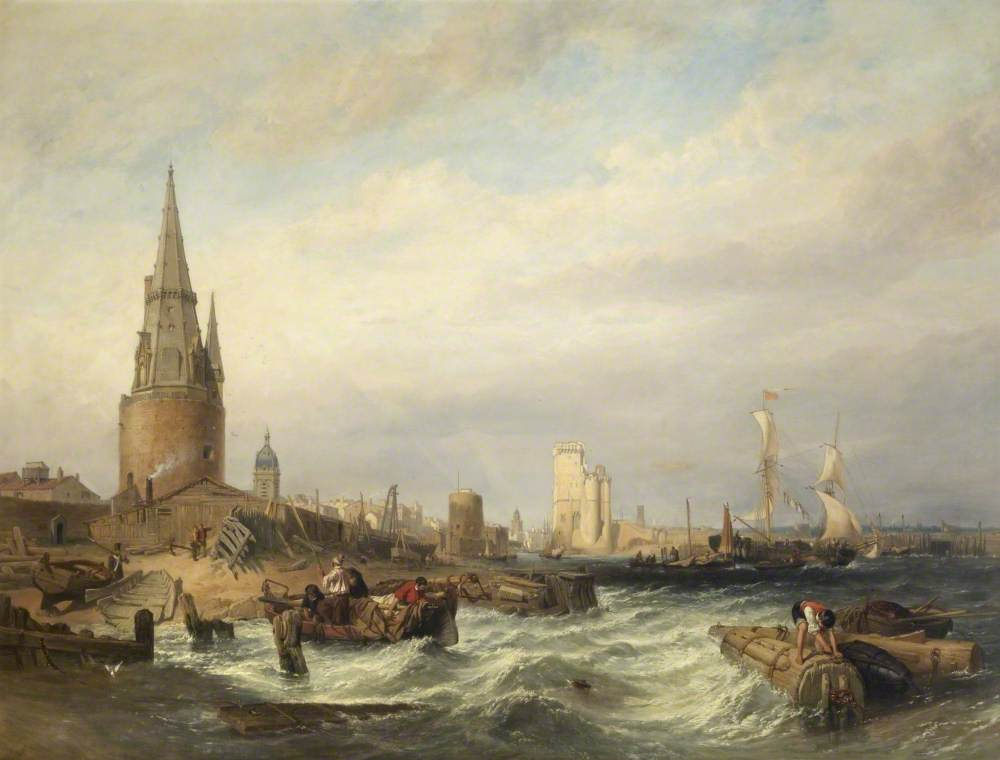
The Harbour of La Rochelle by Clarkson Stanfield

Antwerp by David Roberts

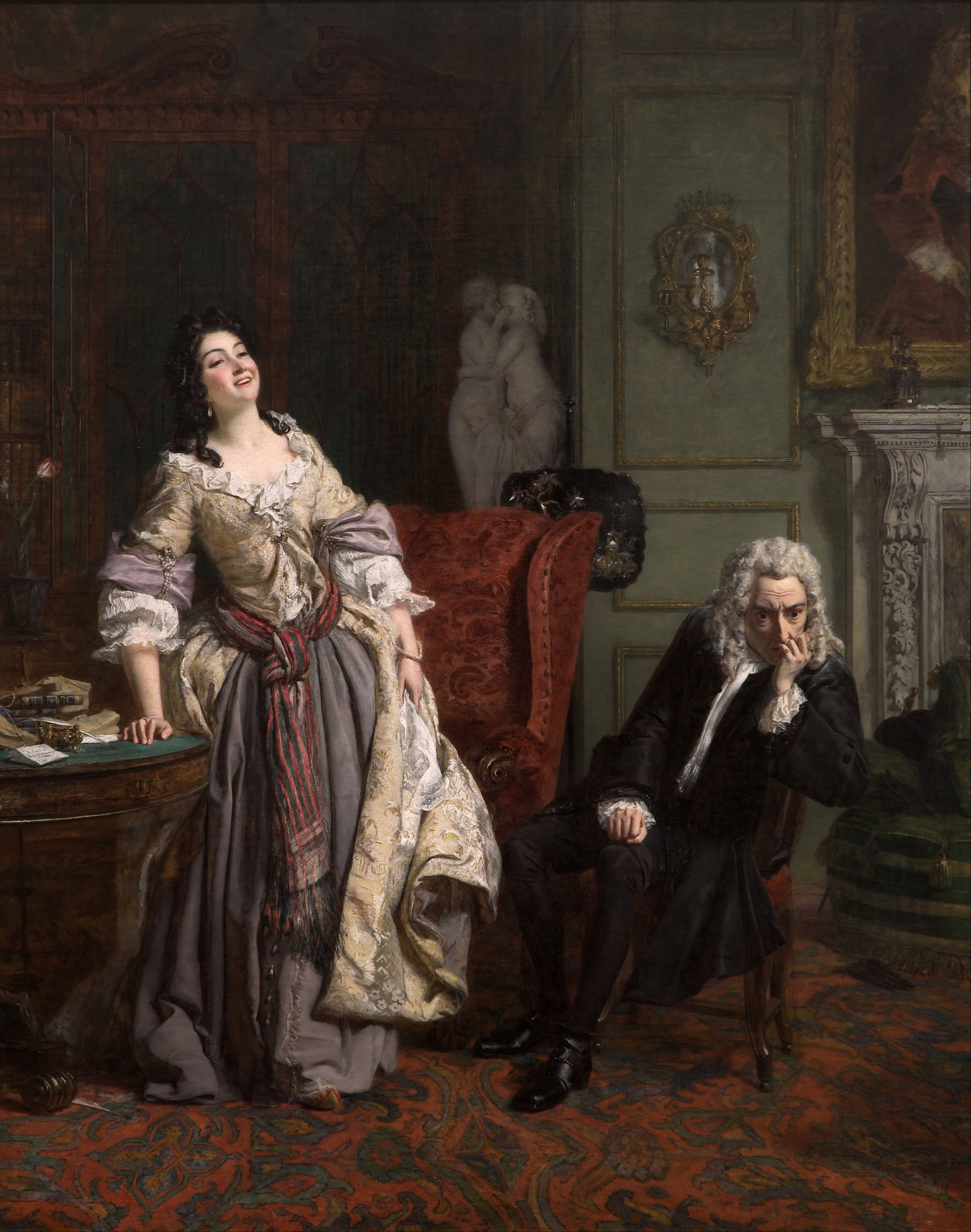
The Rejected Poet by William Powell Frith

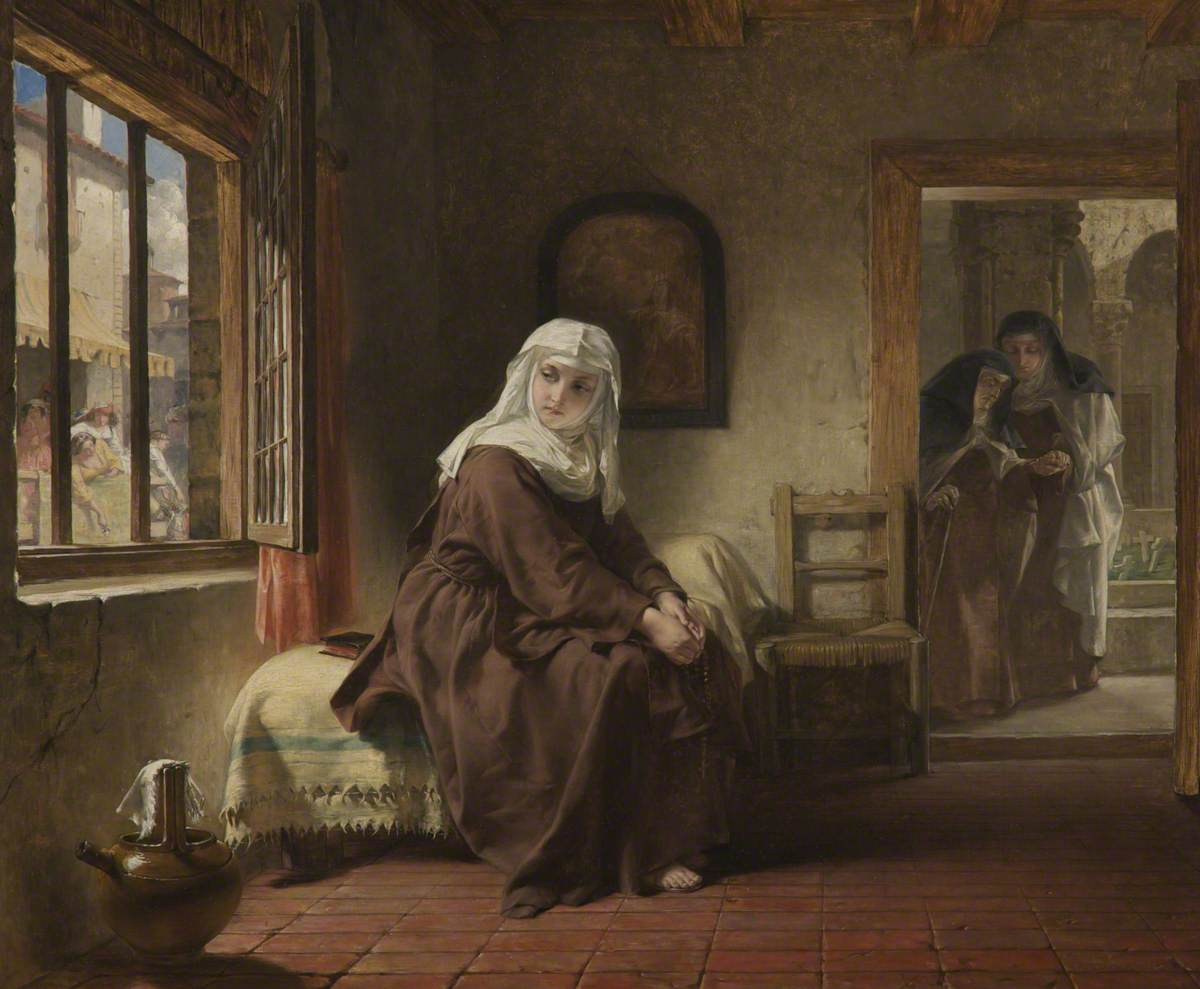
The Novice by Alfred Elmore

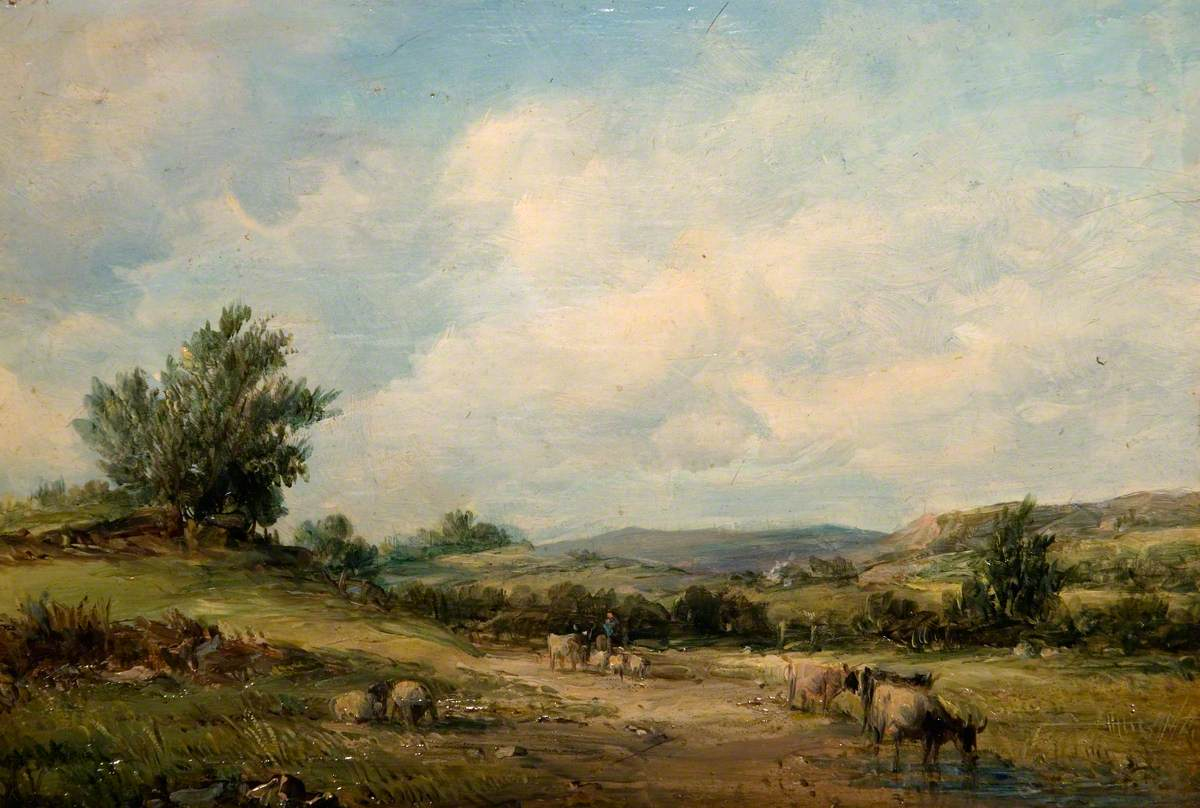
In the Vale of Neath by Alfred Vickers

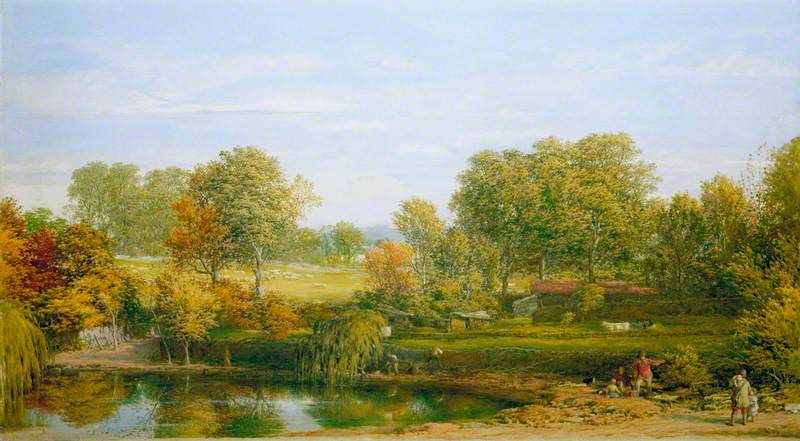
Blackheath Park by William Mulready

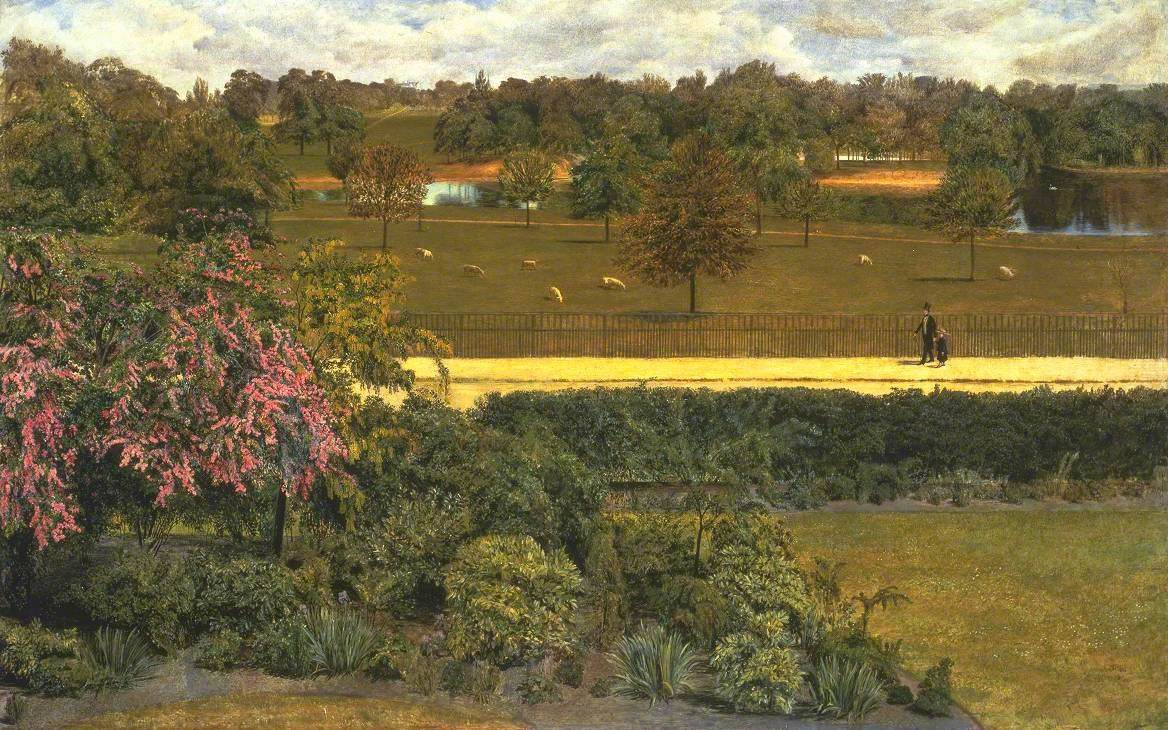
May, in the Regent's Park by Charles Allston Collins

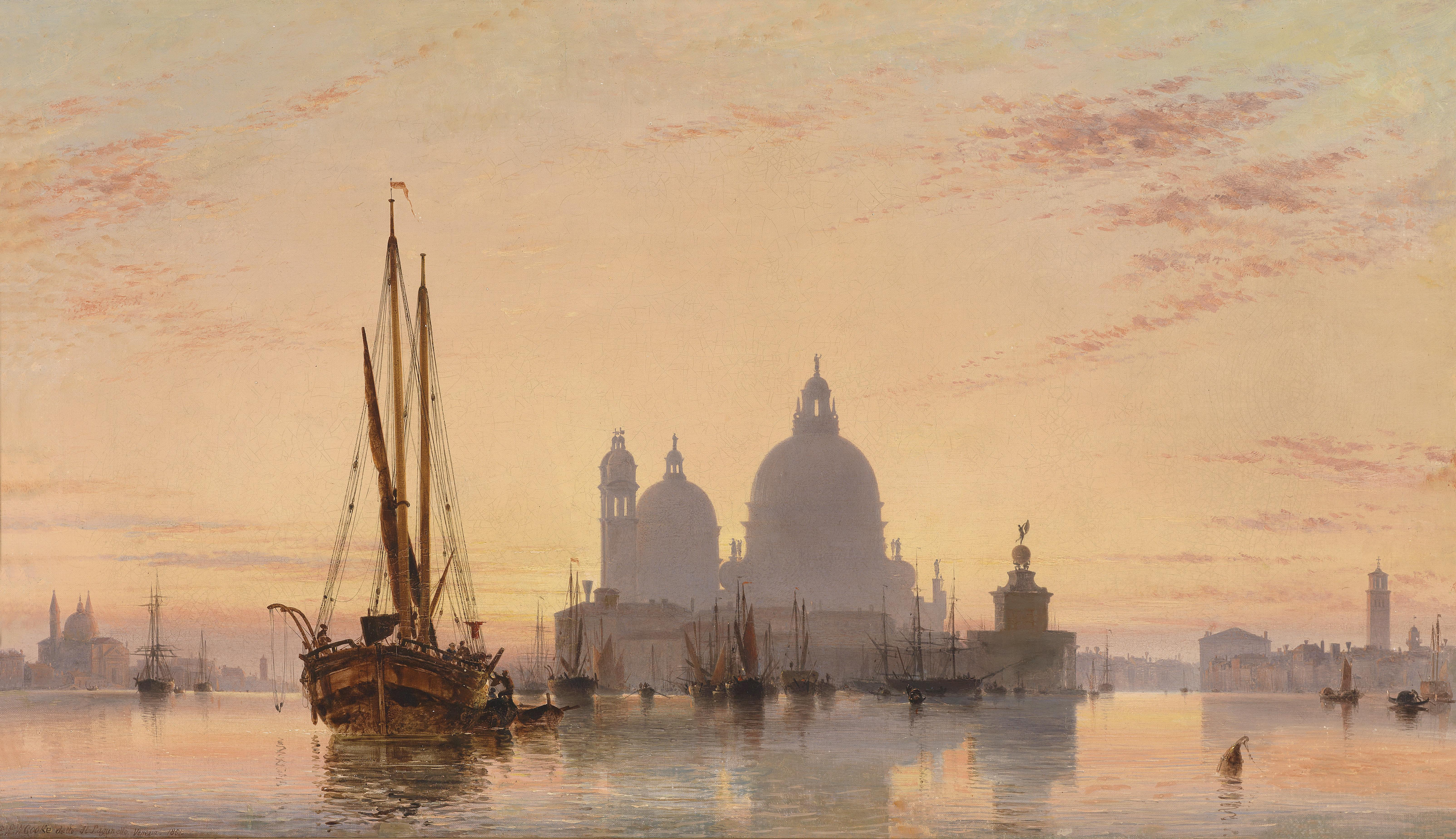
Venice by Edward William Cooke

The Death of Brunelleschi by Frederic Leighton

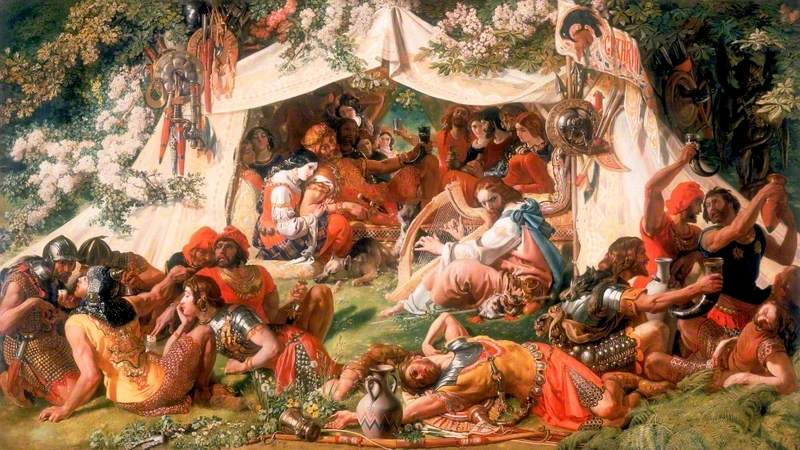
Alfred the Saxon King, Disguised as a Minstrel, in the Tent of Guthrum the Dane by Daniel Maclise

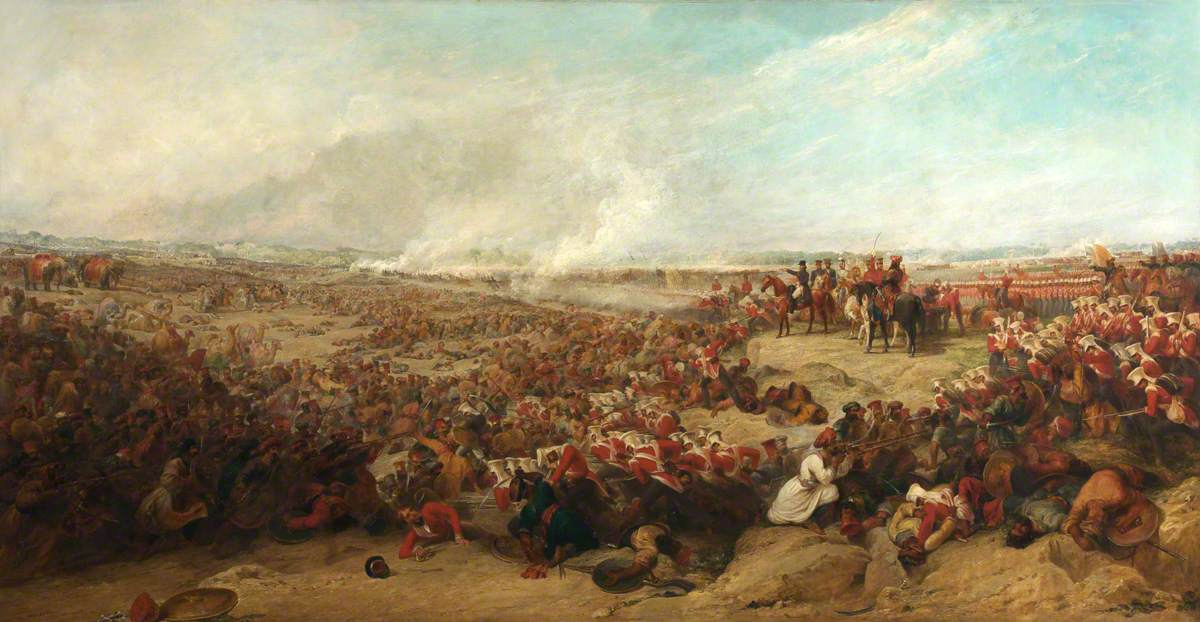
The Battle of Meeanee by George Jones

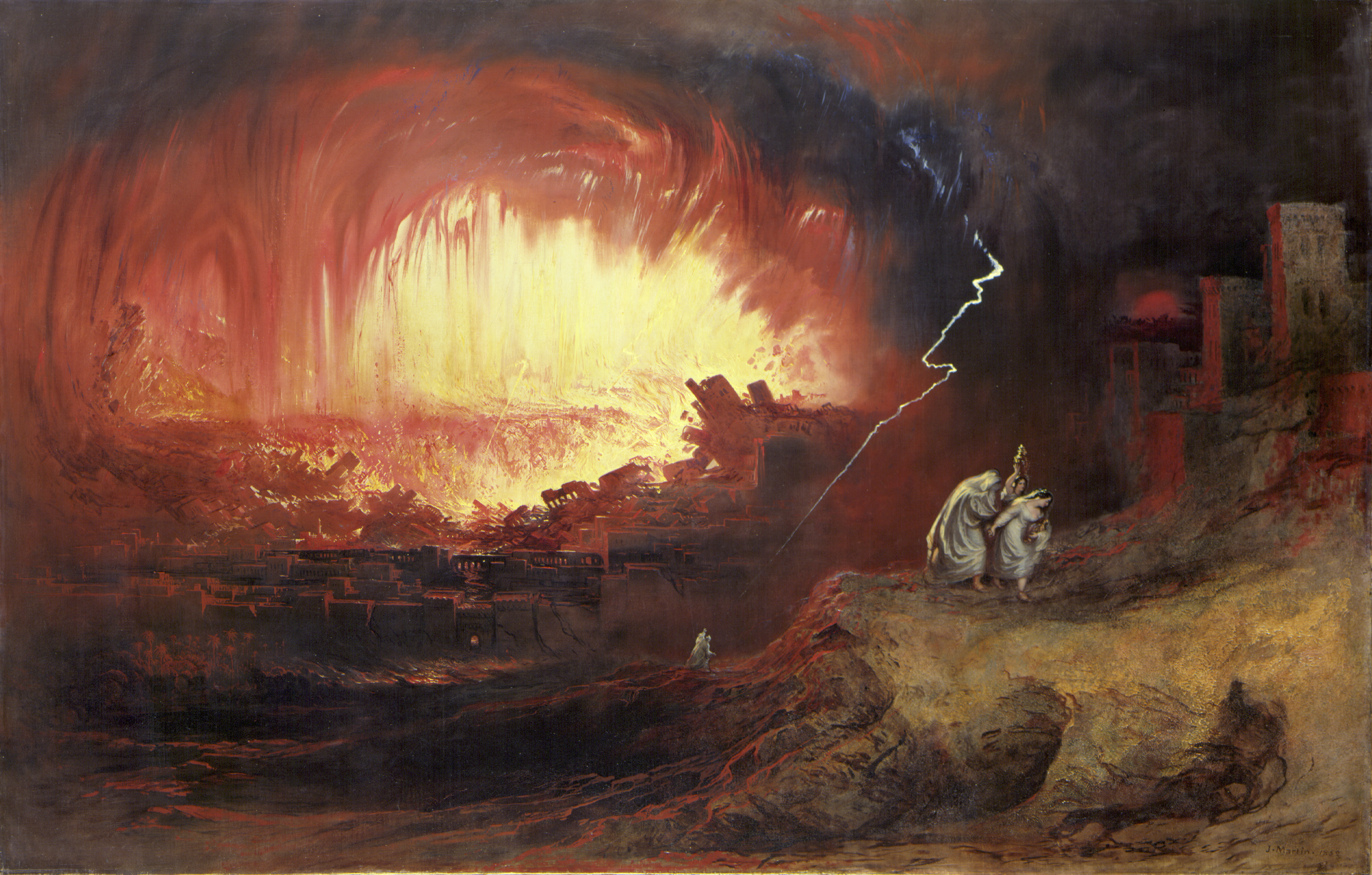
The Destruction of Sodom and Gomorrah by John Martin

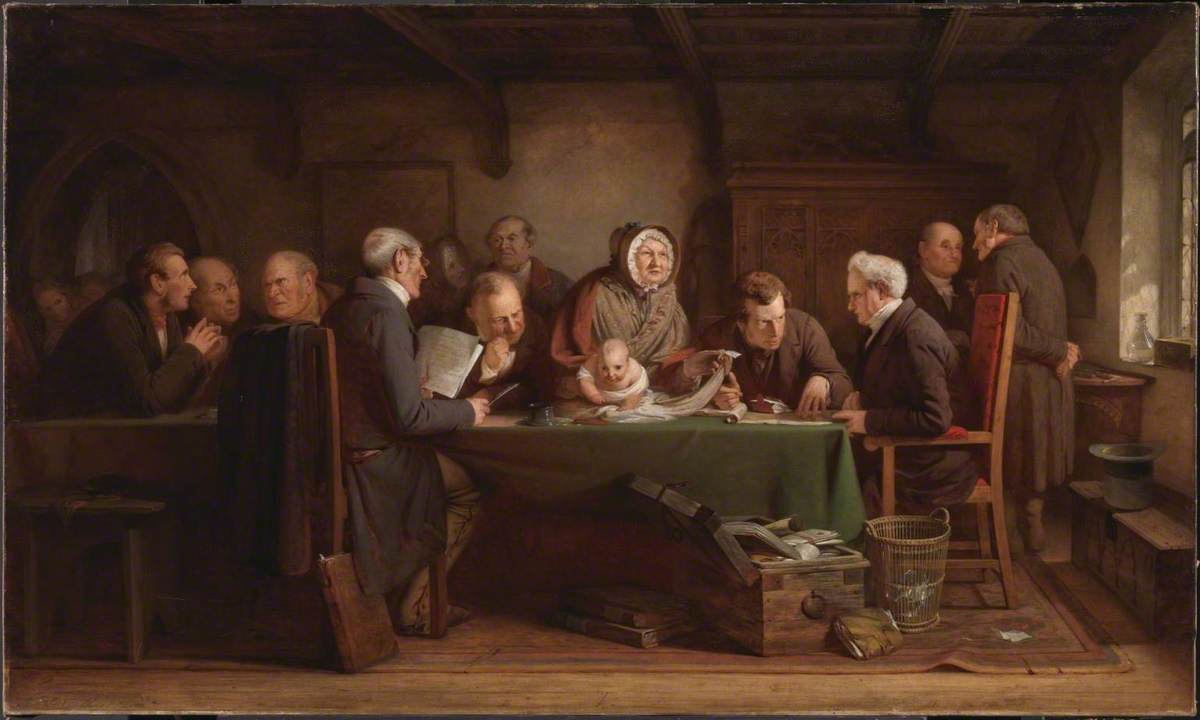
The Foundling by George Bernard O'Neill

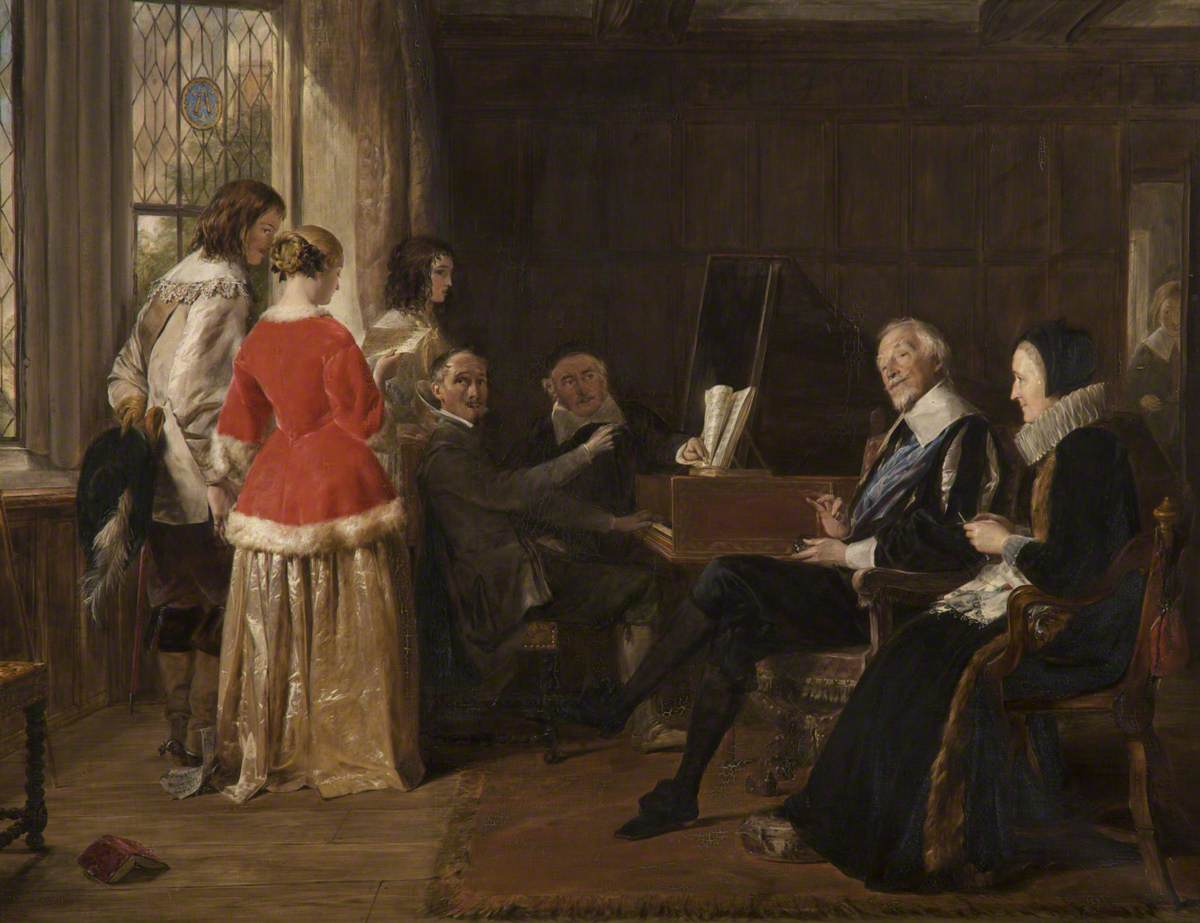
A Madrigal by John Callcott Horsley

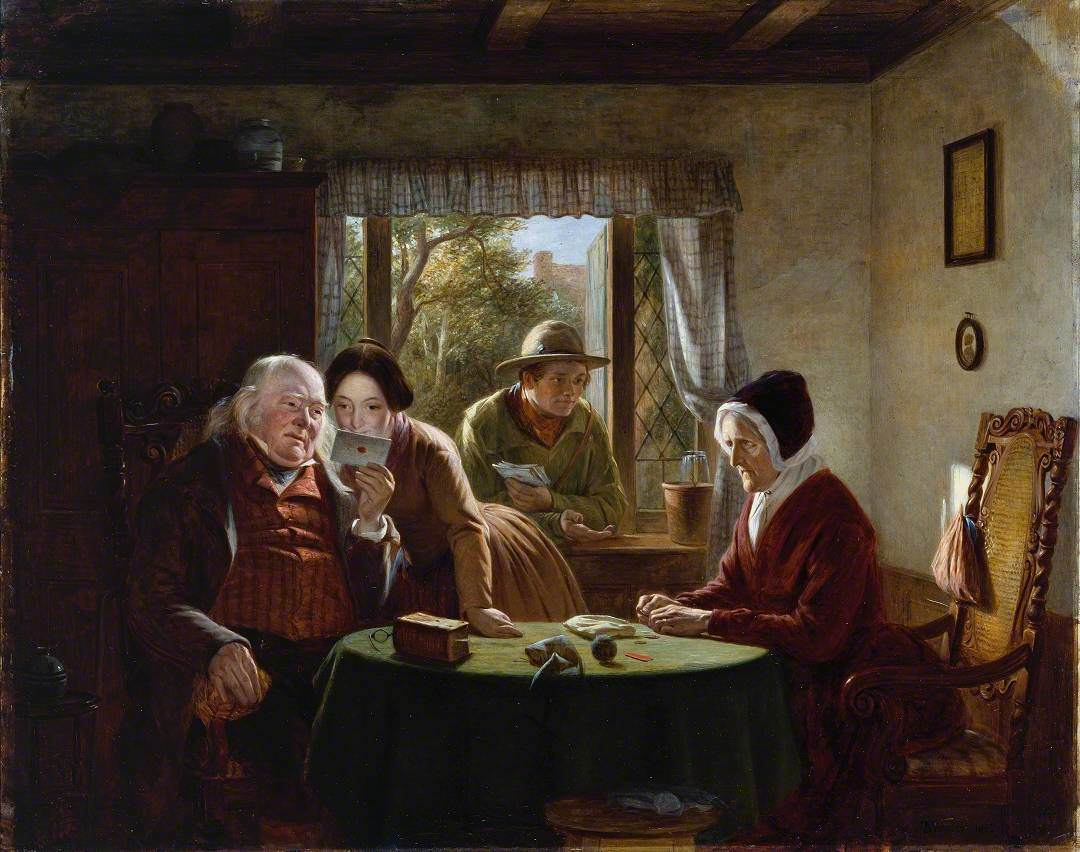
A Letter from the Colonies by Thomas Webster

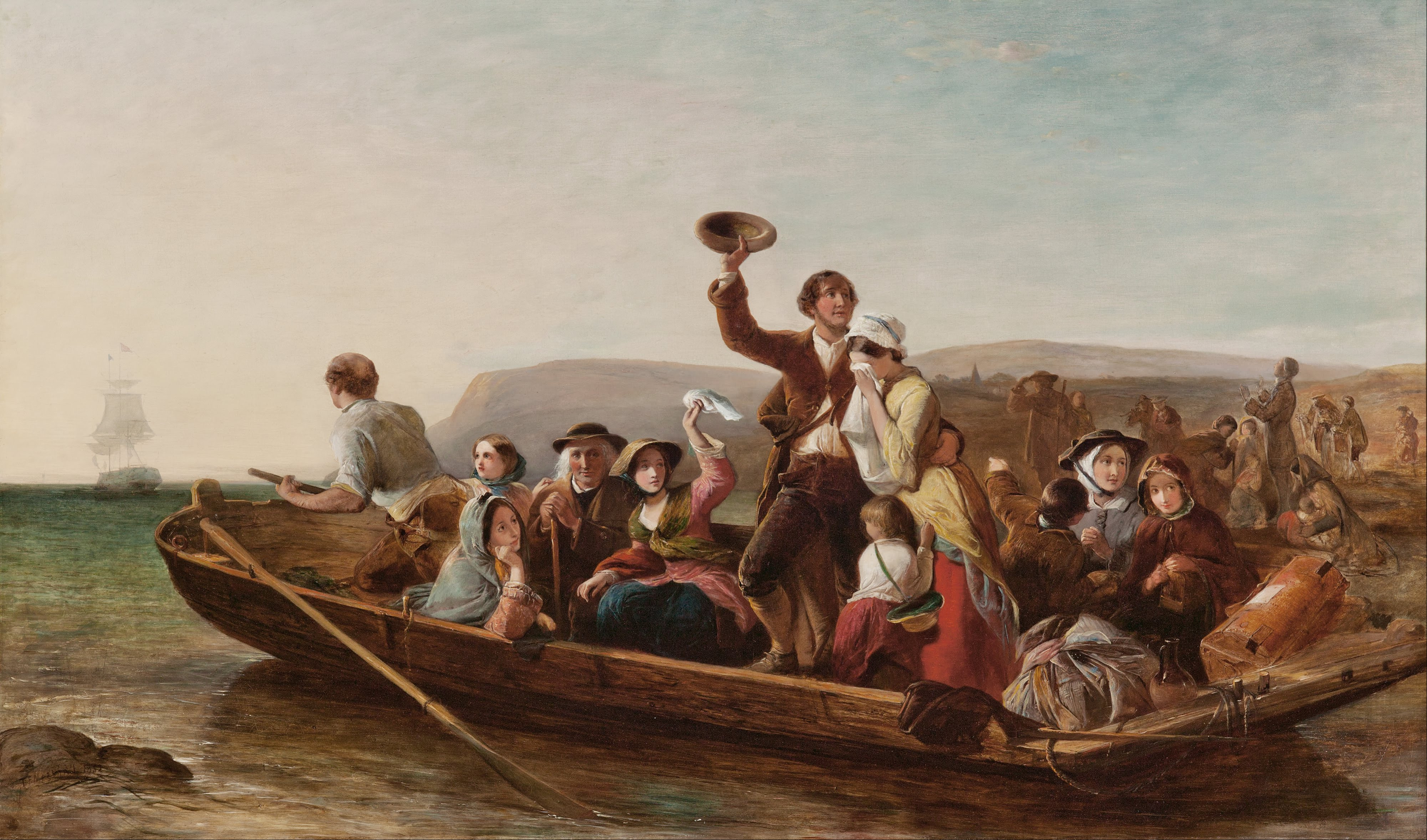
Emigration by Thomas Falcon Marshall

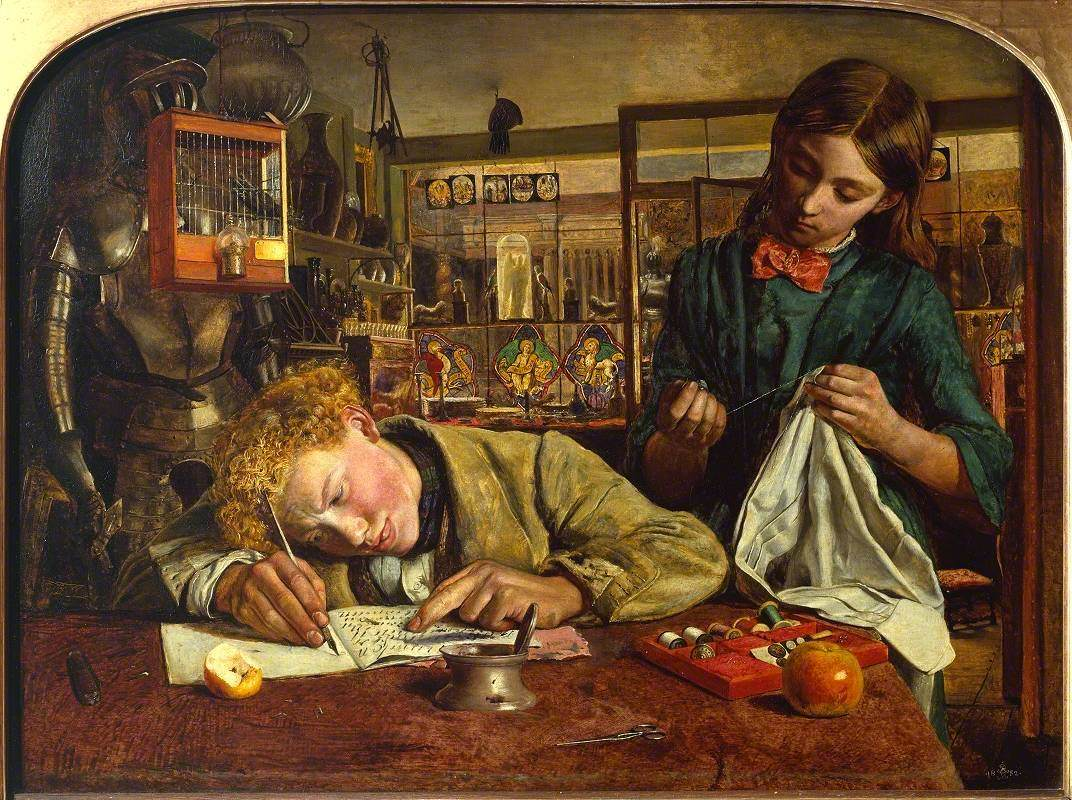
Kit's Writing Lesson by Robert Braithwaite Martineau

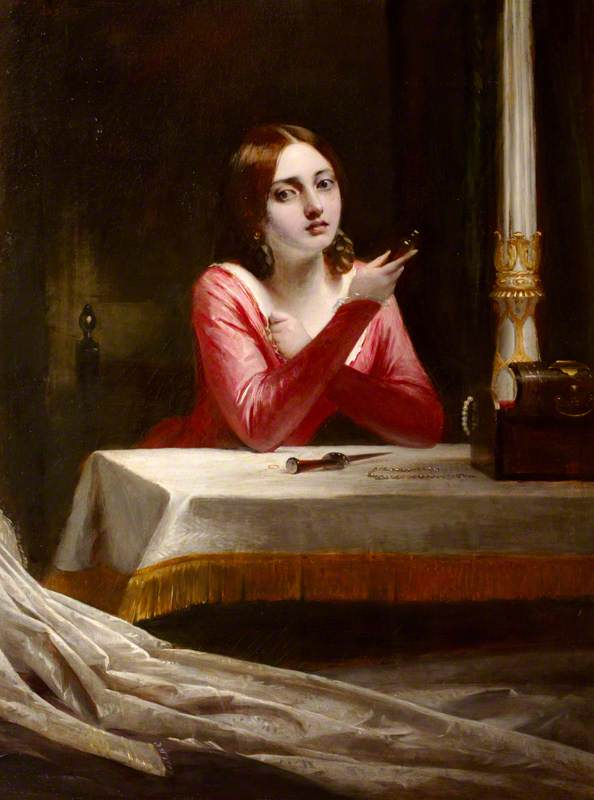
Juliet by Charles Robert Leslie

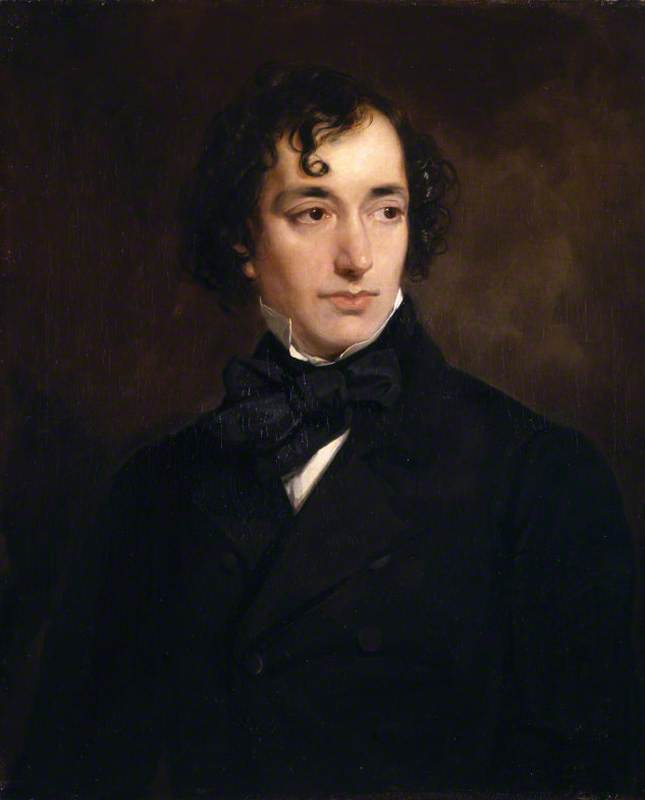
Portrait of Benjamin Disraeli by Francis Grant

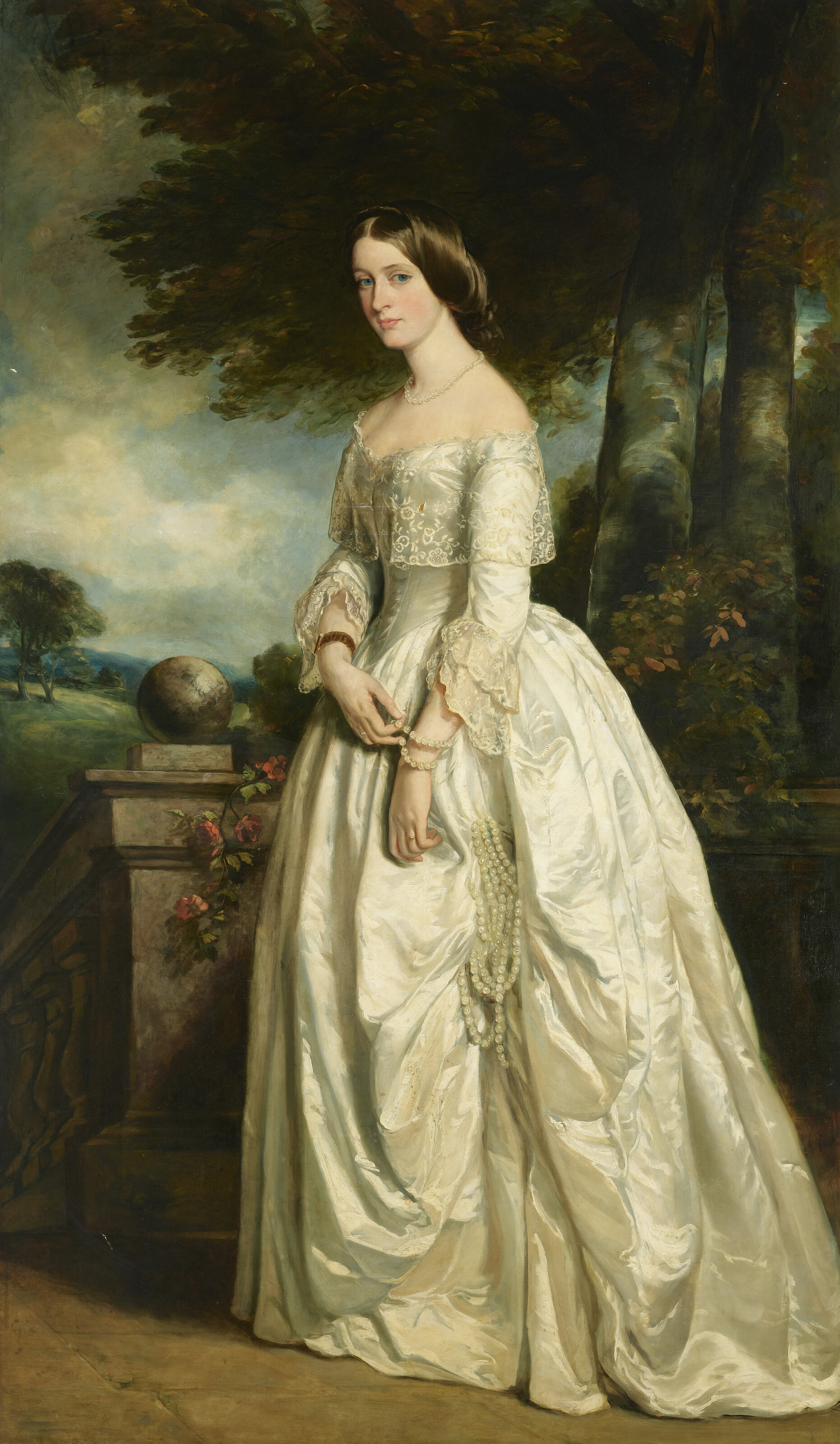
Portrait of Countess Kintore by Francis Grant

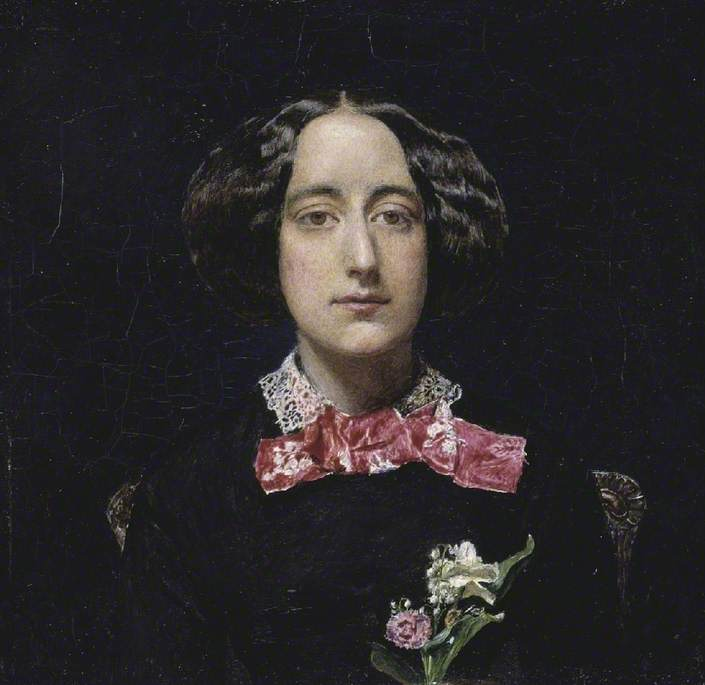
Portrait of Emily Augusta Patmore by John Everett Millais

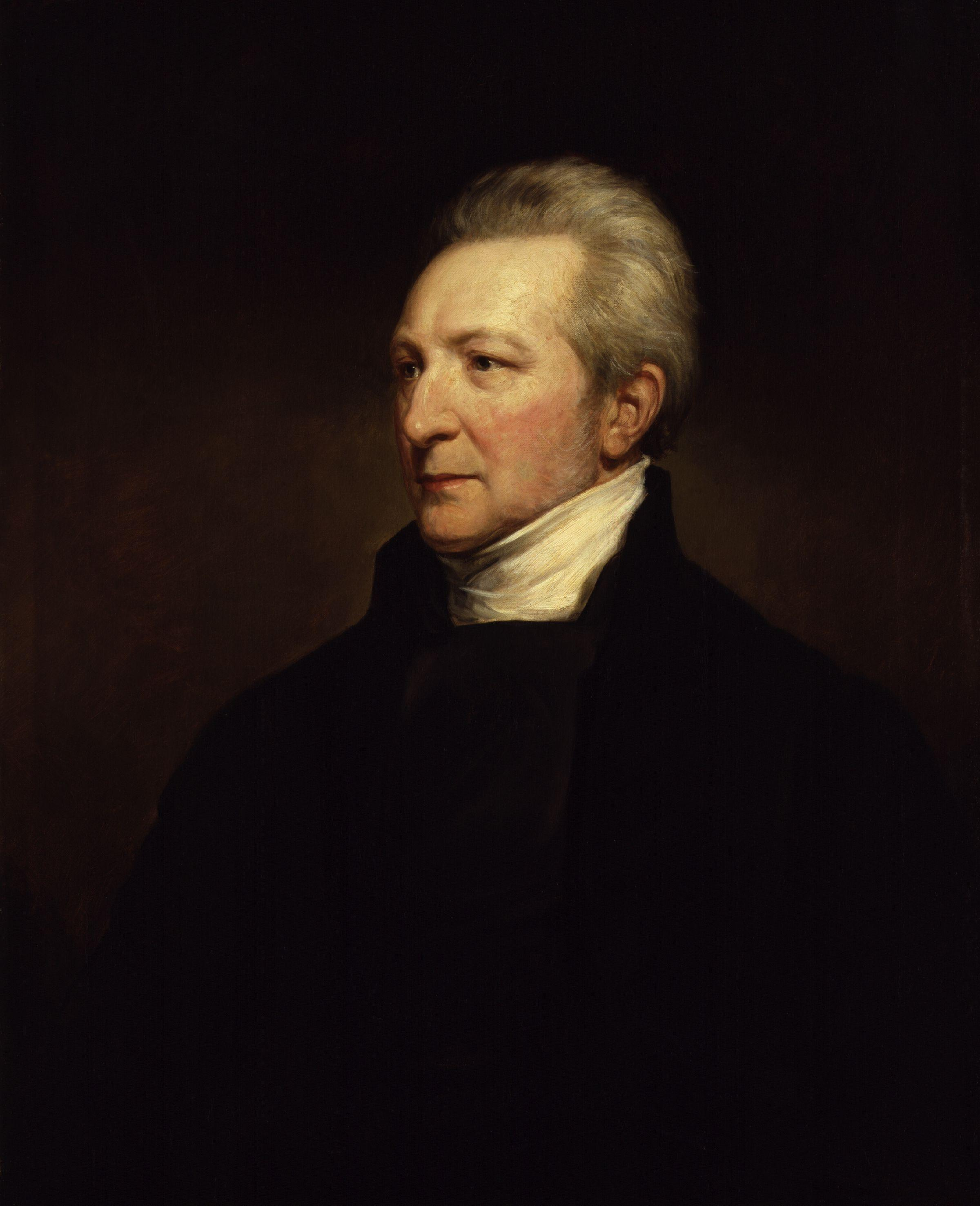
Portrait of John Bird Sumner by Margaret Sarah Carpenter

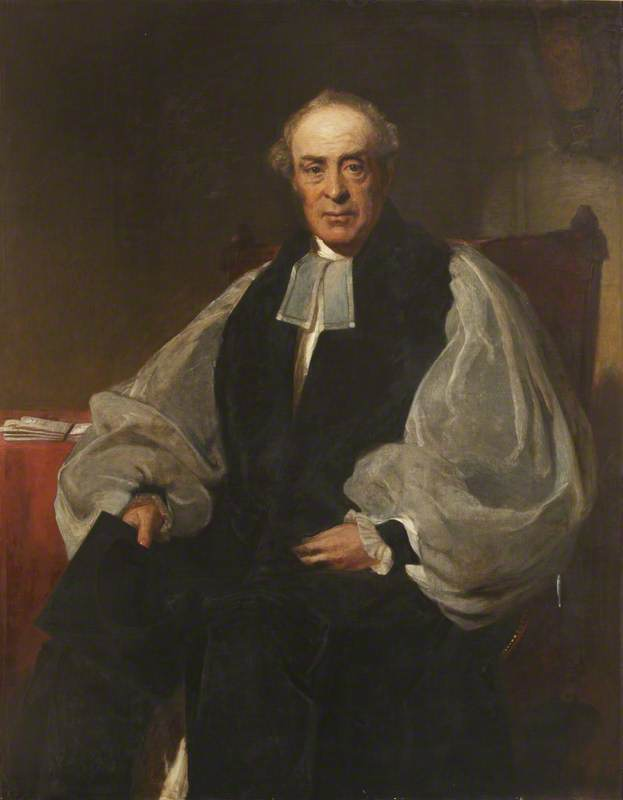
Portrait of Henry Philpotts by John Prescott Knight

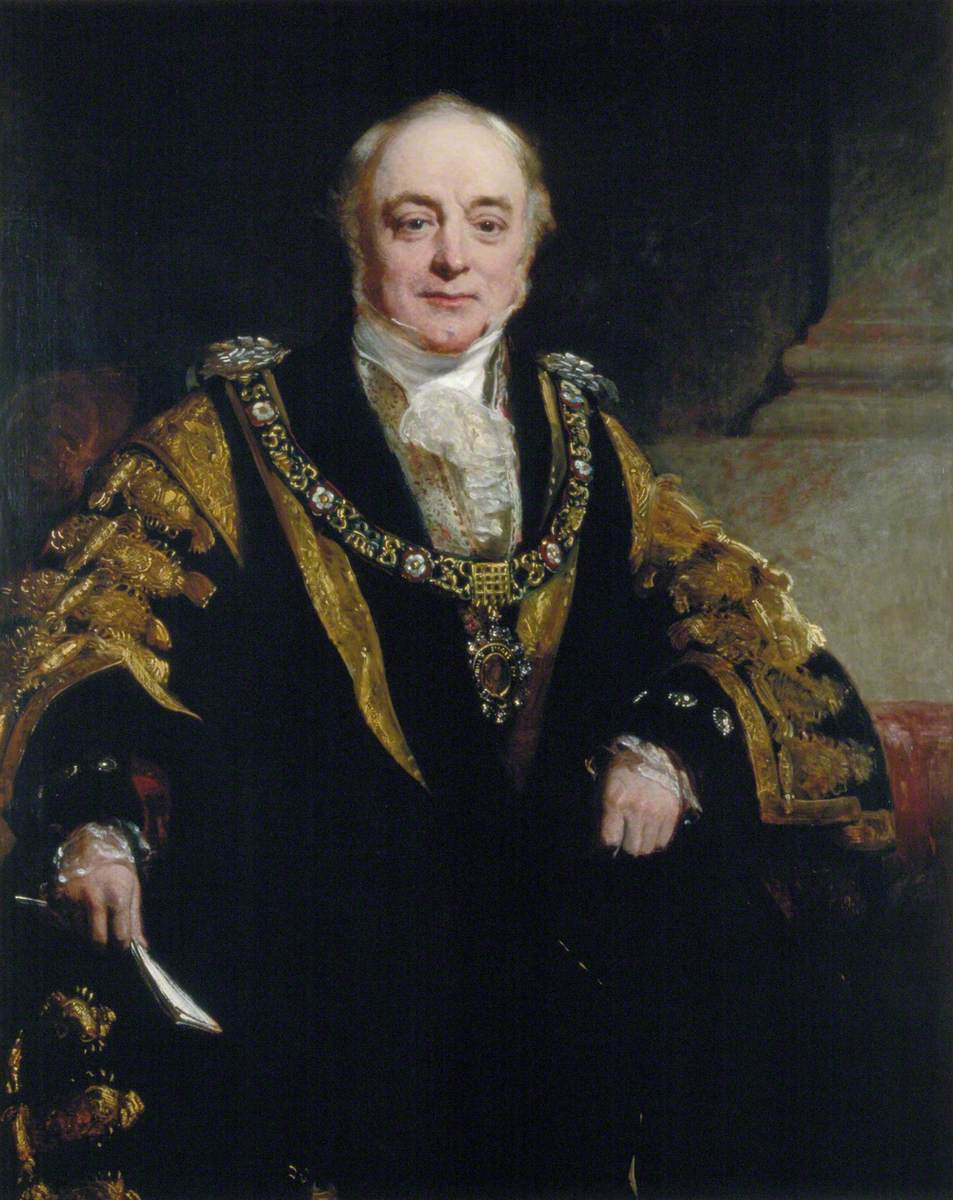
Portrait of John Musgrave by John Prescott Knight

Portrait of William Hopkins by Henry William Pickersgill

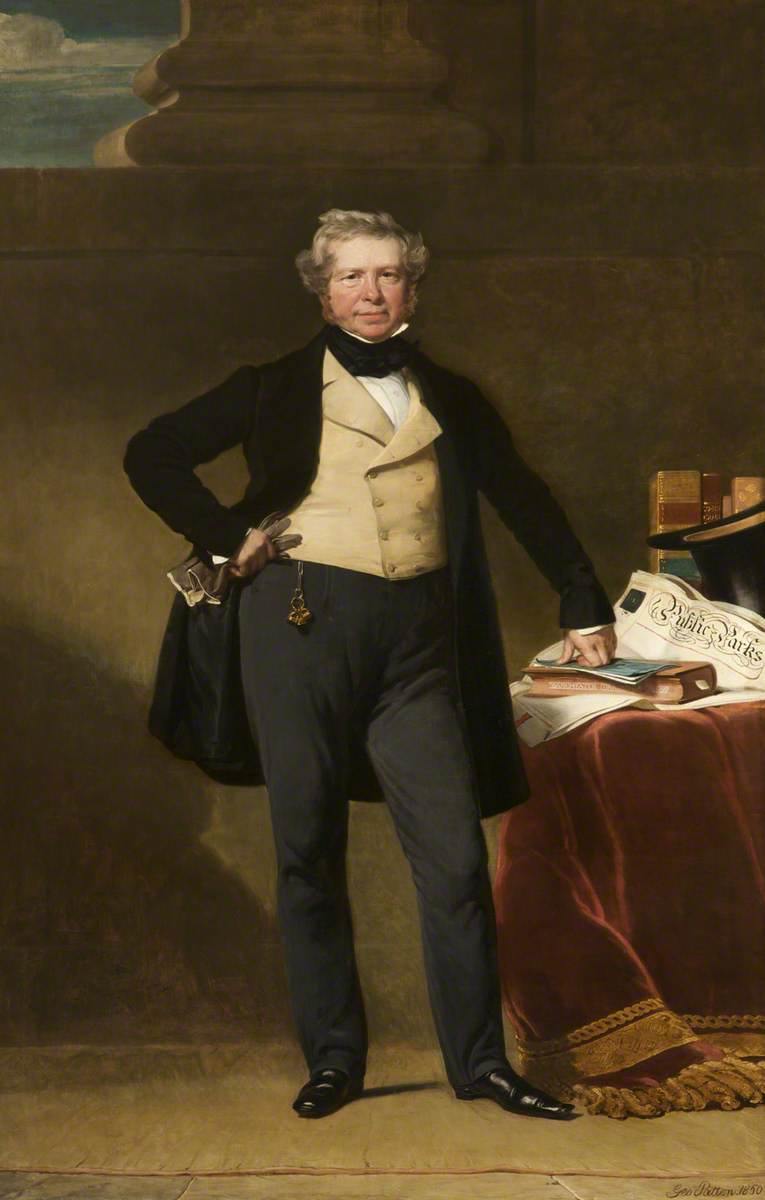
Portrait of William Benjamin Watkins by George Patten

== See also ==
- Royal Academy Exhibition of 1851, the previous year's exhibition
- Salon of 1852, a contemporary French exhibition held at the Palais-Royal in Paris

== Bibliography ==
- Murray, Peter. Daniel Maclise, 1806-1870: Romancing the Past. Crawford Art Gallery, 2009.
- Weinig, Mary Anthony. Coventry Patmore. Twayne Publishers, 1981.
- Wills, Catherine. High Society: The Life and Art of Sir Francis Grant, 1803–1878. National Galleries of Scotland, 2003.
