= May, in the Regent's Park =

Painting by Charles Allston Collins

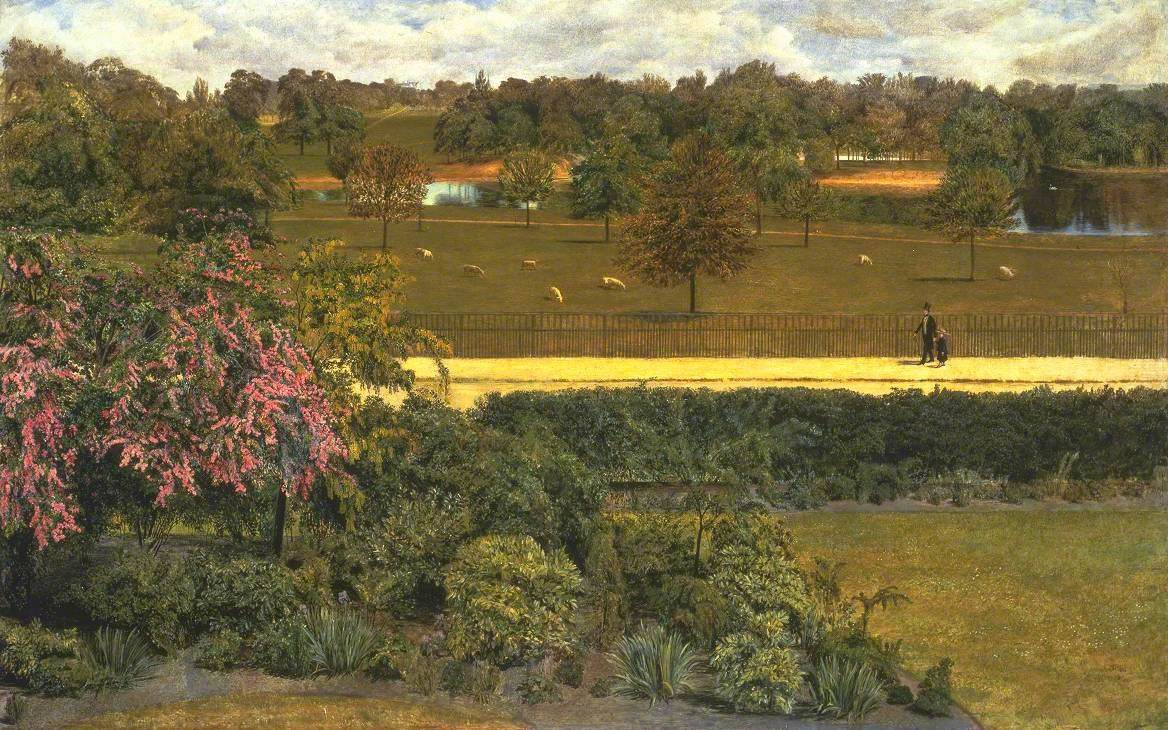
- Artist: Charles Allston Collins
- Year: 1851
- Type: Oil on mahogany, landscape painting
- Dimensions: 69.2 cm × 44.5 cm (27.2 in × 17.5 in)
- Location: Tate Britain, London

May, in the Regent's Park is an 1851 landscape painting by the British artist Charles Allston Collins. The picture features a view of Regent's Park in London during the Spring. It was likely painted from the window of the artist's family home at Hanover Terrace. The title may refer both to the season of the year and the hawthorn blossom, often known as May Tree, visible on the left.

The son of the painter William Collins and younger brother of the novelist Wilkie Collins, he was associated with the Pre-Raphaelite Brotherhood, and produced this in the meticulous style associated with them. The picture was displayed at the Royal Academy Exhibition of 1852 at the National Gallery in London, and was one of the first Pre-Raphaelite landscapes to be exhibited. Today it is in the collection of the Tate Britain in Pimlico, having been purchased in 1980.

== Bibliography ==
- Bury, Stephen (ed.) Benezit Dictionary of British Graphic Artists and Illustrators, Volume 1. OUP, 2012
- Staley, Allen. Pre-Raphaelite Vision: Truth to Nature. Harry N. Abrams, 2004.
