= Portrait of Benjamin Disraeli (Millais) =

Painting by John Everett Millais

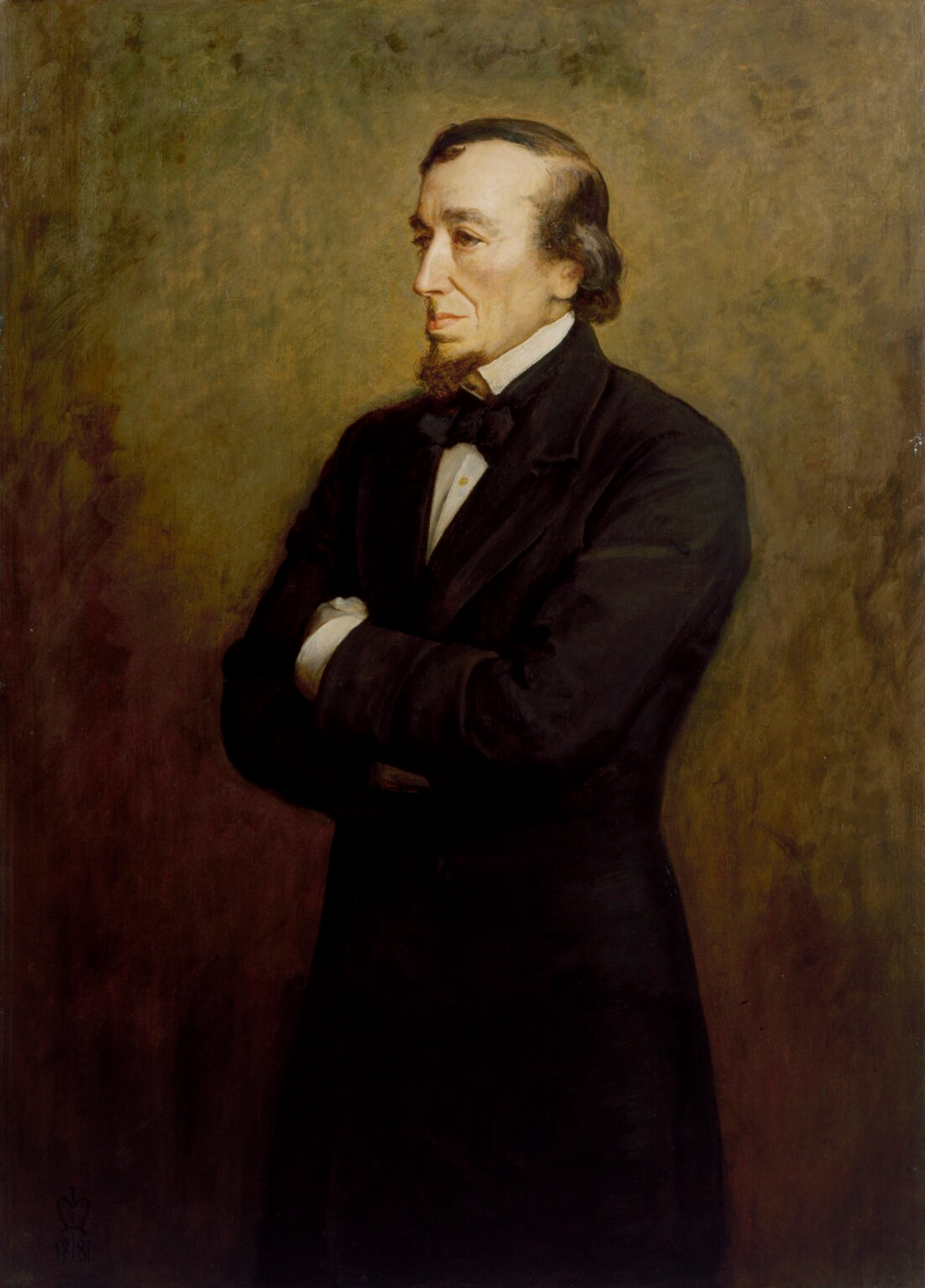
- Artist: John Everett Millais
- Year: 1881
- Type: Oil on canvas, portrait
- Dimensions: 127.6 cm × 93.1 cm (50.2 in × 36.7 in)
- Location: National Portrait Gallery, London

Portrait of Benjamin Disraeli is an 1881 portrait painting by the English artist John Everett Millais featuring the British politician and Prime Minister Benjamin Disraeli. Known in his youth as a novelist, Disraeli turned to politics during the Victorian era and twice held the premiership. He was made Earl of Beaconsfield in 1876.

Millais had made his name as part of the Pre-Raphaelite movement. Disraeli sat for the artist at the suggestion of Lord Ronald Gower. Millais managed to schedule only three sittings as Disraeli was in poor health and died shortly afterwards. At the request of Queen Victoria the painting was sent in as a late entry to the Royal Academy's Summer Exhibition that year. It is now in the collection of the National Portrait Gallery in London, having been acquired in 1945 through a gift by Lord Hambleden. Millais also painted Disraeli's political rival William Gladstone, in 1879, and this is now also in the National Portrait Gallery.

== See also ==
- Portrait of Benjamin Disraeli (Grant), an 1852 painting by Francis Grant

== Bibliography ==
- Barlow, Paul. Time Present and Time Past: The Art of John Everett Millais. Routledge, 2017.
- McAdams, Ruth. Temporality and Progress in Victorian Literature. Edinburgh University Press, 2024.
- Prizel, Natalie, Victorian Ethical Optics: Innocent Eyes and Aberrant Bodies. Oxford University Press, 2024.
- Riding, Christine. Tate British Artists: John Everett Millais. Harry N. Abrams, 2006.
