= The Rejected Poet =

Painting by William Powell Frith

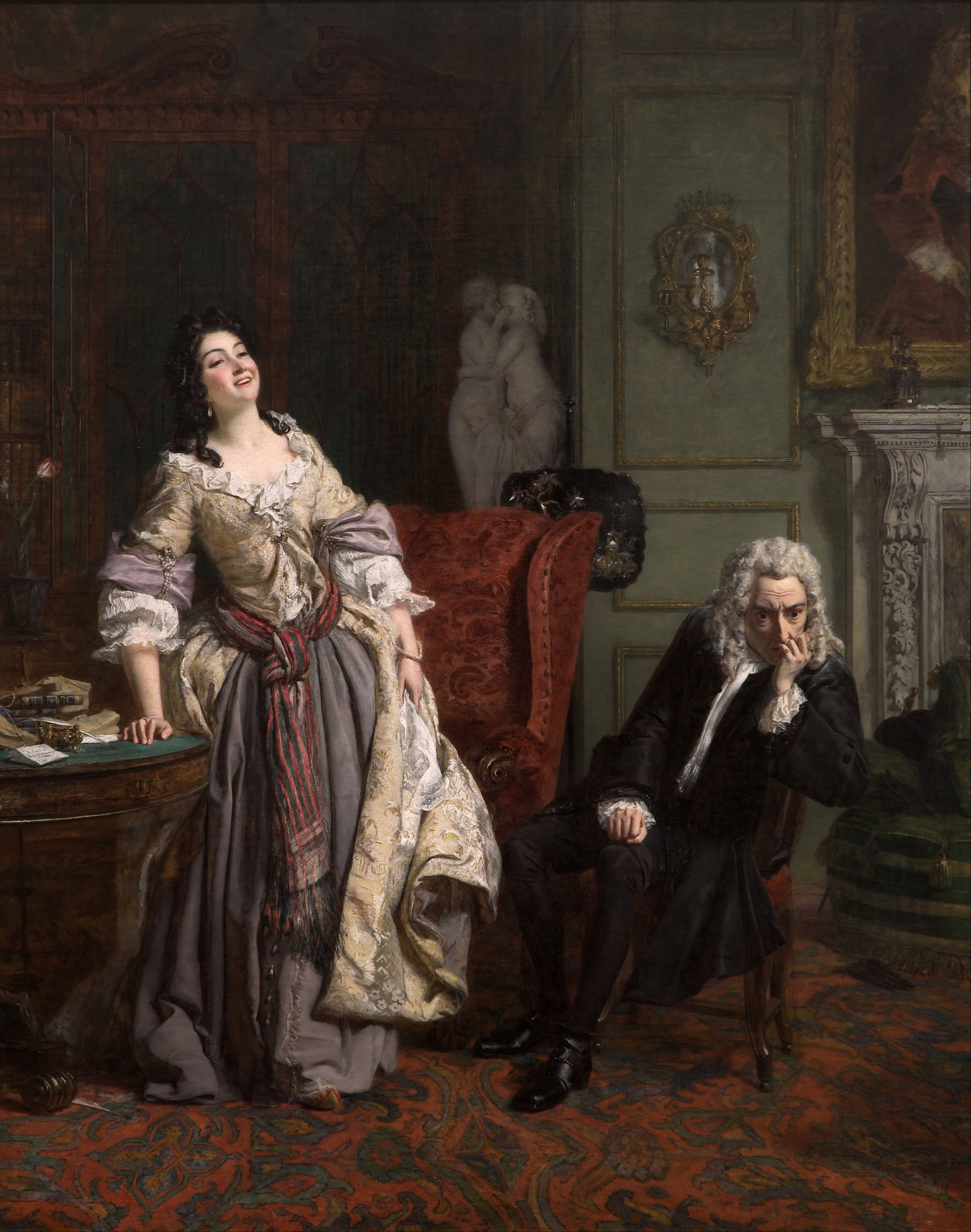
- Artist: William Powell Frith
- Year: 1852
- Type: Oil on canvas, history painting
- Dimensions: 118 cm × 94.2 cm (46 in × 37.1 in)
- Location: Auckland Art Gallery, Auckland

The Rejected Poet, also known as Pope Makes Love To Lady Mary Wortley Montagu, is an 1852 oil painting by the British artist William Powell Frith. The painting is the artist's imagined depiction of the failed attempt by the poet Alexander Pope to woo the traveler and writer Lady Mary Wortley Montagu. Lady Mary attempted to remain serious but burst into laughter, after which Pope became her lifelong enemy.

Frith wrote in his autobiography, "[I] could not resist the dramatic effect of the two figures—the consuming rage of Pope, contrasted by the cruel laughter of the lady." The artist said he consulted multiple sources when painting the poet but felt the bust of Pope by Louis-François Roubiliac was the closest likeness. It has been suggested that the model for Lady Mary was Mary Alford, Frith's long-term lover, with whom he had several children.

== Exhibition history ==
The painting was first displayed at the Royal Academy Exhibition of 1852 held at the National Gallery in London. In 1855, it was shown at the Exposition Universelle in Paris. Frith was awarded a Second Class Medal for the painting at the exposition.

== Location and versions ==
From 1873 to 1906, the painting changed hands several times. In 1974, Sir Frank Mappin gave The Rejected Poet to the Auckland Art Gallery in New Zealand for its collection. A second smaller version of the painting from 1863 is in the Wolverhampton Art Gallery in England. This smaller painting was bequeathed to the gallery by Maria Christiana Cartwright in 1887.
