= Portrait of Benjamin Disraeli (Grant) =

Painting by Francis Grant

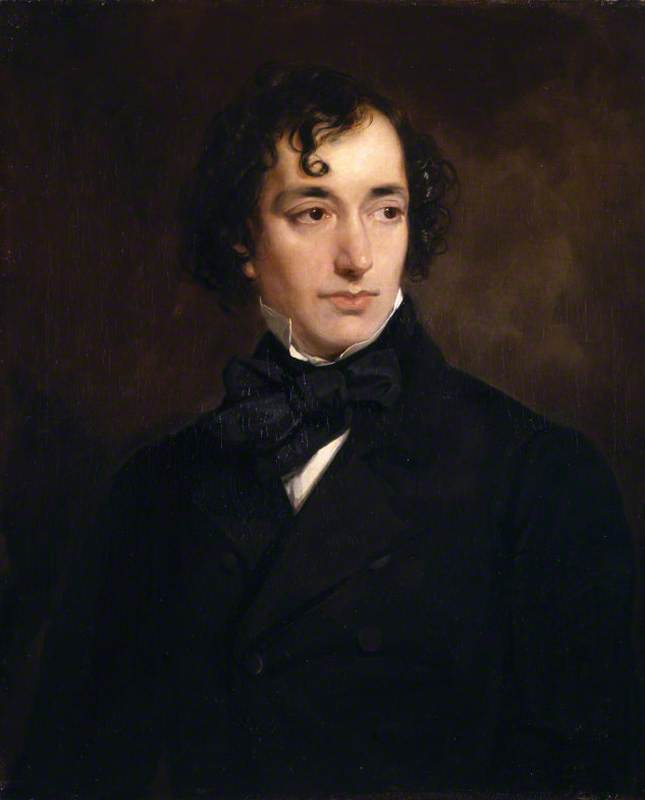
- Artist: Francis Grant
- Year: 1852
- Type: Oil on canvas, portrait
- Dimensions: 96.5 cm × 83.8 cm (38.0 in × 33.0 in)
- Location: Hughenden Manor, Buckinghamshire

Portrait of Benjamin Disraeli is an oil on canvas portrait painting by the British artist Francis Grant, from 1852. It depicts Benjamin Disraeli, a Conservative politician and future Prime Minister. The same year Disraeli was appointed Chancellor of the Exchequer in the Tory Government of the Earl of Derby. It is also known by the alternative title Disraeli as a Young Man.

The work was displayed at the Royal Academy Exhibition of 1852 in London.Grant was a fashionable portrait painter of the early Victorian era. In 1866 he was elected to succeed Charles Lock Eastlake as President of the Royal Academy. Disraeli was notably painted again by John Everett Millais in 1881. Today the painting is in the collection of the National Trust at Disraeli's country residence of Hughenden Manor in Buckinghamshire, having been donated by the Disraelian Society in 1947.

== See also ==
- Portrait of Benjamin Disraeli (Millais), an 1881 portrait by John Everett Millais

== Bibliography ==
- Greeves, Lydia. History and Landscape: The Guide to National Trust Properties in England, Wales and Northern Ireland. National Trust, 2004.
- O'Kell, Robert P. Disraeli: The Romance of Politics. University of Toronto Press, 2014.
- Ridley, Jane. The Young Disraeli. Sinclair-Stevenson, 1996.
- Wills, Catherine. High Society: The Life and Art of Sir Francis Grant, 1803–1878. National Galleries of Scotland, 2003.
