= The Royal Commissioners for the Exhibition of 1851 =

Painting by Henry Wyndham Phillips

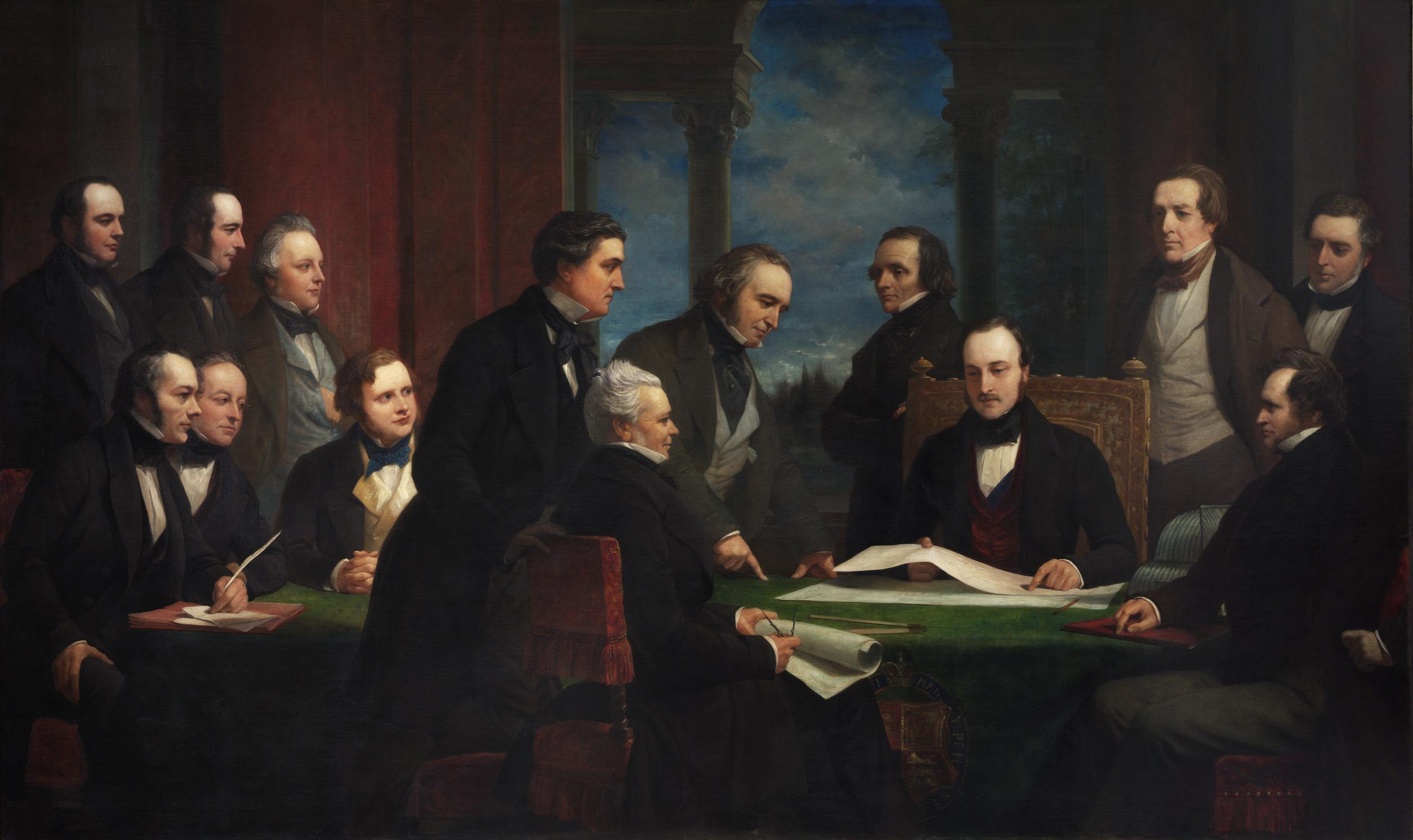
- Artist: Henry Wyndham Phillips
- Year: 1850
- Type: Oil on canvas
- Dimensions: 209.6 cm × 358.6 cm (82.5 in × 141.2 in)
- Location: Victoria and Albert Museum, London

The Royal Commissioners for the Exhibition of 1851 is an 1850 oil painting by the English artist Henry Wyndham Phillips. A conversation piece, it depicts portraits of the various member of the Royal Commission established to oversee the Great Exhibition held in Hyde Park the following year.

Seated at the table examining the plans for The Crystal Palace is the prince consort Prince Albert. From left to right the painting includes Charles Wentworth Dilke, Richard Cobden, John Scott Russell, Charles Barry, Henry Cole, Earl Granville, Charles Fox, William Cubitt, Joseph Paxton, Lord John Russell, Prince Albert, Robert Peel, the Earl of Derby and Robert Stephenson. Today the painting is in the collection of the Victoria and Albert Museum in South Kensington.

== See also ==
- The Opening of the Great Exhibition by Queen Victoria, an 1852 painting by Henry Courtney Selous.

== Bibliography ==
- Auerbach, Jeffrey A. The Great Exhibition of 1851: A Nation on Display. Yale University Press, 1999.
- Chadwick, George F. The Works of Sir Joseph Paxton, 1803-1865. Architectural Press, 1961.
- Hobhouse, Hermione. The Crystal Palace and the Great Exhibition: Science, Art and Productive Industry: The History of the Royal Commission for the Exhibition of 1851. A&C Black, 2002.
