= Royal Commission for the Exhibition of 1851 =

Grant-making educational trust

The Royal Commission for the Exhibition of 1851 is an institution founded in 1850 to administer the Great Exhibition of the Works of Industry of all Nations, which was held in The Crystal Palace, London.

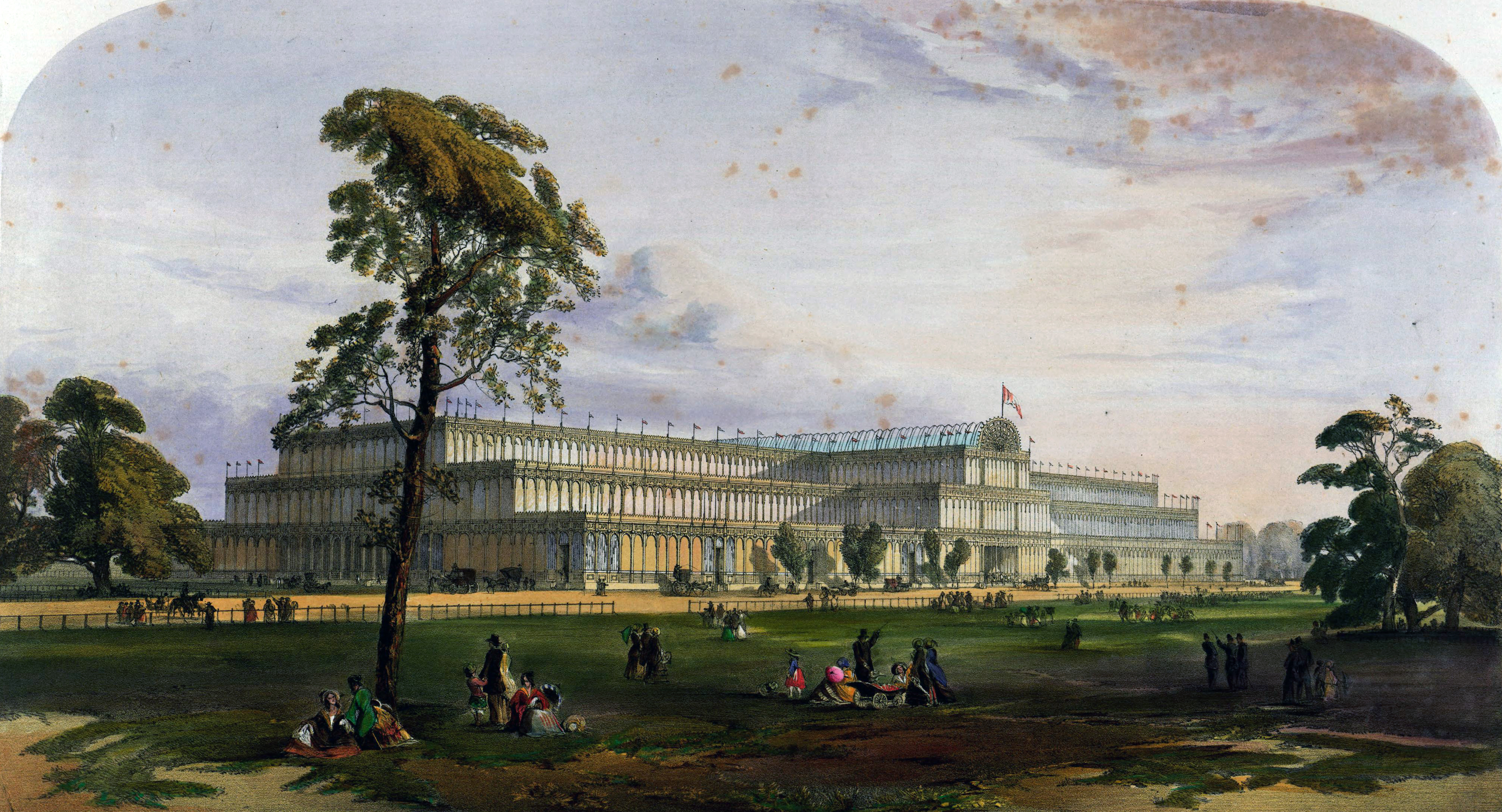
The 1851 Great Exhibition in Hyde Park

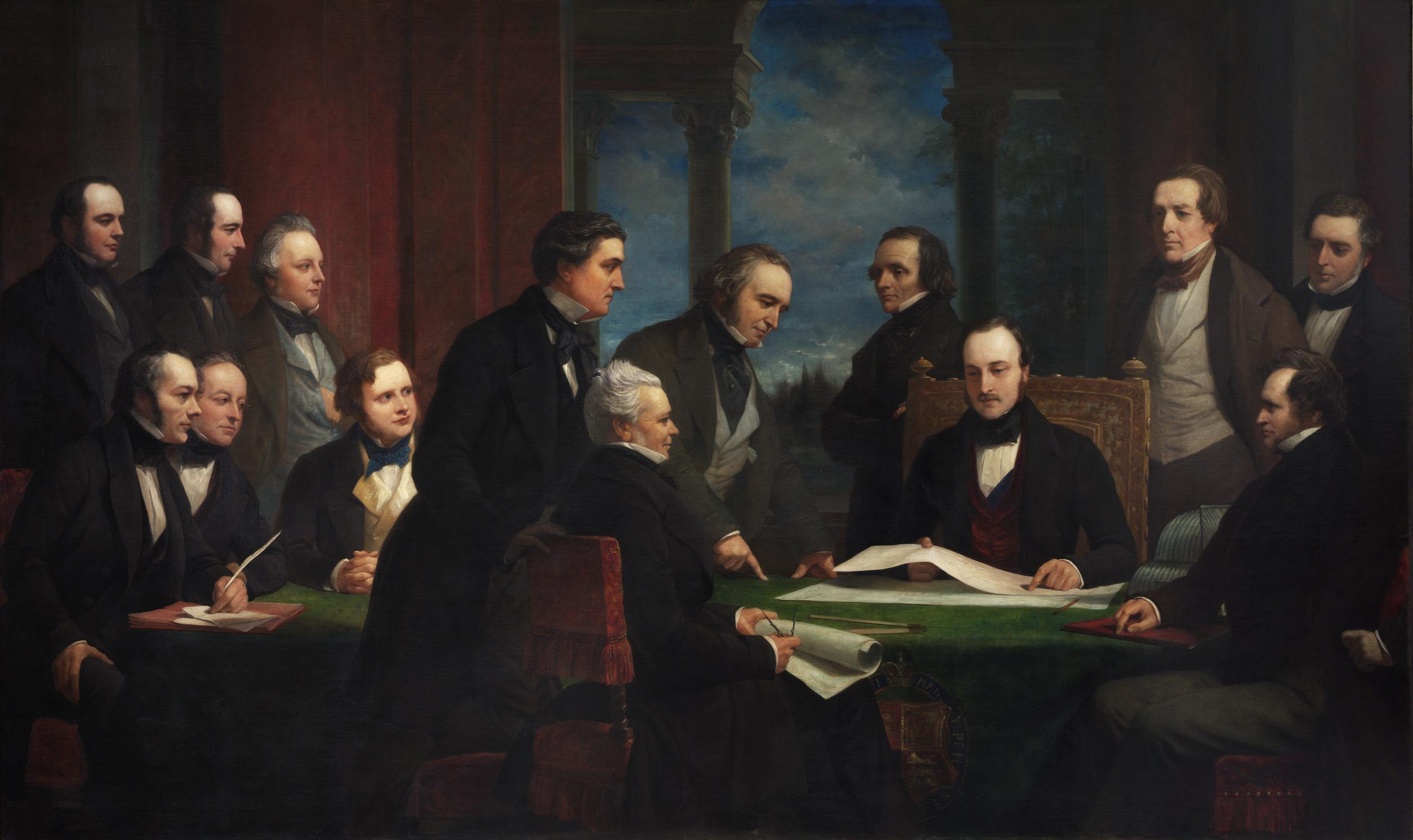
The Royal Commissioners for the Exhibition of 1851 by Henry Wyndham Phillips

The founding President of the Commission was Prince Albert of Saxe-Coburg and Gotha and its chief administrator was Henry Cole. The current President is Anne, Princess Royal.

The exhibition was a popular and financial success, with a surplus of £186,000 (equivalent to £22,450,000 in 2025). An unusual decision was made to maintain the Royal Commission as a permanent administrative body and to use the profits for charitable purposes. Its revised charter charged the commission with "increasing the means of industrial education, and extending the influence of science and art upon productive industry".

== South Kensington ==
The commission invested the profits from the 1851 Exhibition in the purchase of 86 acres (350,000 m^{2}) of land in South Kensington. The area was then developed as a centre for educational and cultural institutions, often known as "Albertopolis". These include:

- Imperial College
- the Natural History Museum
- the Royal Albert Hall
- the Royal College of Art
- the Royal College of Music
- the Science Museum
- the Victoria and Albert Museum

The Commission's headquarters are in Imperial College.

Since 1891, the Commission has been providing scholarships and fellowships supporting study and research in Britain and abroad, including the prestigious 1851 Research Fellowship. Former recipients of these awards include 13 Nobel Prize laureates.

The commission currently has capital assets of more than £76 million and makes charitable disbursement of more than £2 million a year.

== See also ==
- 1851 Research Fellowship
