= The Opening of the Great Exhibition by Queen Victoria =

Painting by Henry Courtney Selous

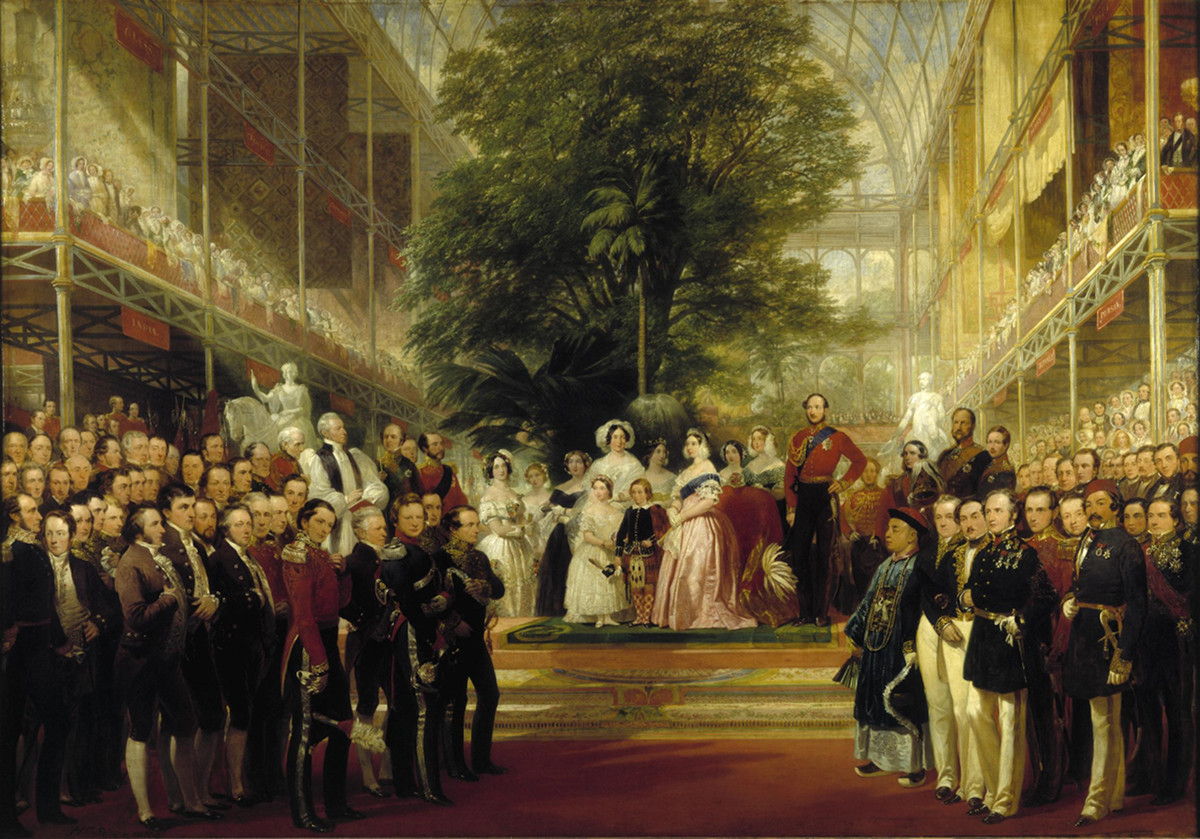
- Artist: Henry Courtney Selous
- Year: 1851–52
- Type: Oil on canvas, history painting
- Dimensions: 169.5 cm × 241.9 cm (66.7 in × 95.2 in)
- Location: Victoria and Albert Museum; London

The Opening of the Great Exhibition by Queen Victoria is an 1852 history painting by the British artist Henry Courtney Selous. It depicts the opening of the Great Exhibition at the Crystal Palace in Hyde Park on 1 May 1851. Queen Victoria, Prince Albert and their children are on the raised dais in the centre of the painting, surrounded by government ministers, other leading figures such as the Duke of Wellington and foreign delegations. The Archbishop of Canterbury John Bird Sumner blesses the proceedings.

Sealous exhibited the painting in a building off Trafalgar Square in May 1852 and it became one of the best-known images of the Great Exhibition due to the prints made from it. Today it is in the collection of the Victoria and Albert Museum in South Kensington, which was built from the proceeds of the Great Exhibition, and was acquired in 1889.

== See also ==
- The Royal Commissioners for the Exhibition of 1851, an 1850 painting by Henry Wyndham Phillips.
- The Inauguration of the Great Exhibition, an 1852 painting by David Roberts

== Bibliography ==
- Cantor, Geoffrey. Religion and the Great Exhibition of 1851. Oxford University Press, 24 Feb 2011.
- Carlisle, Janice. Picturing Reform in Victorian Britain. Cambridge University Press, 2012.
- Taylor, Brandon. Art for the Nation: Exhibitions and the London Public, 1747-2001. Manchester University Press, 1999.
