= Henry Courtney Selous =

English painter

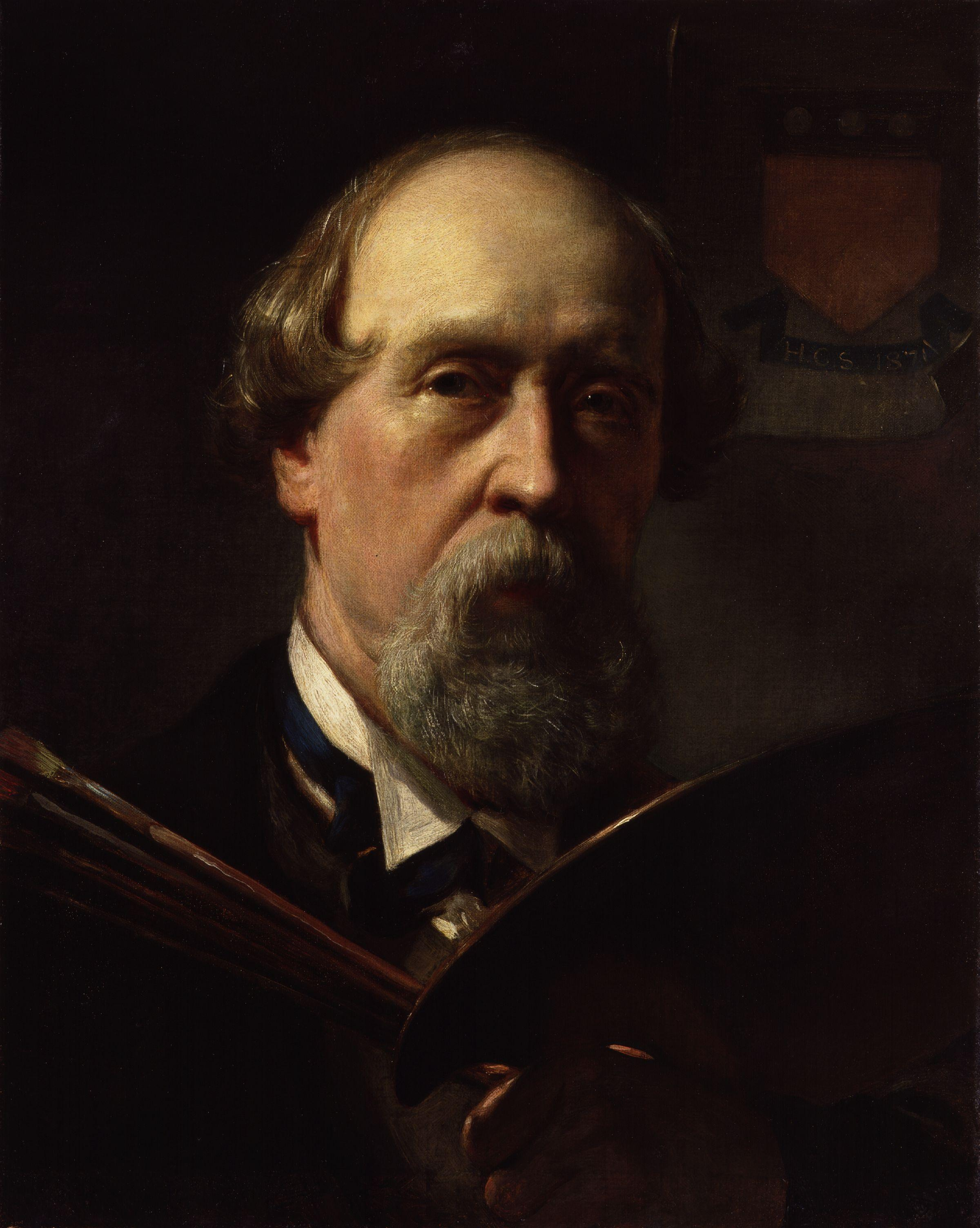
Self-portrait by Selous, 1871

Henry Courtney Selous (b. Panton Street, Haymarket, London 1803; d. Beaworthy, Devon, 24 September 1890) was an English painter, illustrator and lithographer.

== Life ==
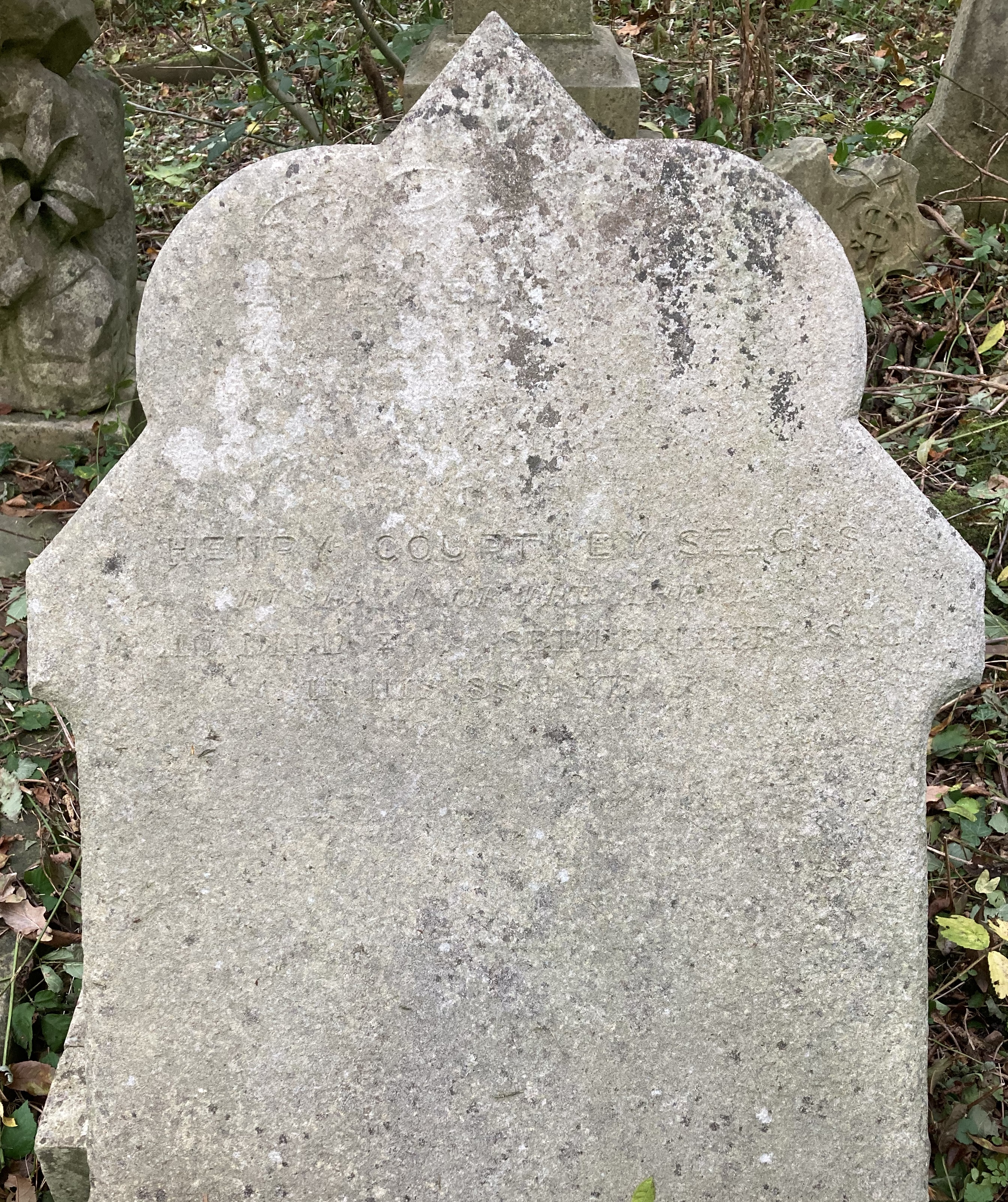
Grave of Henry Courtney Selous in Highgate Cemetery

He was the son of Gideon "George" Slous (1777–1839), a Flemish portrait and miniature painter, and a pupil of John Martin who was an important and influential English painter of the 19th century. He was an occupant of Keats House in Hampstead, from 1835 to 1838. Selous had two brothers, Frederick Lokes Slous (the father of Frederick Courteney Selous) and Angiolo Robson Slous, a playwright who wrote True to the Core: A Story of the Armada and whose daughter Alice married the novelist Morley Roberts.

He married on 4 March 1837 Emily Elizabeth (d. 1879), daughter of the successful miniature painter Henry Pierce Boneat at St Pancras Parish Church and they had four daughters.

He died on 24 September 1890 and was buried on the eastern side of Highgate Cemetery.

== Career ==
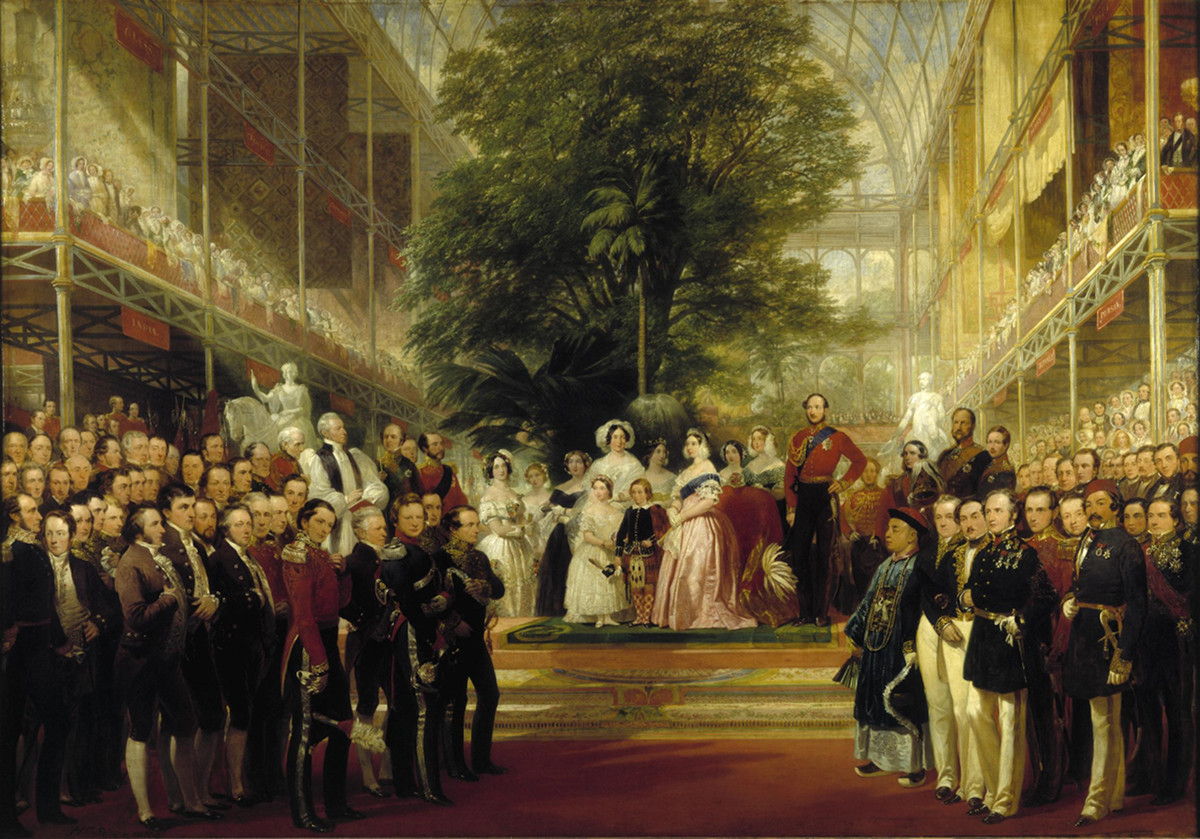
The Opening of the Great Exhibition by Queen Victoria, 1852

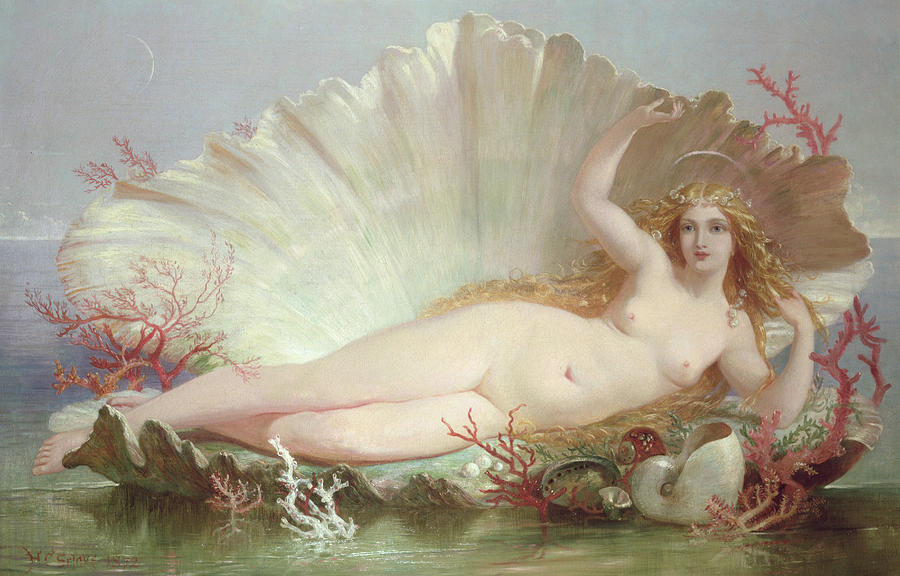
The Birth of Venus by Selous, 1852

In 1818 Selous entered the Royal Academy Schools and also exhibited his first work, a Portrait of a Favourite Cat (location untraced), at the Academy. He submitted animal portraits for the next three years before embarking on human portraiture. His early works were exhibited under the name Slous, but at some time between 1831 and 1838 he adopted the name Selous.

In the 1840s he began to paint historical subjects, initially inspired by the renewed interest in history painting prompted by the New Palace of Westminster cartoon competition for the designs of frescoes on the new building in 1843. In this he submitted a picture of Boadicea Harranguing the Iceni which won a premium of £200 in 1843. He was aided by the knowledge of mural technique he had acquired by working for a panorama painter. Despite the prize, the picture was criticised by one reviewer because the "violence of the action and dashing lights carry us away like the speech of a mob orator."

He painted historical pieces for the rest of his career, for example Cassio Wounded (1874, location untraced), as well as such works as The Opening of The Great Exhibition (see works, below) recording contemporary events.

== Works ==
- The opening of The Great Exhibition, by Queen Victoria on 1 May 1851 depicts the Archbishop of Canterbury offering the benedictory prayer at the opening ceremony. Sir Henry Cole, the first director of the Victoria & Albert Museum, stands in the group on the right.
- Jerusalem in her Grandeur
- The Glorious Charge of the Heavy Brigade depicts the Inniskilling Dragoons and the Scots Greys during the classic cavalry charge at Balaclava, 1855, location untraced.
- 22 original pen-and-ink drawings to John Bunyan's Pilgrim's Progress, London, 1844 or earlier, 22 original pen-and-ink drawings on wove paper
