= Susan K. Phillips =

English poet

Susan Katherine Phillips (1831–1897) was an English poet. She was born in 1831 in Aldborough, where her father, the Rev. George Kelly Holdsworth, was the vicar of the parish. In 1856 she was married to the painter Henry Wyndham Phillips. They lived for many years in Ripon, and often spent the summer months at Whitby. The fishermen of the Yorkshire coast she encountered at Whitby are the subject of many of her poems.

In 1865 her first volume of poetry was published: "Verses and Ballads." Later publications were "Yorkshire Songs and Ballads" (1870), "On the Seaboard" (1878) and "Told in a Coble, and other Poems," (1884).

She died in Torquay on 25 May 1897.
