= Flush toilets at the Great Exhibition =

Toilets at London's 1851 Great Exhibition

The flush toilets at the Great Exhibition of 1851 were the first modern public flush toilets for both men and women, designed by sanitary engineer and public toilet crusader George Jennings. While the urinals for men at the Great Exhibition were free, good revenue was had from the 22 men's and 47's women's "Monkey Closets". Jennings coined the term "Monkey Closets" from industry slang, because side on the plumbing looked like a monkey squating.

== Usage ==
Over the six month course of the Exhibition, 827,280 visitors paid the penny fee to use them; for which they got a clean seat, use of a towel and comb, and a shoe shine. "To spend a penny" became a euphemism for going to the toilet.

Jennings who had popularized the flush toilet to the middle class at his business manufacturing water closets, salt-glaze drainage, sanitary pipes and sanitaryware at Parkstone Pottery in the 1840s, installed his Monkey Closets in the Retiring Rooms of the Crystal Palace. When the exhibition finished and moved to Sydenham, the toilets were to be closed down. However, Jennings persuaded the organisers to keep the toilets even after the exhibition was dismantled. They went on to earn more than £1000 (equivalent to £137,200 in 2023) per year.

== Legacy ==
Such was their popularity, with many visitors return to their home cities requesting public conveniences, the first public lavatories were opened by the Royal Society of Arts in 1852 in central London in an attempt to prove they could become financially self sustaining. However, these failed. It was not until 1889 that London’s first municipal public convenience for women was built, located underground in Piccadilly Circus. The idea of building conveniences underground was first proposed by George Jennings in 1858.

Remains of Jennings' 165-year-old Monkey Closets from the Exhibition were uncovered in London's Hyde Park in 2016. The discovery was made by workmen creating a new pump house as part of a major water project on the site of the former Great Exhibition of 1851. They are believed to be one of the few structures from the temporary exhibition to have ever been uncovered.

Public flush toilets marked a significant step in the emancipation of women, as it allowed them to travel further from home without having to worry about finding an accessible toilet, the so-called "urinary leash" or "loo leash". It has been argued by Prof. Clara Greed that the lack of such toilets in the Victorian era was actually intentional, and a mechanism to control the movement of woman and exclude them from public spaces.
