= Great Exhibition =

1st world's fair in 1851 in London, England

1851 London
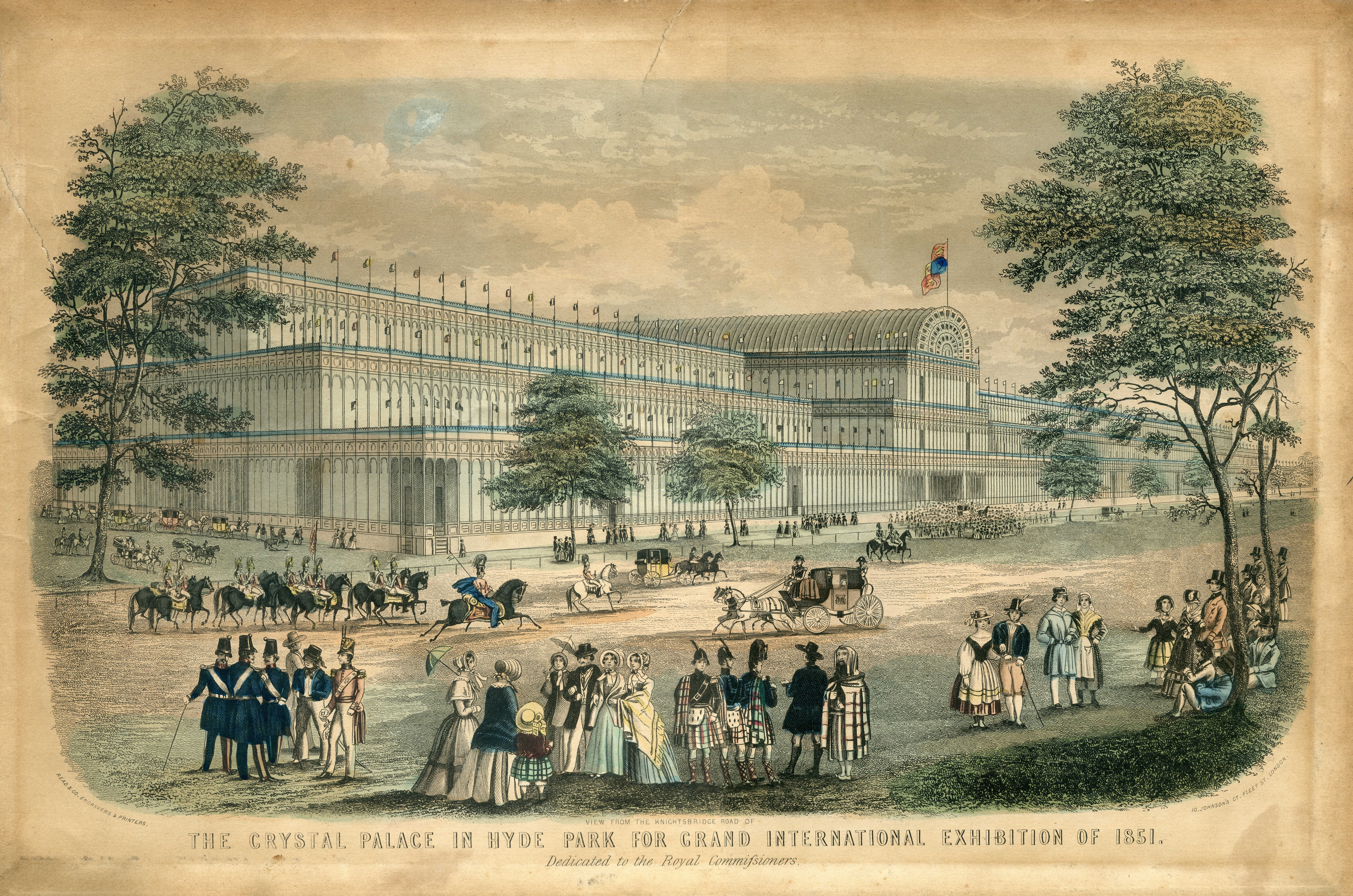
- The Great Exhibition 1851

Overview
- BIE-class: Universal exposition
- Category: Historical Expo
- Name: 1851 London
- Building(s): The Crystal Palace
- Area: 10.4 ha (26 acres)
- Invention(s): Telegraph, vulcanised rubber
- Visitors: 6,039,722

Location
- Country: United Kingdom of Great Britain
- City: London
- Venue: Hyde Park, London
- Coordinates: 51°30′11″N 0°10′12″W

Timeline
- Opening: May 1 – October 15, 1851 (5 months and 2 weeks)
- Closure: 15 October 1851; 175 years ago

Universal expositions
- Next: Exposition Universelle in Paris

The Great Exhibition of the Works of Industry of All Nations, also known as the Great Exhibition or the Crystal Palace Exhibition (in reference to the temporary structure in which it was held), was an international exhibition that took place in Hyde Park, London, from 1 May to 15 October 1851. It was the first in a series of world's fairs, exhibitions of culture and industry that became popular in the 19th century. The event was organised by Henry Cole and Prince Albert of Saxe-Coburg and Gotha.

Famous people of the time attended the Great Exhibition, including Charles Darwin, Karl Marx, C.H. Spurgeon, Michael Faraday (who assisted with the planning and judging of exhibits), Samuel Colt, John Mercer, members of the Orléanist royal family and the writers Charlotte Brontë, Charles Dickens, Lewis Carroll, George Eliot, Alfred Tennyson, and William Makepeace Thackeray. The future Arts and Crafts proponent William Morris, then a teenager, later said he refused to attend the Exhibition on the grounds of taste. Exhibits showcased include the first public flush toilets invented by George Jennings.

The opening music, under the superintendence of William Sterndale Bennett, was directed by George Thomas Smart. Organised by Howard Staunton, the first international chess tournament took place at the Exhibition. The world's first soft drink, Schweppes, was the official sponsor of the event.

== Background ==
The Great Exhibition was organised by Prince Albert, Henry Cole, Francis Henry, George Wallis, Wentworth Dilke, and other members of the Royal Society for the Encouragement of Arts, Manufactures and Commerce as a celebration of modern industrial technology and design. The Society had only received its royal charter in 1847. It was arguably a response to the highly effective French Industrial Exposition of 1844: indeed, its prime motive was for Britain to make "clear to the world its role as industrial leader". Prince Albert, Queen Victoria's consort, was an enthusiastic promoter of the self-financing exhibition; the government was persuaded to form the Royal Commission for the Exhibition of 1851 to establish the viability of hosting such an exhibition. Subscription Committees across the United Kingdom accepted donations from ordinary citizens, who contributed to its financing. The royal family was initially hesitant of bringing crowds from Europe into London during a revolutionary period, which could target them, as well as the royal family's clashes with the Chartists in the United Kingdom.

Queen Victoria visited three times with her family, and 34 times on her own. Although the Great Exhibition was a platform on which countries from around the world could display their achievements, Britain sought to prove its own superiority. The British exhibits at the Great Exhibition "held the lead in almost every field where strength, durability, utility and quality were concerned, whether in iron and steel, machinery or textiles." Britain also sought to provide the world with the hope of a better future. Europe had just emerged from "two difficult decades of political and social upheaval," and now Britain hoped to show that technology, particularly its own, was the key to a better future.

Sophie Forgan says of the exhibition that "Large, piled-up 'trophy' exhibits in the central avenue revealed the organisers' priorities; they generally put art or colonial raw materials in the most prestigious place. Technology and moving machinery were popular, especially working exhibits." She also notes that visitors "could watch the entire process of cotton production from spinning to finished cloth. Scientific instruments were found in class X, and included electric telegraphs, microscopes, air pumps and barometers, as well as musical, horological and surgical instruments."

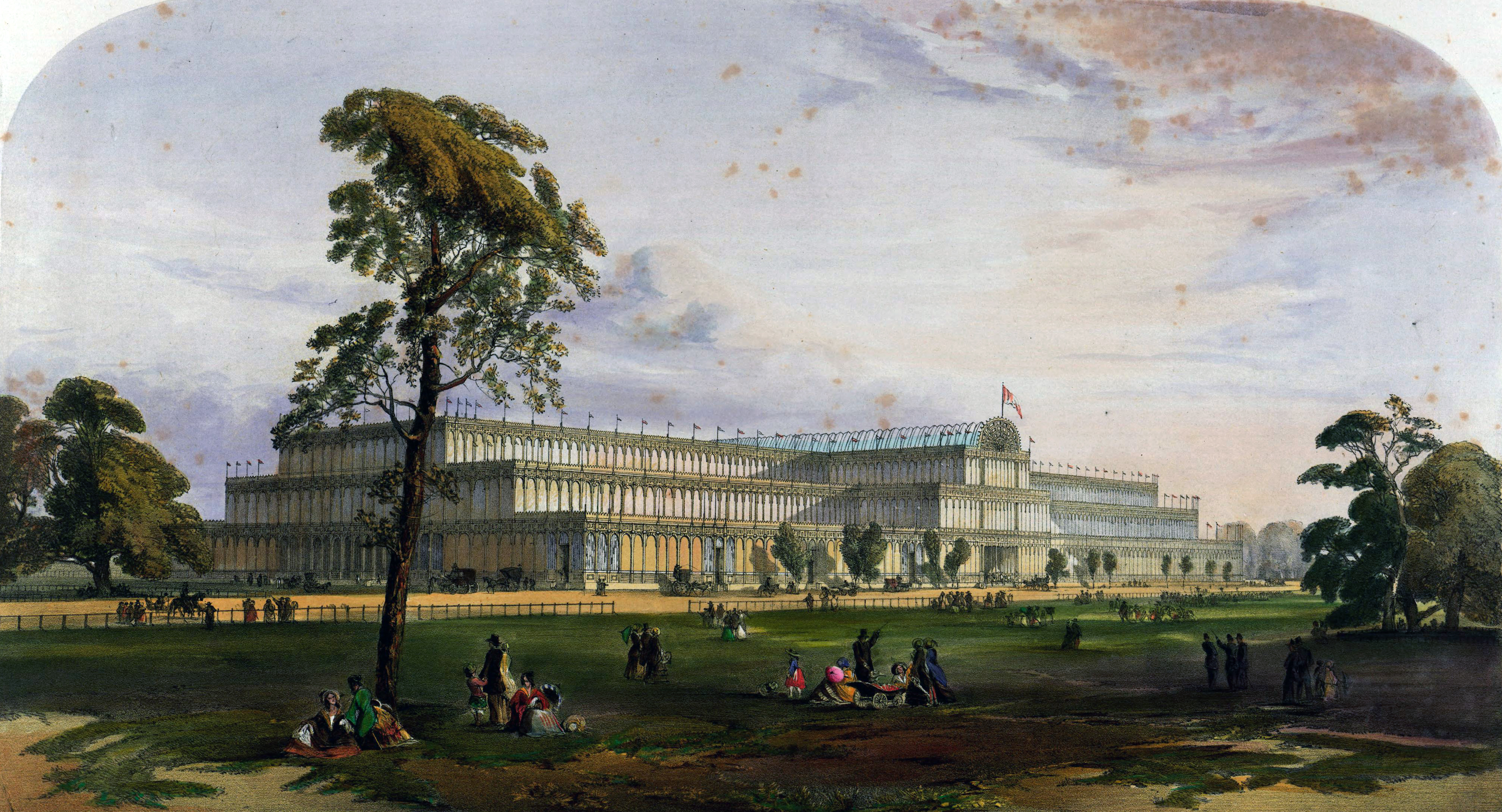
The Crystal Palace in Hyde Park, London, in 1851

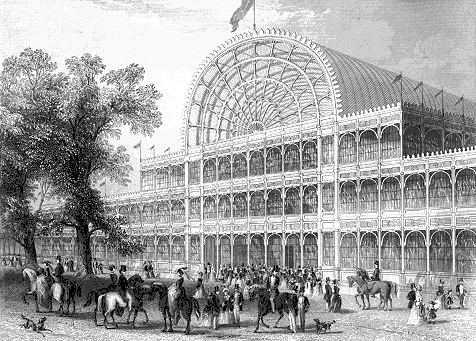
The front door of the Great Exhibition

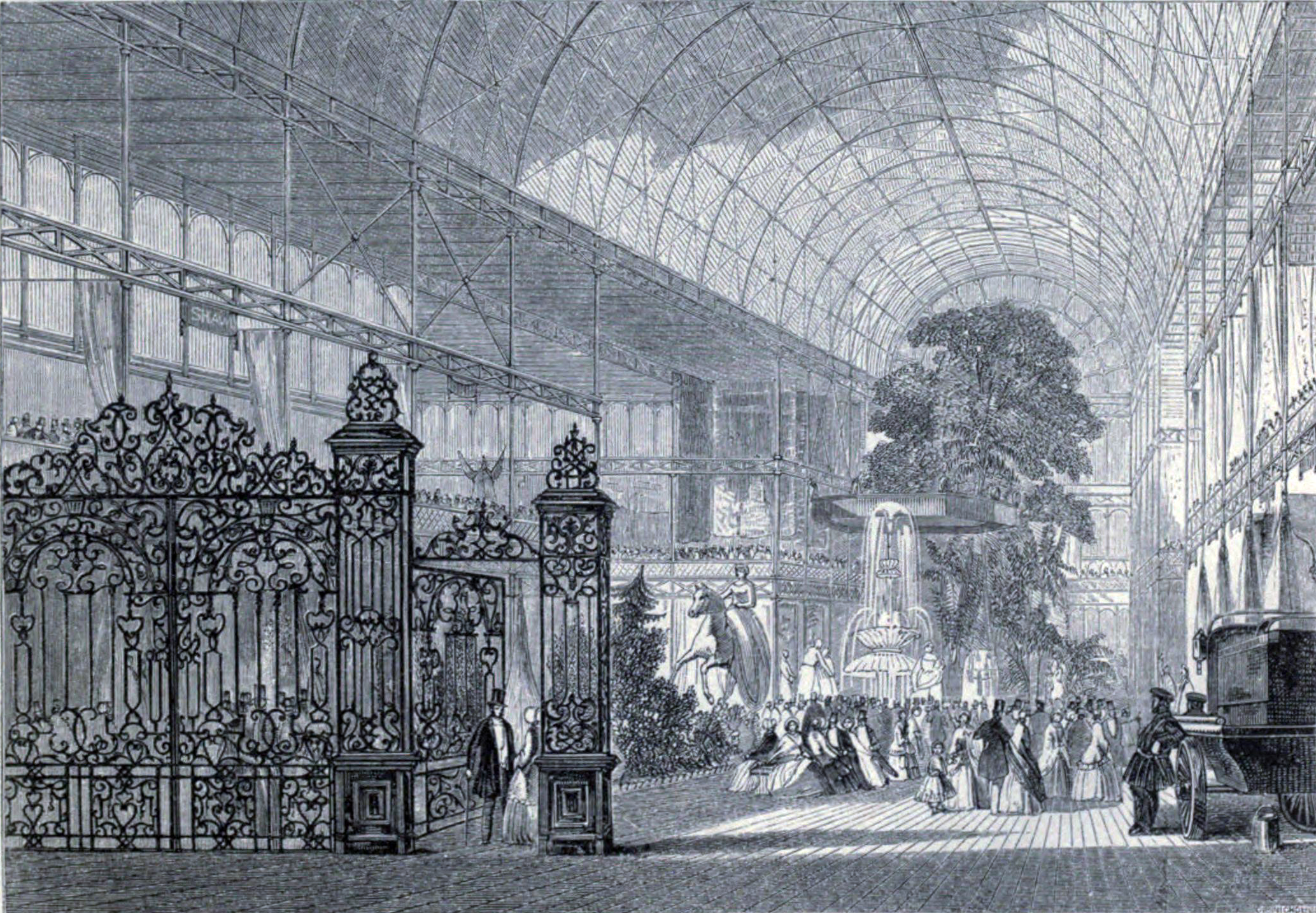
Paxton's Crystal Palace enclosed full-grown trees in Hyde Park.

A special building, or "The Great Shalimar", was built to house the show. It was designed by Joseph Paxton with support from structural engineer Charles Fox, the committee overseeing its construction including Isambard Kingdom Brunel, and went from its organisation to the grand opening in just nine months. The building was architecturally adventurous, drawing on Paxton's experience designing greenhouses for the sixth Duke of Devonshire. It took the form of a massive glass house, 1848 feet long by 454 feet wide (about 563 metres by 138 metres) and was constructed from cast iron-frame components and glass made almost exclusively in Birmingham and Smethwick. From the interior, the building's large size was emphasized with trees and statues; this served not only to add beauty to the spectacle, but also to demonstrate man's triumph over nature. The Crystal Palace was an enormous success, considered an architectural marvel, but also an engineering triumph that showed the importance of the exhibition itself. The building was later moved and re-erected in 1854 in enlarged form at Sydenham Hill in south London, an area that was renamed Crystal Palace. It was destroyed by fire on 30 November 1936.

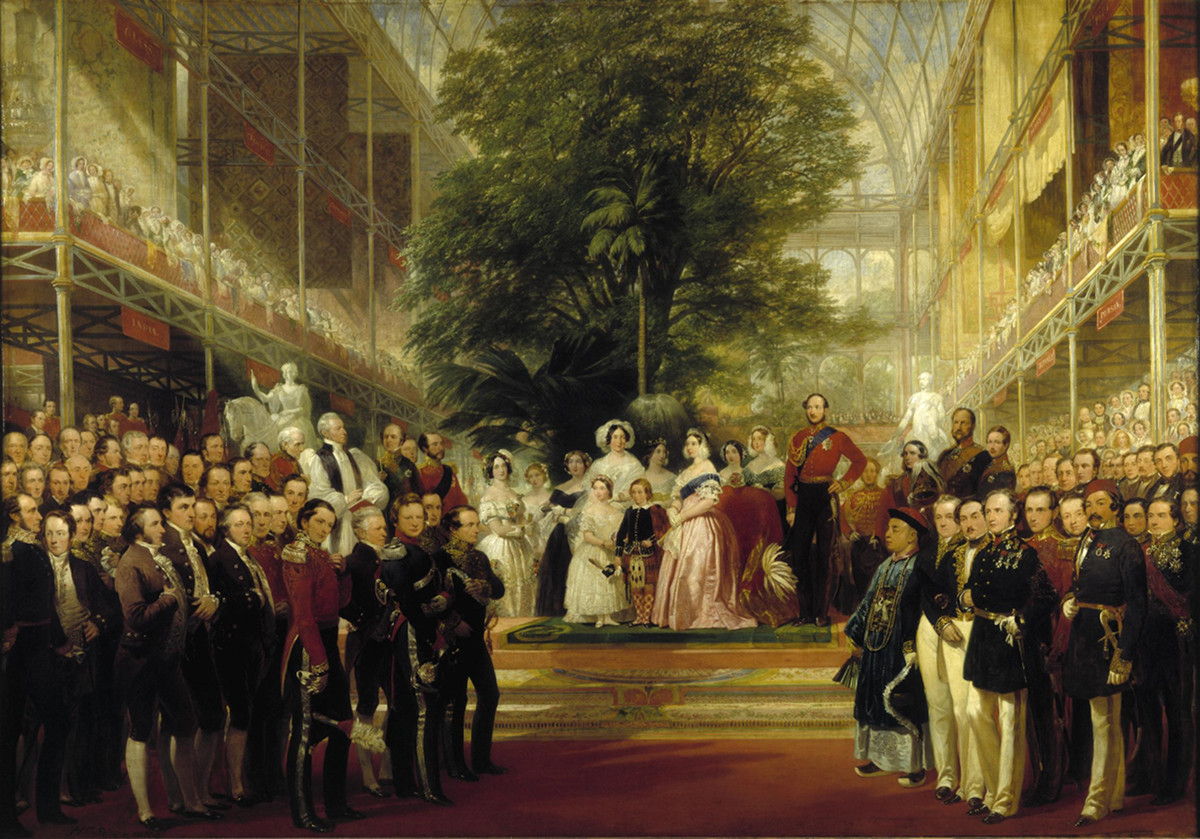
The Opening of the Great Exhibition by Queen Victoria by Henry Courtney Selous

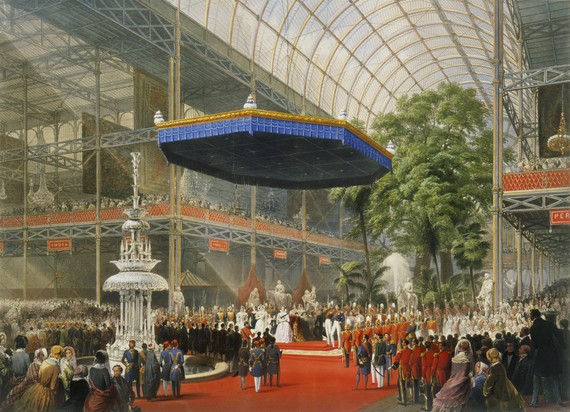
Queen Victoria opens the Great Exhibition in The Crystal Palace in Hyde Park, London, in 1851.

Six million people—equivalent to a third of the entire population of England and Wales at the time—visited the Great Exhibition, most commoners paying an entrance fee, who were overwhelmingly responsible for its financial success. The average daily attendance was 42,831 with a peak of 109,915 on 7 October. Thomas Cook arranged travel to the event for 150,000 people and it was important in his company's development. The event made a surplus of £186,000 (£33,221,701.65 in 2023), which was used to found the Victoria and Albert Museum, the Science Museum and the Natural History Museum. They were all built in the area to the south of the exhibition, nicknamed Albertopolis, alongside the Imperial Institute. The remaining surplus was used to set up an educational trust to provide grants and scholarships for industrial research; it continues to do so today.

The exhibition caused controversy as its opening approached. Some conservatives feared that the mass of visitors might become a revolutionary mob. The English-born Ernest Augustus, King of Hanover, shortly before his death, wrote to Lord Strangford about it:

The folly and absurdity of the Queen in allowing this trumpery must strike every sensible and well-thinking mind, and I am astonished the ministers themselves do not insist on her at least going to Osborne during the Exhibition, as no human being can possibly answer for what may occur on the occasion. The idea ... must shock every honest and well-meaning Englishman. But it seems everything is conspiring to lower us in the eyes of Europe.

In modern times, the Great Exhibition is a symbol of the Victorian Age, and its thick catalogue, illustrated with steel engravings, is a primary source for High Victorian design. The Albert Memorial to the exhibition, crowned with a statue of Prince Albert, is located behind the Royal Albert Hall. It is inscribed with statistics from the exhibition, including the number of visitors and exhibitors (British and foreign), and the profit made.

A range of medals were produced and awarded to exhibitors, jurists and providers of services.

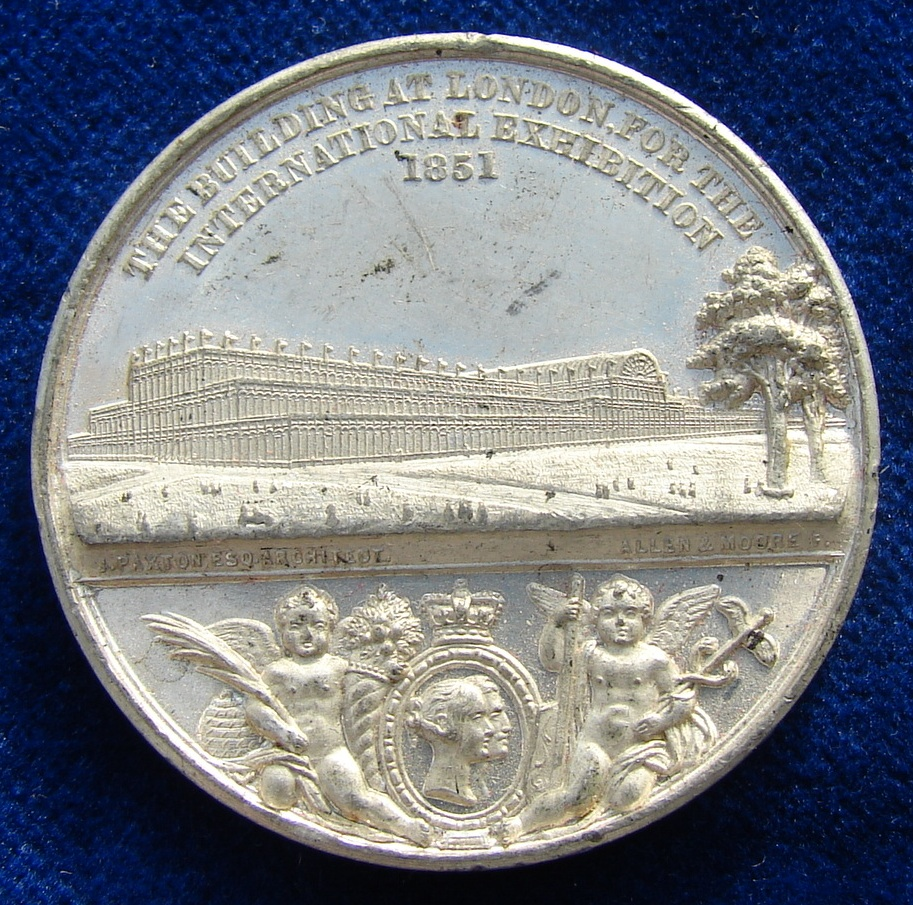
1851 medal The Crystal Palace in London by Allen & Moore, obverse

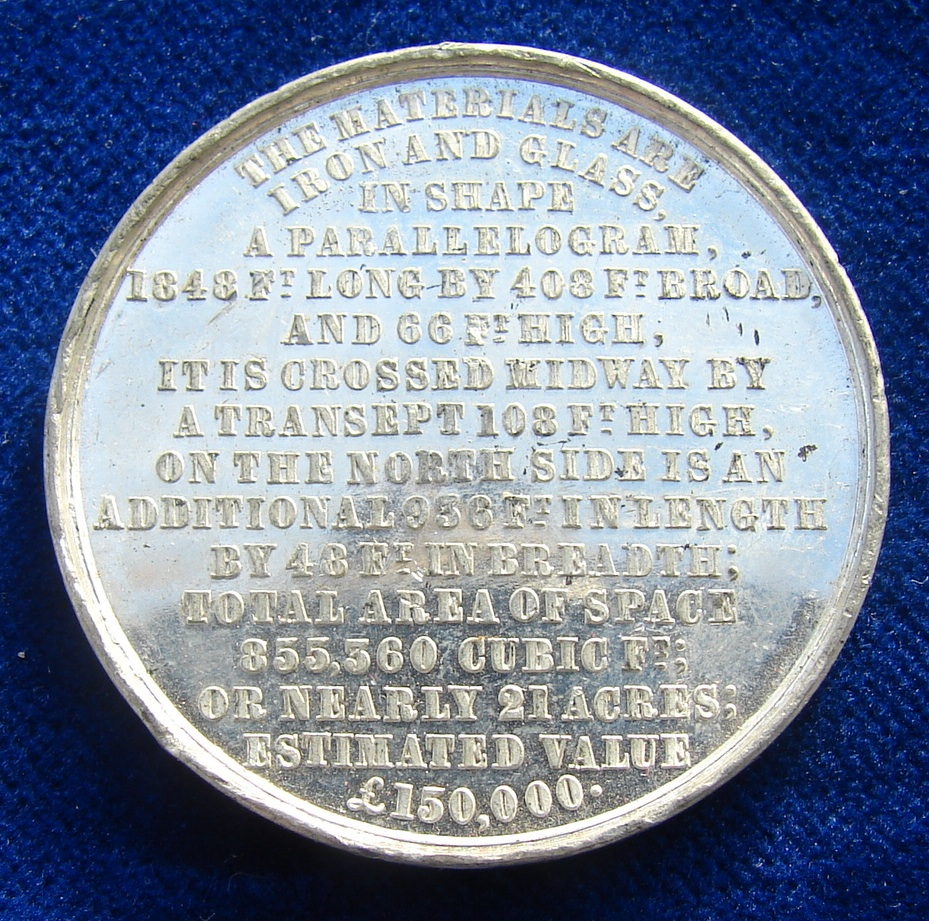
1851 medal The Crystal Palace in London by Allen & Moore, reverse

== Exhibits ==
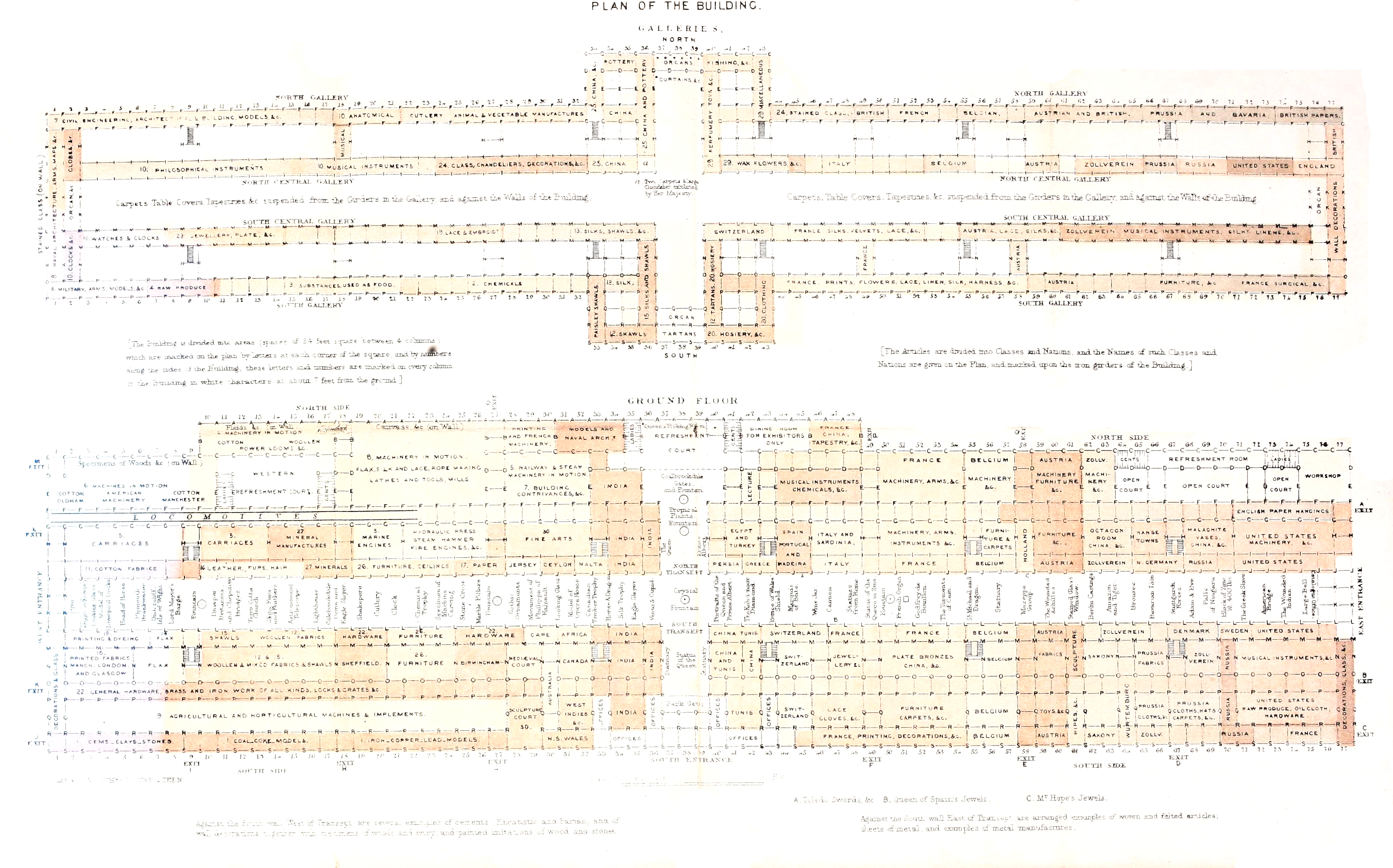
Plan of the exhibition

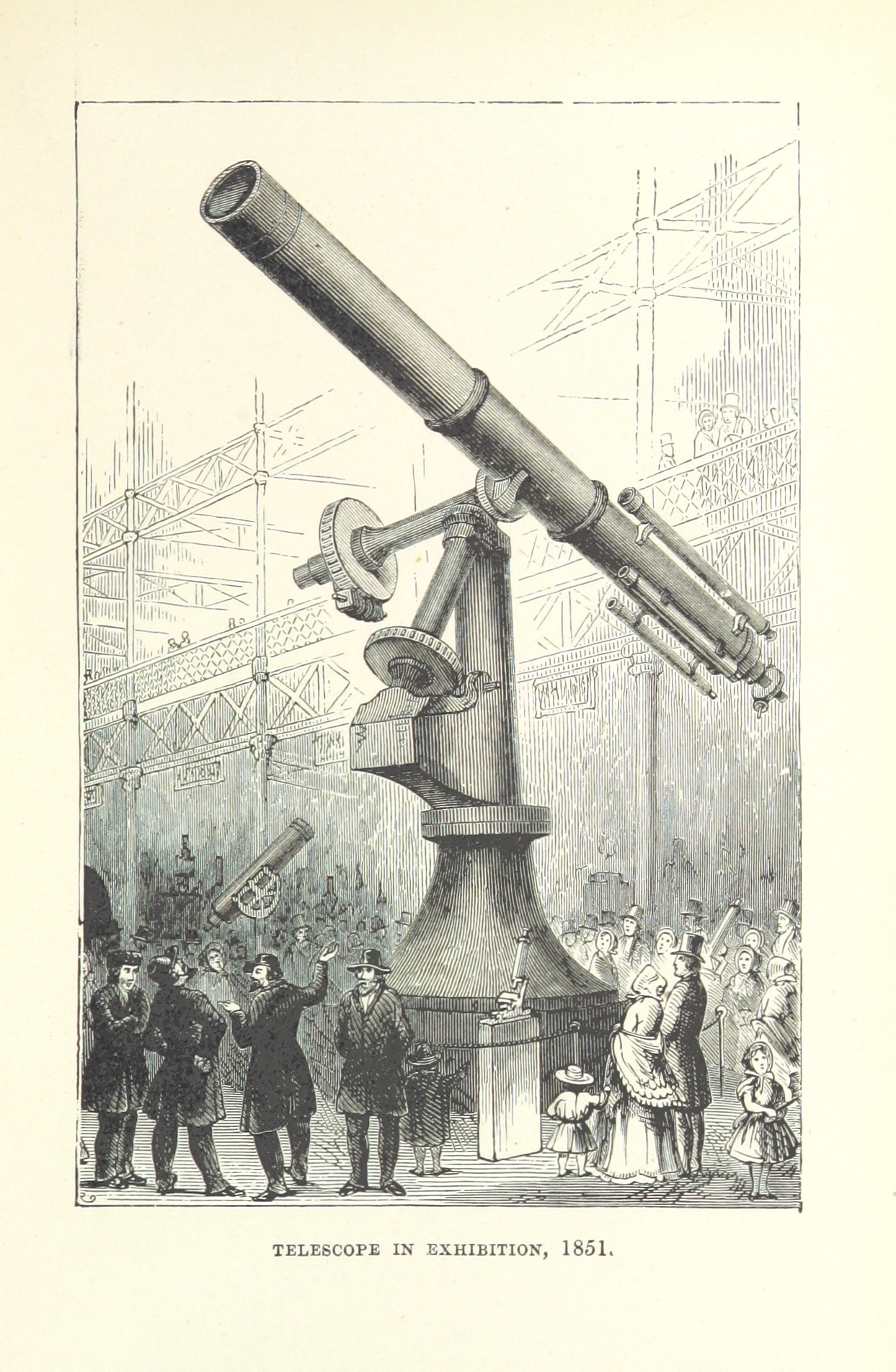
A telescope at the 1851 exhibit

The official descriptive and illustrated catalogue of the event lists exhibitors not only from throughout Britain but also from its "Colonies and Dependencies" and 44 "Foreign States". Numbering 13,000 in total, the exhibits included a Jacquard loom, an envelope machine, kitchen appliances, steel-making displays and a reaping machine that was sent from the United States.

- The Mintons stand exhibited ceramics including majolica.
- The Koh-i-Noor, meaning the "Mountain of Light", the world's largest known diamond at the time, was one of the most popular attractions of the India exhibit.
- The Daria-i-Noor, one of the largest white diamonds in the world, was shown.
- The early 8th-century Tara Brooch, discovered only in 1850, was exhibited by the Dublin jeweller George Waterhouse along with a display of his Celtic Revival jewellery.
- Alfred Charles Hobbs used the exhibition to demonstrate the inadequacy of several respected door locks.
- Frederick Bakewell demonstrated a precursor to the fax machine.
- Mathew Brady was awarded a medal for his daguerreotypes.
- William Chamberlin, Jr. of Sussex exhibited what may have been the world's first voting machine, which counted votes automatically and employed an interlocking system to prevent over-voting.
- The first modern public flush toilets invented by George Jennings were installed at the exhibition, with 827,280 visitors paying the penny fee to use them. The toilets remained even after the exhibition was dismantled. "Spending a penny" became a euphemism for using a toilet. Such was their popularity the first public lavatories opened in 1852.
- Firearms manufacturer Samuel Colt demonstrated his prototype for the 1851 Colt Navy and also his older Walker and Dragoon revolvers.
- The Tempest prognosticator, a barometer using leeches, was demonstrated.
- The America's Cup yachting event was instigated with a race held in conjunction with the Great Exhibition.
- Gold ornaments and silver enamelled handicrafts fabricated by the Sunar caste from Sind, British India.
- C.C. Hornung of Copenhagen, Denmark, showed his single-cast iron frame for a piano, the first made in Europe.
- "The Trophy Telescope", so called because it was considered the "trophy" of the exhibition, was shown. Its main lens of 11 inches (280 mm) aperture and 16 feet (4.9 m) focal length was manufactured by Ross of London. The German equatorial mounting was made by Ransome & May of Ipswich.
- The instrument maker J. S. Marratt exhibited a five-foot achromatic telescope and a transit theodolite used in surveying, tunnelling, and for astronomical purposes.
- Asprey exhibited a kingwood and ormolu mounted lady's dressing case with silver-gilt contents bearing the "Annie" cipher.
- The emphasis of the New Zealand exhibit featured natural resources, as well as crafted items made by Māori, such as flax baskets, carved wooden objects, eel traps, mats, fish hooks and hand clubs.

== Admission fees ==
Admission prices to the Crystal Palace varied according to the date of visit, with ticket prices decreasing as the parliamentary season drew to an end and London traditionally emptied of wealthy individuals. Prices varied from two guineas (£200 in 2015) (three guineas for a man) for a season ticket, or £1 per day (for the first two days only), then reducing to five shillings per day (until 22 May). The admission price was then further reduced to one shilling (£4 in 2015), per day—except on Fridays, when it was set at two shillings and six pence, and on Saturdays when it remained at five shillings. The one-shilling ticket proved most successful among the industrial classes, with four and a half million shillings (£20,000,000 in 2015) being taken from attendees in this manner. Two thousand five hundred tickets were printed for the opening day, all of which were bought.

To attract future customers from the working classes, the newly expanding railways offered highly discounted tickets for people to travel from distant parts of the country, and special rates were offered to parties, often led by the local vicar. Those too poor to travel lined up by the rail tracks to watch the long trains of open carriages steaming past.

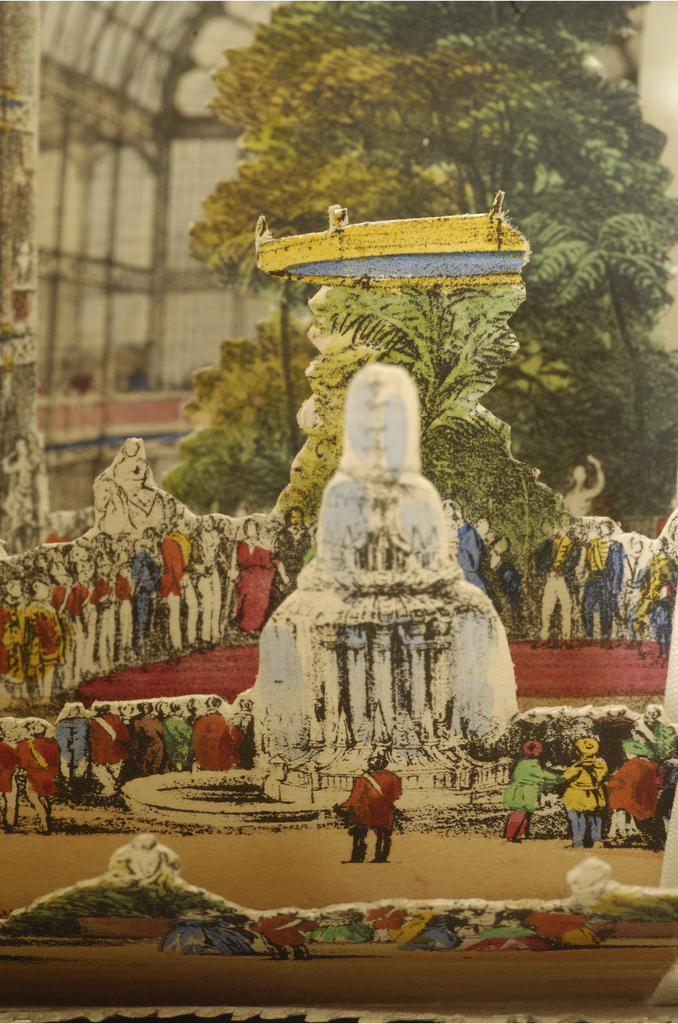
Lane's Telescopic View The Ceremony of Her Majesty Opening the Great Exhibition Inside view grand opening by Queen Victoria

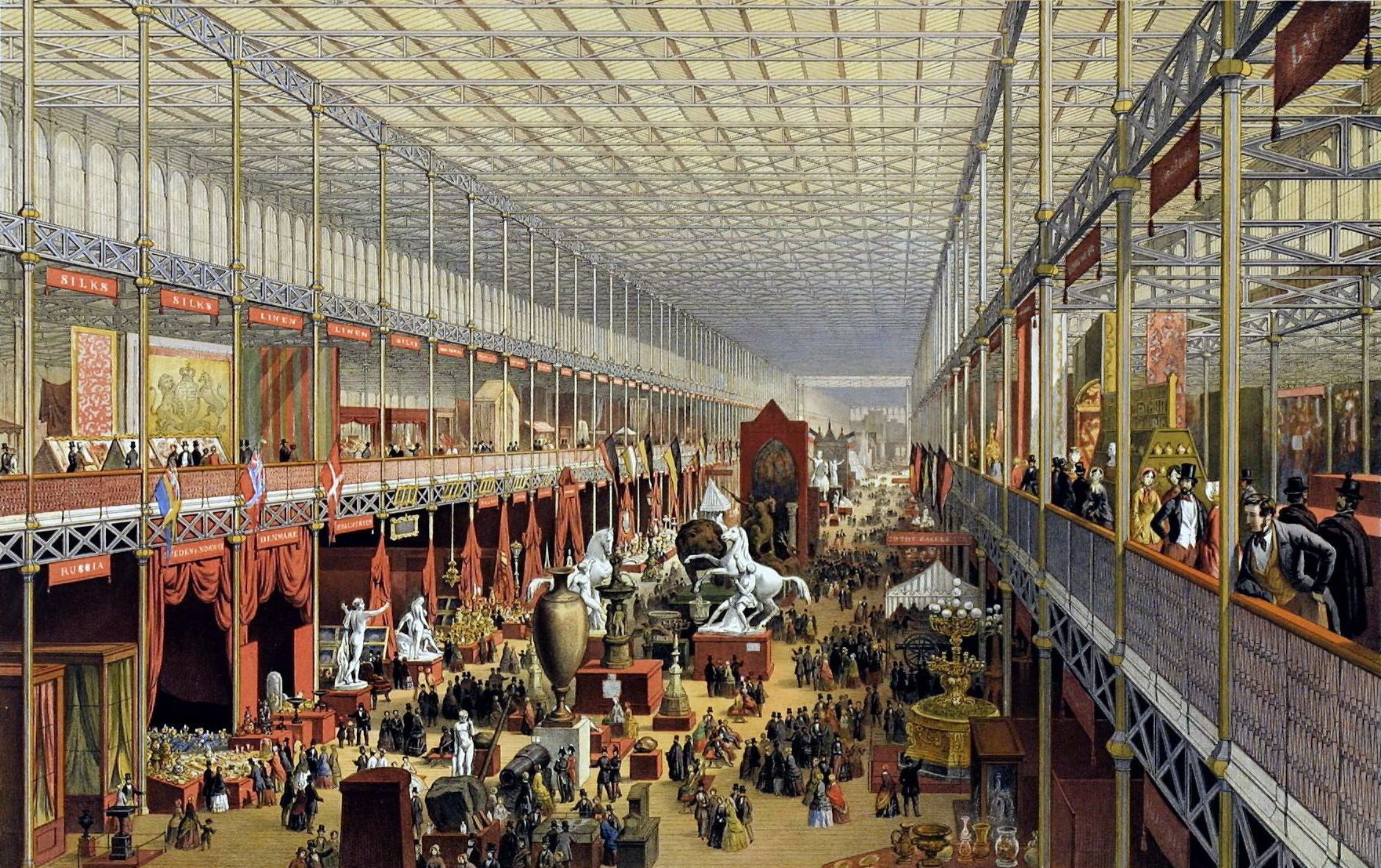
The enormous Crystal Palace went from plans to grand opening in just nine months.

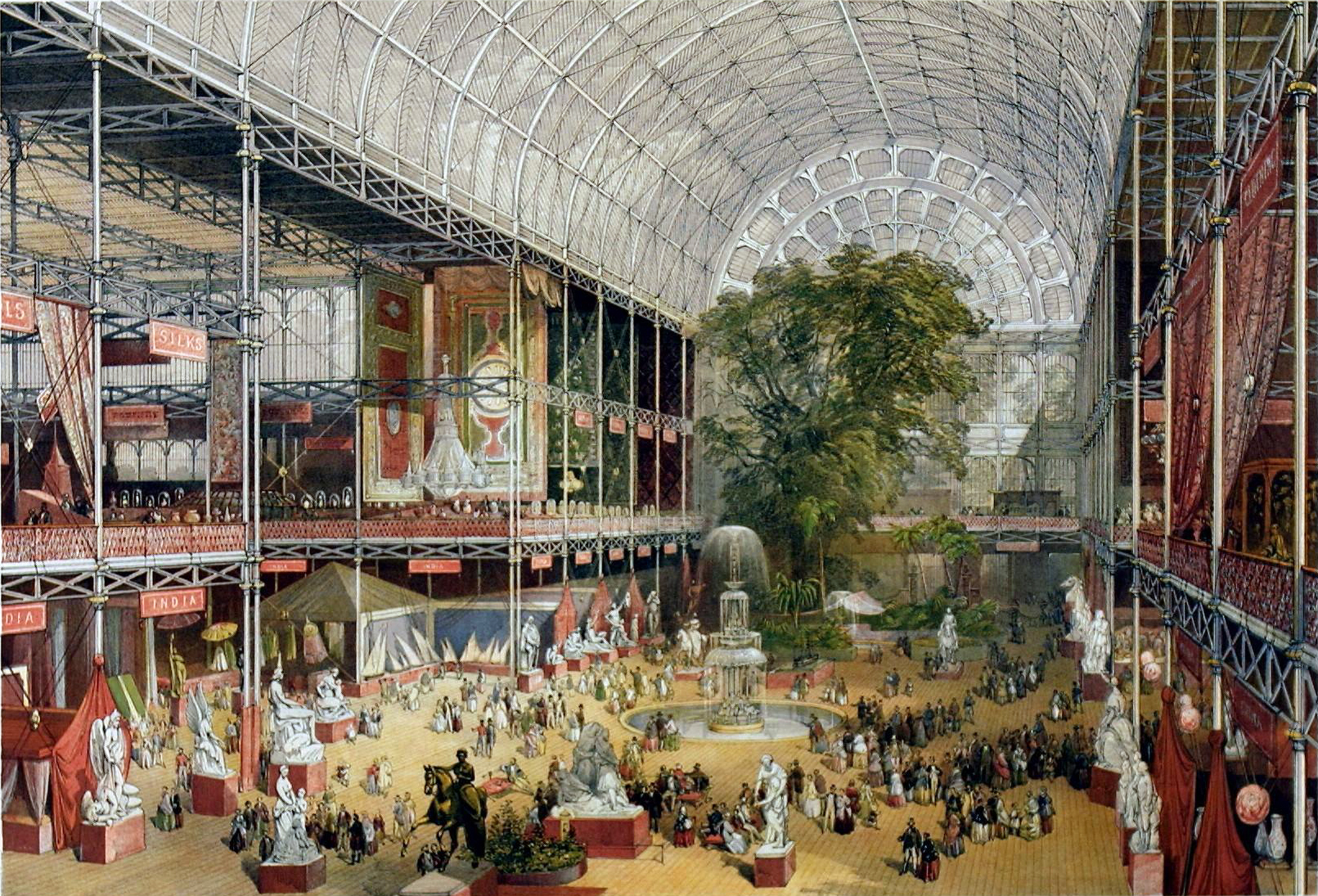
Exhibition interior

== Stereoscopic views ==
The Great Exhibition of 1851 encouraged the production of souvenirs. Several manufacturers produced stereoscope cards that provided a three-dimensional view of the exhibition. These paper souvenirs were printed lithographic cards which were hand-coloured and held together by cloth to give a three-dimensional view of the event. They offered a miniature view of the Crystal Palace when one viewed the cards through the peep holes on the front cover. Visitors purchased these souvenirs so that they could relive the experience of attending.

== See also ==
- Bain's facsimile
- List of world's fairs
- 1862 International Exhibition, held in London.
- Festival of Britain
- Great Exhibition Bay
- Prince Albert's Model Cottage
