= Henry Wyndham Phillips =

English portrait artist (c.1820–1868)

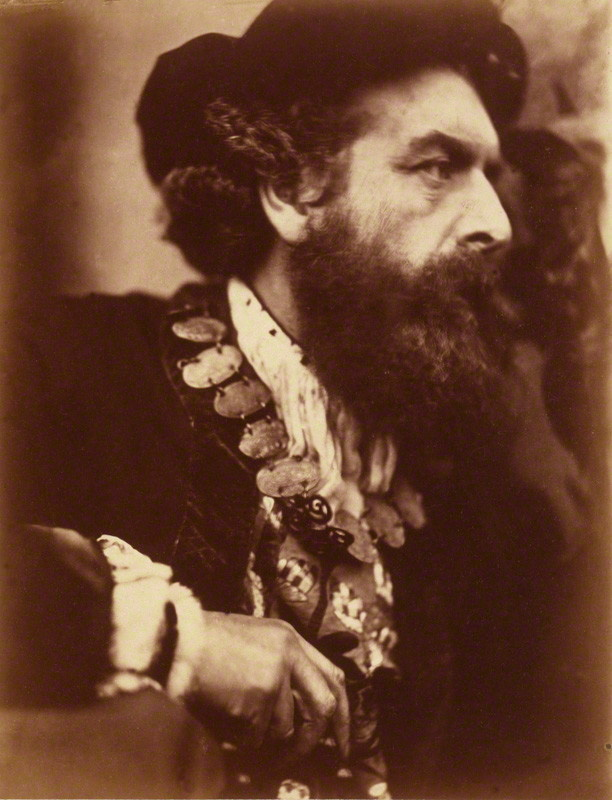
- Photograph by David Wilkie Wynfield (1864)
- Born: c. 1820; London, England
- Died: 8 December 1868 (aged 48); Sydenham, Kent
- Known for: Portrait painting
- Spouse: Susan K. Phillips

Henry Wyndham Phillips (c. 1820 – 8 December 1868) was a British artist and portrait painter. Although he produced and exhibited a small number of paintings of scriptural subjects early on in his career, he spent most of his life working as a portrait artist. He was born in London, the younger son of the portraitist Thomas Phillips, from whom he received most of his art tuition. When his father died in 1845, he bequeathed Henry all of his painting materials and the use of his painting rooms at 8 George Street, Hanover Square in central London, where Henry is believed to have lived for the rest of his life.

He was a very popular and sought-after portrait artist. His commissions included the portraits of actor Charles Kean (as Louis XI) for the Garrick Club, Dr William Prout for the Royal College of Physicians, and Robert Stephenson for the Institution of Civil Engineers. Some of his works, including his portrait of the famous archaeologist, Austen Layard, were popular engravings. His works were exhibited at the Royal Academy and the British Institute from 1838 until his death in 1868.

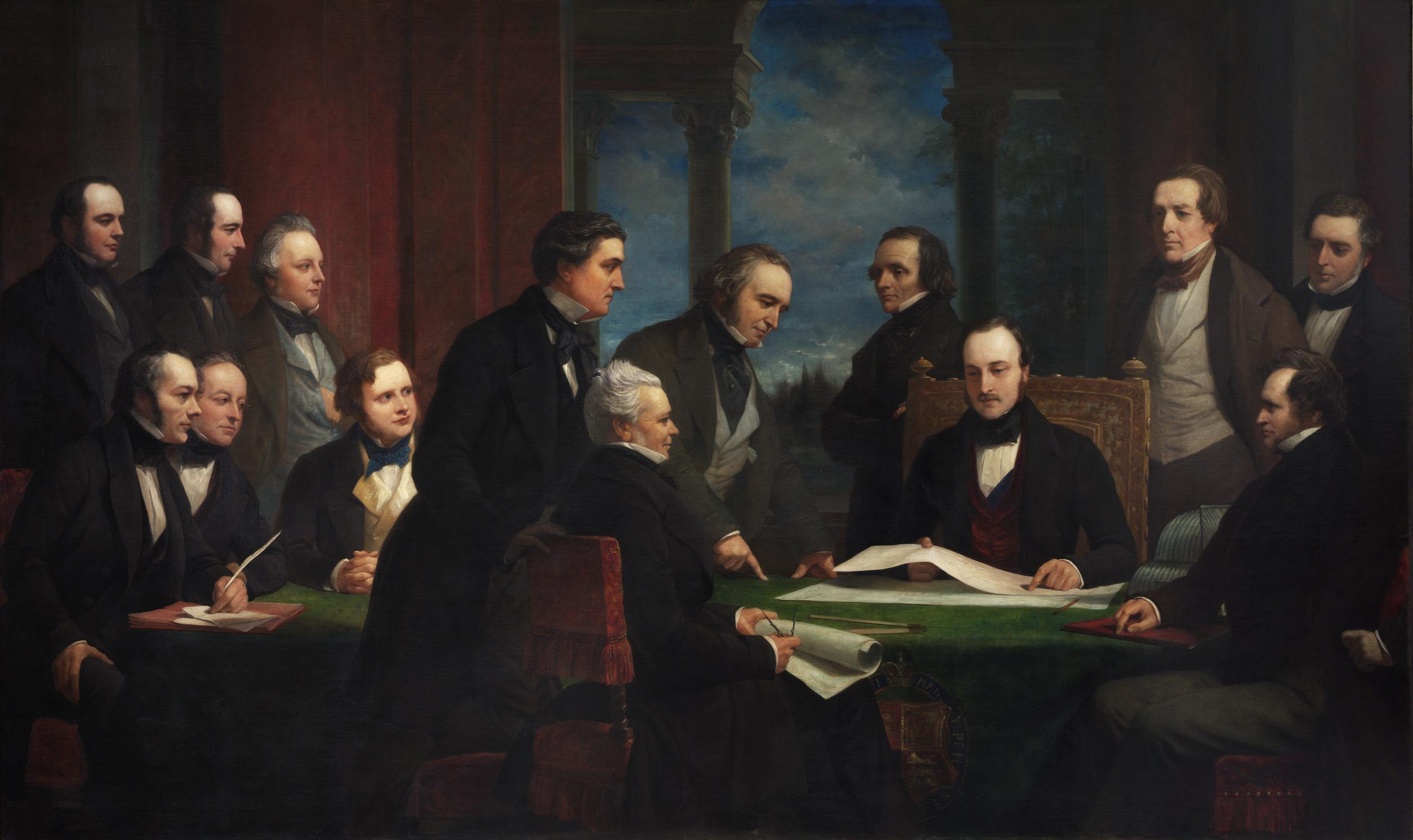
The Royal Commissioners for the Exhibition of 1851

Phillips was a close friend of George Frederic Watts, with whom he was a founding member of London's Cosmopolitan Club (est. 1852), where he was also honorary secretary. He served as secretary of the Artists' General Benevolent Institution for thirteen years. He was also a captain in the Artists Rifles Volunteer Force, which he established in 1860 at his art studio along with fellow founding commander Frederic Leighton.

He married the poet Susan K. Phillips (née Holdsworth) in 1856. He died suddenly on 8 December 1868, in Sydenham, Kent, and was buried at West Norwood Cemetery.
