= Henry Cole (inventor) =

English design advocate (1808–1882)

Sir Henry Cole CB FRSA
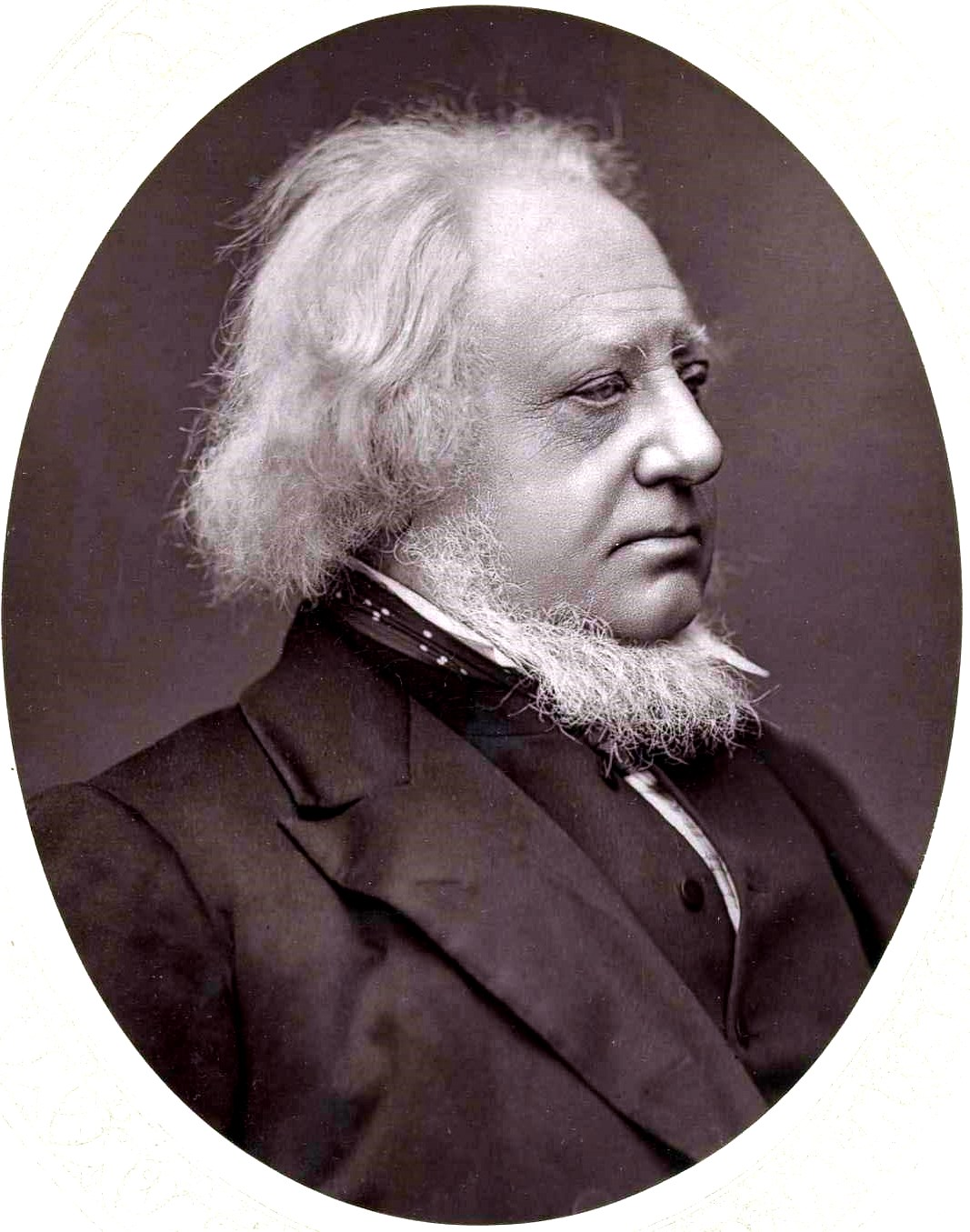
- Woodburytype of Henry Cole by Lock & Whitfield
- Born: 15 July 1808; Bath
- Died: 15 April 1882 (aged 73)
- Education: Christ's Hospital

Signature
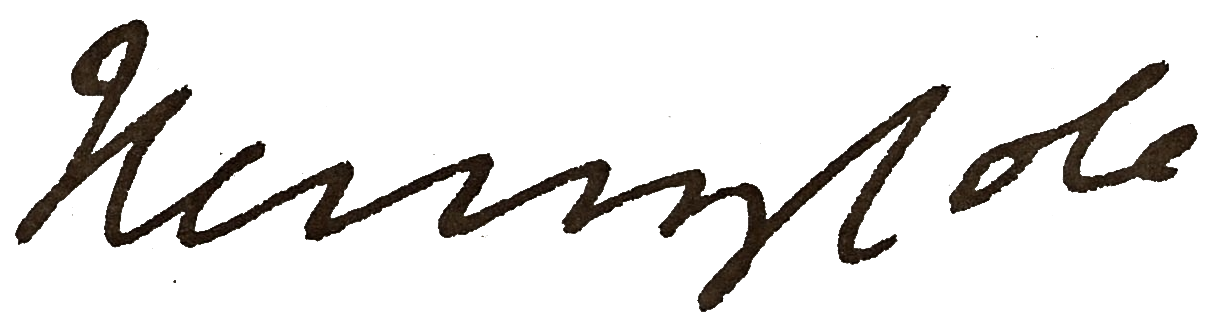

Sir Henry Cole CB FRSA (15 July 1808 – 15 April 1882) was an English civil servant and inventor who facilitated many innovations in commerce, education and the arts in the 19th century in the United Kingdom. Cole is credited with devising the concept of sending greetings cards at Christmas time, introducing the world's first commercial Christmas card in 1843.

== Biography ==
Henry Cole was born in Bath the son of Captain Henry Robert Cole, then of the 1st Dragoon Guards, and his wife Lætitia Dormer. He was sent in 1817 to Christ's Hospital, and upon leaving school in 1823 became clerk to Francis Palgrave, and then a sub-commissioner under the Record Commission. Cole was employed in transcribing records, but found time to study watercolour painting under David Cox, and exhibited sketches at the Royal Academy. He lived with his father in a house belonging to the novelist Thomas Love Peacock, who retained two rooms in it, and became a friend of young Cole. Cole drew for him, helped him in writing critiques of musical performances, and was introduced by him to John Stuart Mill, Charles Buller, and George Grote. The friends used to meet at Grote's house in Threadneedle Street for discussions twice a week. A new Record Commission was issued in 1831, and in 1833 Cole was appointed a sub-commissioner. The secretary, Charles Purton Cooper, quarrelled with the commission, and with Cole, who applied to Charles Buller for protection. A committee of the House of Commons was appointed upon Buller's motion in 1836, which reported against the existing system, and the commission lapsed on the death of William IV on 20 June 1837. Cole wrote many articles in support of Buller. He was appointed by Lord Langdale, who, as Master of the Rolls, administered the affairs of the commission, to take charge of the records of the exchequer of pleas.

The record office was constituted in 1838 under the Public Record Office Act 1838, and Cole became one of the four senior assistant-keepers. He ranged a large mass of records in the Carlton House Riding School, where he was placed for the purpose 2 November 1841. His reports upon the unsuitability of this place contributed to bring about the erection of the building in Fetter Lane (begun in 1851). Cole's duties at the record office did not absorb his whole energy. In 1838, with the leave of his superiors, he became secretary to a committee for promoting postal reform. He edited their organ, the Post Circular, suggested by himself, of which the first number appeared 14 March 1838. He got up petitions and meetings with such energy that Cobden offered to him in 1839 the secretaryship of the Anti-Corn Law League. Parliament granted power to carry out the new postal scheme in August 1839, and the treasury offered premiums for the best proposals as to stamps. Cole gained one of the premiums; he attended the treasury to discuss details, and was employed there till the beginning of 1842 in working out the scheme.

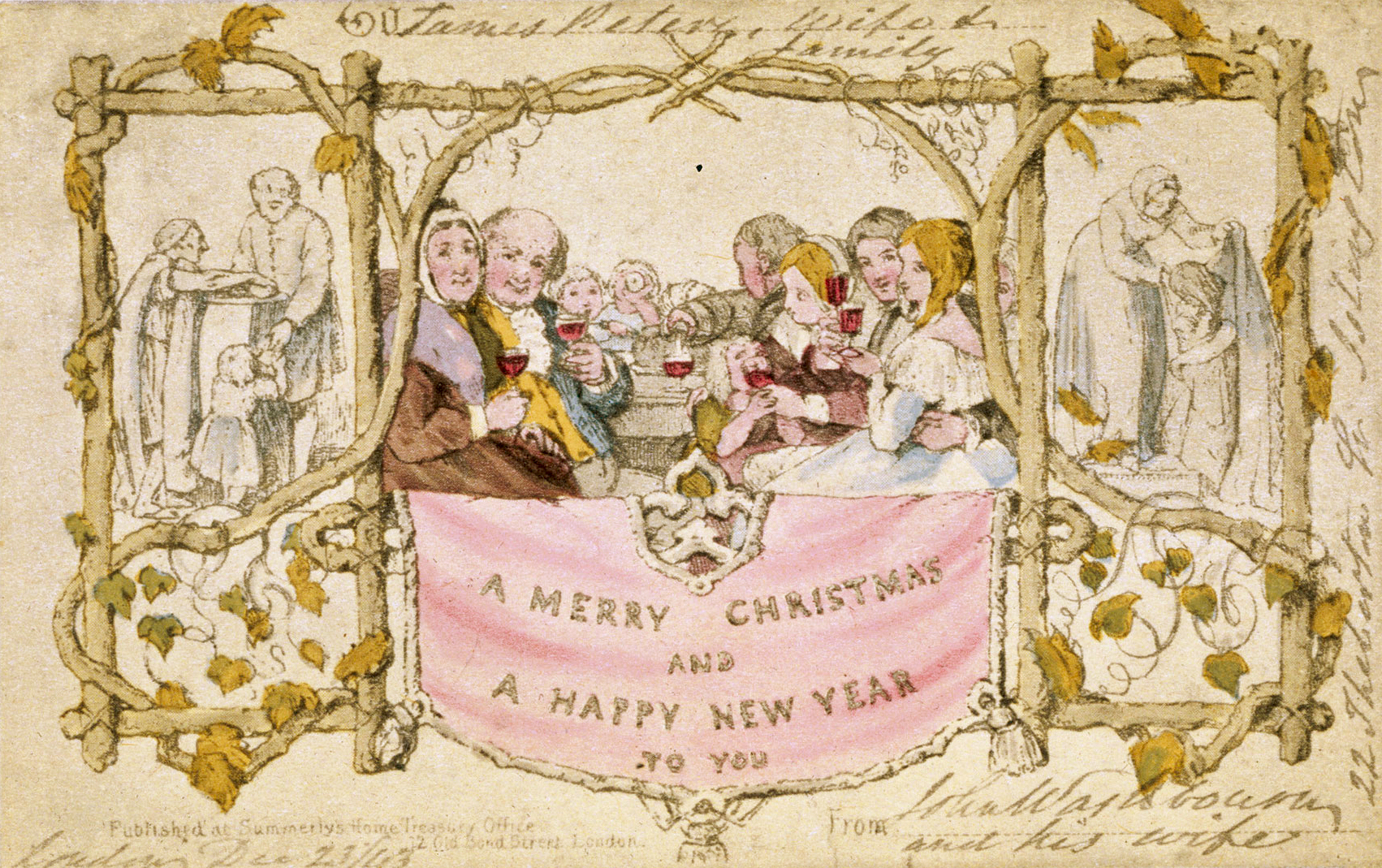
The world's first commercially produced Christmas card, made by artist John Callcott Horsley for Henry Cole in 1843

From 1837 to 1840, he worked as an assistant to Rowland Hill and played a key role in the introduction of the Penny Post. He is sometimes credited with the design of the world's first postage stamp, the Penny Black.

In 1843, Cole introduced the world's first commercial Christmas card, commissioning artist John Callcott Horsley to make the artwork.

== Felix Summerly pseudonym ==
Cole was personally interested in industrial design, and under the pseudonym Felix Summerly designed a number of items which went into production, including a prize-winning teapot manufactured by Minton. As Felix Summerly, he also wrote a series of children's books, including The Veritable History of Whittington and his Cat (1847) The home treasury (1843–1855); A hand-book for the architecture, sculpture, tombs, and decorations of Westminster Abbey (1859); Beauty and the beast: an entirely new edition (1843); [An Alphabet of Quadrupeds (1844); and The pleasant history of Reynard the Fox, told by the pictures by Albert van Everdingen (1843).

== Cole and the exhibitions ==
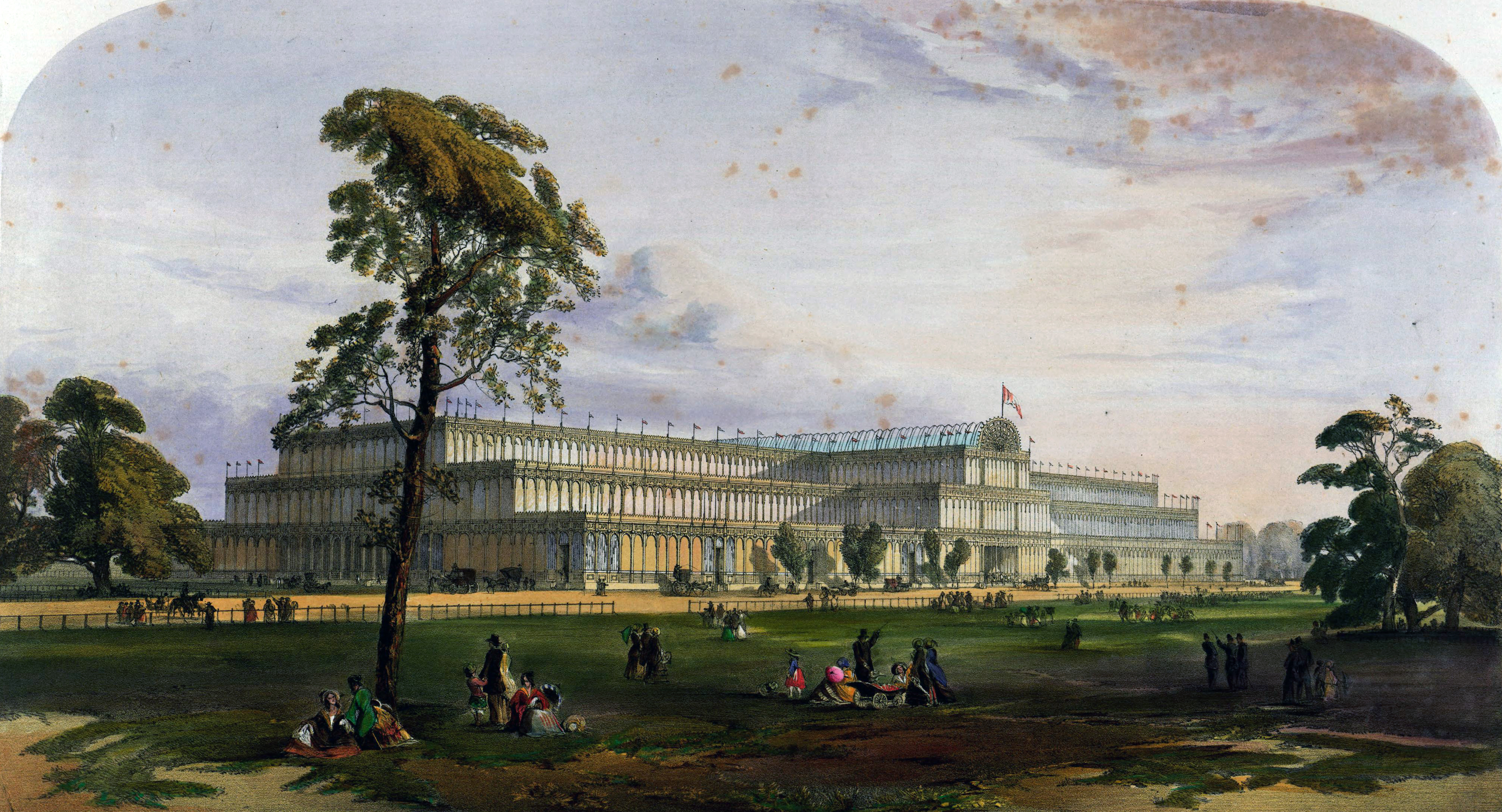
The 1851 Great Exhibition in Hyde Park

Through his membership of the Society for the Encouragement of Arts, Manufactures, and Commerce, Cole lobbied government for support for his campaign to improve standards in industrial design. The backing of Prince Albert was secured, and in 1847 a royal charter was granted to the Royal Society for the Encouragement of Arts, Manufactures and Commerce (RSA). Under the patronage of Prince Albert, Cole organised a successful Exhibition of Art Manufactures in 1847, with enlarged exhibitions following in 1848 and 1849.

Cole visited the 1849 11th Quinquennial Paris Exhibition and noticed the lack of an exhibition open to international participants. He saw that the RSA's planned exhibitions for 1850 and 1851 could be adapted into a larger international exhibition, and he secured the backing of Queen Victoria to establish in 1850 the Royal Commission for the Exhibition of 1851 to manage the new exhibition, under the Presidency of Prince Albert.

The Great Exhibition of the Works of Industry of all Nations was held in the Crystal Palace in Hyde Park, London, from 1 May to 15 October 1851, and was an enormous popular and financial success, partially due to the astute management of Henry Cole.

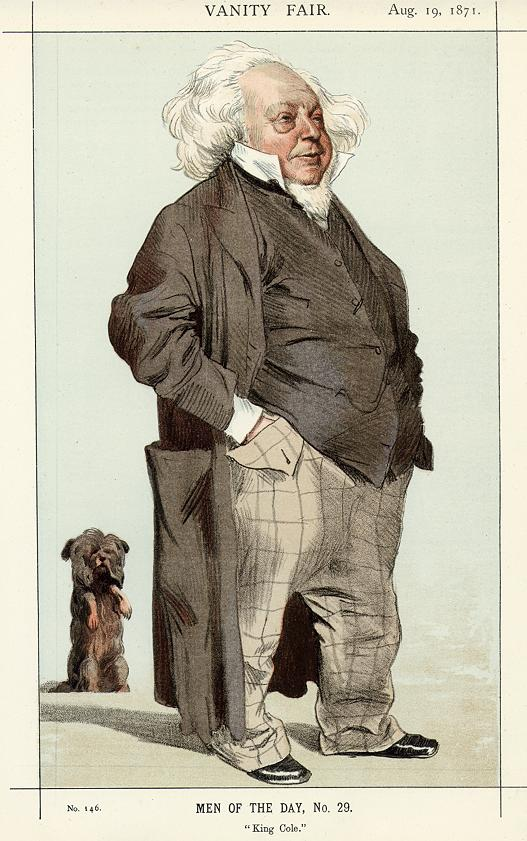
Cole caricatured, as "King Cole", in Vanity Fair, 19 August 1871

== Museums ==
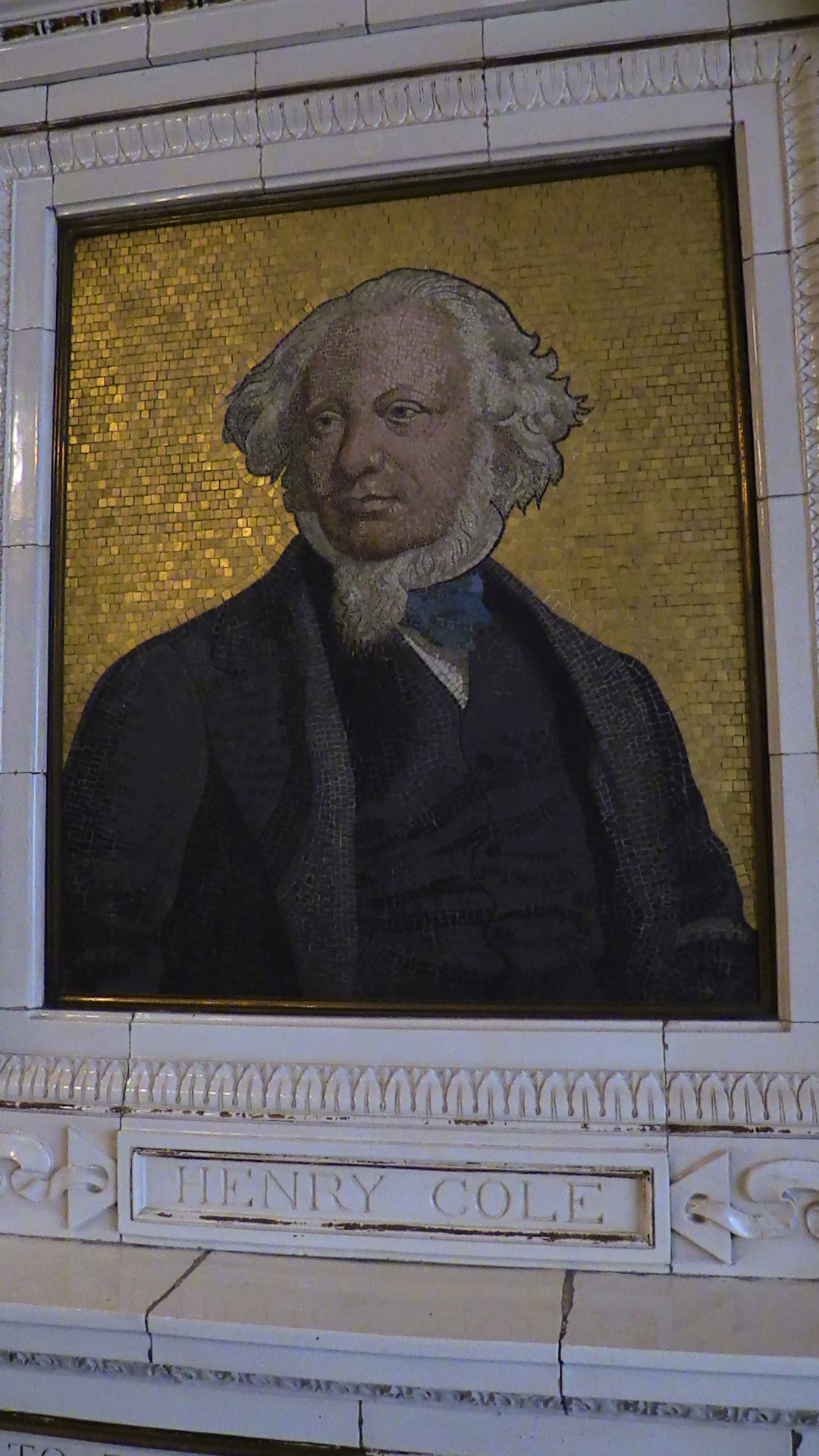
Tiled mural at the V&A

As one of the Commissioners, Cole was instrumental in the decision that the £186,000 surplus from the Great Exhibition would be used for improving science and art education in the United Kingdom. Land was purchased in the South Kensington area and developed as the centre for a number of educational and cultural institutions, known half-jokingly as "Albertopolis". Henry Cole was appointed the first General Superintendent of the Department of Practical Art, set up by the government to improve standards of art and design education in Britain with reference to their applicability to industry. In this capacity he was instrumental in the development of the Victoria and Albert Museum which had begun as the Museum of Ornamental Art in Marlborough House. Cole oversaw its move to its current site, and became first director of what was called South Kensington Museum from 1857 to 1873. In 1974 a part of the museum that was once known as the Huxley Building was renamed the Henry Cole Building; today it forms the Henry Cole Wing of the V&A.

== Honours and legacy ==
Cole was instrumental in the development of the National Art Training School (renamed the Royal College of Art in 1896) and played a part in the establishment of many other South Kensington institutions, such as the Royal College of Music and Imperial College London. In fact, the Imperial College Mathematics Department was formerly based in the Henry Cole Wing on Exhibition Road, before the premises were donated to the Victoria & Albert Museum.

Cole was appointed a CB for his work on the Great Exhibition and was knighted by Queen Victoria in 1875. Often referred to in the press as "Old King" Cole, he was known to have the closest personal backing of the Queen and especially of the Prince Consort, who when he needed a facilitator for one of his pet projects, was heard to remark: "We must have steam, get Cole".

Cole died in 1882 and is buried in a modest grave in Brompton Cemetery.

An English heritage blue plaque commemorates where Cole lived and worked at 33 Thurloe Square, South Kensington, London, opposite the Victoria and Albert Museum.

In 2001, one of Cole's first Christmas cards, which was sent to his grandmother in 1843, sold at auction for £22,500.
