= First Russell ministry =

Government of the United Kingdom from 1846 to 1852

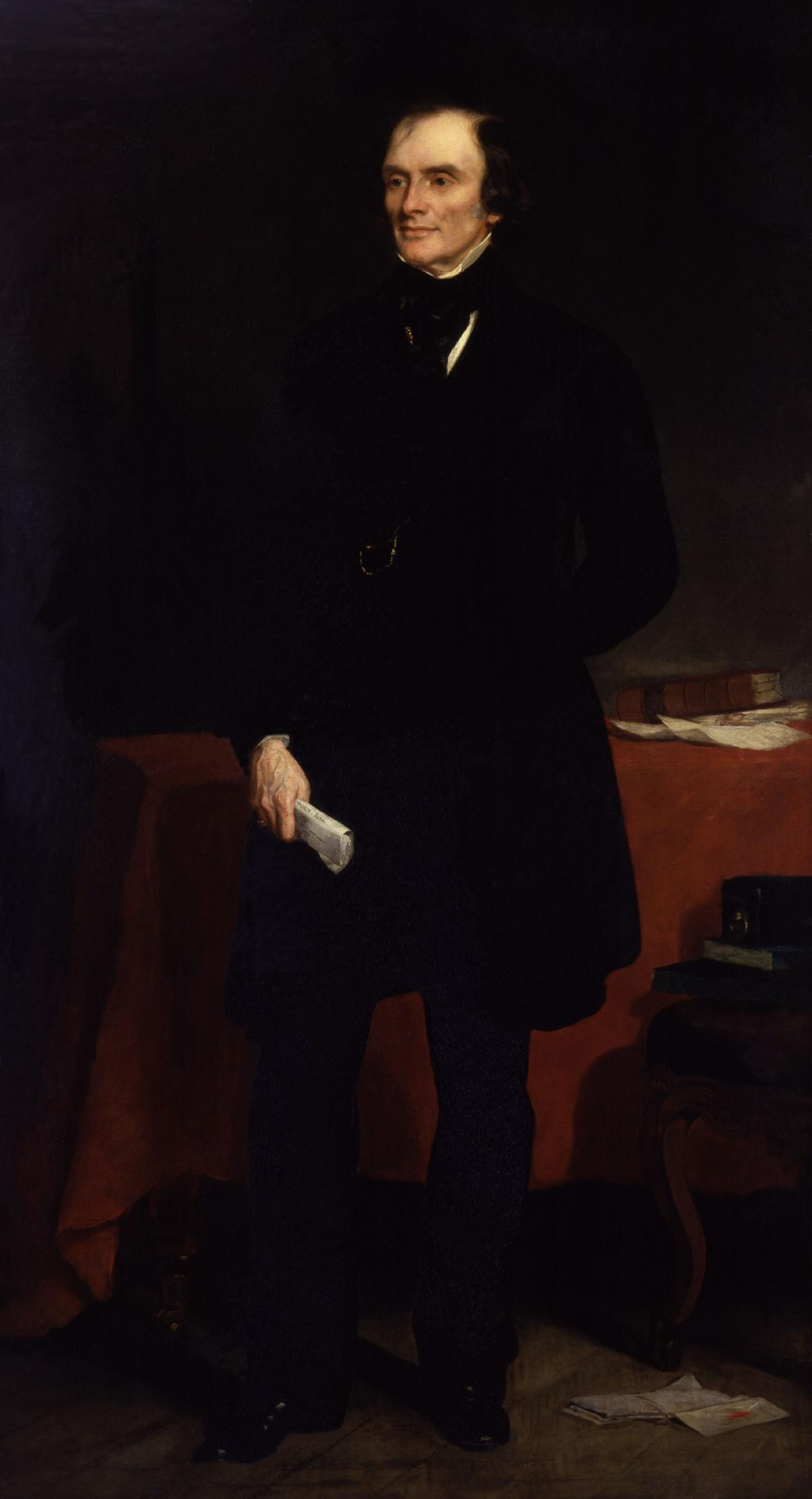
Portrait of Lord John Russell by Francis Grant, 1853

Whig Lord John Russell led the government of the United Kingdom of Great Britain and Ireland from 1846 to 1852.

== History ==
Following the split in the Tory Party over the Corn Laws in 1846 and the consequent end of Sir Robert Peel's second government, the Whigs came to power under Lord John Russell. Sir Charles Wood became Chancellor of the Exchequer, Sir George Grey Home Secretary and Lord Palmerston Foreign Secretary for the third time.

One of the major problems facing the government was the Great Irish Famine (1845–1849), which Russell failed to deal with effectively. Another problem was the maverick Foreign Secretary Lord Palmerston, who was eventually forced to resign in December 1851 after recognising the coup d'état of Louis Napoleon without first seeking royal approval. He was succeeded by Lord Granville, the first of his three tenures as Foreign Secretary. Palmerston thereafter successfully devoted his energies to bringing down Russell's government, leading to the formation of a minority Conservative government under Lord Derby in February 1852.

== Cabinet ==
=== July 1846 – February 1852 ===
Office	Name	Term
First Lord of the Treasury; Leader of the House of Commons	Lord John Russell	July 1846 – February 1852
Lord Chancellor	Charles Pepys, 1st Baron Cottenham	July 1846 – July 1850
	Thomas Wilde, 1st Baron Truro	July 1850 – February 1852
Lord President of the Council; Leader of the House of Lords	Henry Petty-FitzMaurice, 3rd Marquess of Lansdowne	July 1846 – February 1852
Lord Privy Seal	Gilbert Elliot-Murray-Kynynmound, 2nd Earl of Minto	July 1846 – February 1852
Home Secretary	Sir George Grey, 2nd Baronet	July 1846 – February 1852
Foreign Secretary	Henry Temple, 3rd Viscount Palmerston	July 1846 – December 1851
	Granville Leveson-Gower, 2nd Earl Granville	December 1851 – February 1852
Secretary of State for War and the Colonies	Henry Grey, 3rd Earl Grey	July 1846 – February 1852
Chancellor of the Exchequer	Sir Charles Wood	July 1846 – February 1852
First Lord of the Admiralty	George Eden, 1st Earl of Auckland	July 1846 – January 1849
	Sir Francis Baring	January 1849 – February 1852
President of the Board of Control	Sir John Cam Hobhouse, Bt	July 1846 – February 1852
	Fox Maule	February 1852
President of the Board of Trade	George Villiers, 4th Earl of Clarendon	July 1846 – July 1847
	Henry Labouchere	July 1847 – February 1852
Chancellor of the Duchy of Lancaster	John Campbell, 1st Baron Campbell of St Andrews	July 1846 – March 1850
	George Howard, 7th Earl of Carlisle	March 1850 – February 1852
First Commissioner of Woods and Forests	George Howard, Baron Morpeth†	July 1846 – July 1850
	Edward Seymour, Baron Seymour	July 1850 – February 1852
Chief Secretary for Ireland	Henry Labouchere	July 1846 – July 1847
	successor not in cabinet	
Postmaster General	Ulick John de Burgh, 1st Marquess of Clanricarde	July 1846 – February 1852
Paymaster General	Thomas Babington Macaulay	July 1846 – July 1847
	successor not in cabinet	
	Granville Leveson-Gower, 2nd Earl Granville	1851‡–December 1851
	successor not in cabinet	
Secretary at War	Fox Maule	1851‡–February 1852
	successor not in cabinet	

† became the Earl of Carlisle in 1848 ‡ denotes becoming a member of the cabinet, not gaining the office

==== Notes ====
- Lord Carlisle served as both Chancellor of the Duchy of Lancaster and First Commissioner of Woods and Forests between March and July 1850.

==== Changes ====
- July 1847: Henry Labouchere succeeds Lord Clarendon as President of the Board of Trade. Labouchere's successor as Chief Secretary for Ireland is not in the cabinet. Thomas Babington Macaulay leaves the cabinet. His successor as Paymaster-General is not in the Cabinet.
- January 1849: Sir Francis Baring succeeds Lord Auckland as First Lord of the Admiralty
- March 1850: Lord Carlisle succeeds Lord Campbell as Chancellor of the Duchy of Lancaster. He remains First Commissioner of Woods and Forests
- July 1850: Lord Truro succeeds Lord Cottenham as Lord Chancellor. Lord Seymour succeeds Lord Carlisle as First Commissioner of Woods and Forests. Lord Carlisle remains Chancellor of the Duchy of Lancaster.
- 1851: Fox Maule, the Secretary at War, and Lord Granville, the Paymaster-General, enter the Cabinet
- December 1851: Lord Granville succeeds Lord Palmerston as Foreign Secretary. Granville's successor as Paymaster-General is not in the Cabinet
- February 1852: Fox Maule succeeds Sir John Cam Hobhouse as President of the Board of Control. Maule's successor as Secretary at War is not in the Cabinet.

== List of ministers ==
Cabinet members are listed in bold face.

Office	Name	Date	Notes
Prime Minister, First Lord of the Treasury and Leader of the House of Commons	**Lord John Russell**	30 June 1846 – 21 February 1852	The Government resigned 22 February 1851 and resumed 3 March 1851
Chancellor of the Exchequer	**Sir Charles Wood, 3rd Baronet**	6 July 1846	
Parliamentary Secretary to the Treasury	Henry Tufnell	7 July 1846	
Parliamentary Secretary to the Treasury	William Goodenough Hayter	July 1850	
Financial Secretary to the Treasury	John Parker	7 July 1846	
Financial Secretary to the Treasury	William Goodenough Hayter	22 May 1849	
Financial Secretary to the Treasury	George Cornewall Lewis	9 July 1850	
Junior Lords of the Treasury	Hugh Fortescue, Viscount Ebrington	6 July 1846 – 22 December 1847	the number of Junior Lordships was reduced from four to three in 1848
Junior Lords of the Treasury	Denis O'Conor	6 July 1846 – 2 August 1847	the number of Junior Lordships was reduced from four to three in 1848
Junior Lords of the Treasury	William Gibson-Craig	6 July 1846 – 21 February 1852	the number of Junior Lordships was reduced from four to three in 1848
Junior Lords of the Treasury	Henry Rich	6 July 1846 – 21 February 1852	the number of Junior Lordships was reduced from four to three in 1848
Junior Lords of the Treasury	Richard Bellew	2 August 1847 – 21 February 1852	the number of Junior Lordships was reduced from four to three in 1848
Junior Lords of the Treasury	Henry Petty-FitzMaurice, Earl of Shelburne	22 December 1847 – August 1848	the number of Junior Lordships was reduced from four to three in 1848
Lord Chancellor	**Charles Pepys, 1st Baron Cottenham**	6 July 1846	
Lord Chancellor	in commission	19 June 1850	
Lord Chancellor	**Thomas Wilde, 1st Baron Truro**	15 July 1850	
Lord President of the Council and Leader of the House of Lords	**Henry Petty-FitzMaurice, 3rd Marquess of Lansdowne**	6 July 1846	
Lord Privy Seal	**Gilbert Elliot-Murray-Kynynmound, 2nd Earl of Minto**	6 July 1846	
Secretary of State for the Home Department	**Sir George Grey, 2nd Baronet**	6 July 1846	
Under-Secretary of State for the Home Department	Sir William Somerville, 5th Baronet	5 July 1846	
Under-Secretary of State for the Home Department	Sir Denis Le Marchant, 1st Baronet	22 July 1847	
Under-Secretary of State for the Home Department	George Cornewall Lewis	15 May 1848	
Under-Secretary of State for the Home Department	Edward Pleydell-Bouverie	9 July 1850	
Secretary of State for Foreign Affairs	**Henry John Temple, 3rd Viscount Palmerston**	6 July 1846	
Secretary of State for Foreign Affairs	**Granville Leveson-Gower, 2nd Earl Granville**	26 December 1851	
Under-Secretary of State for Foreign Affairs	Edward Stanley	6 July 1846	
Under-Secretary of State for Foreign Affairs	Austen Henry Layard	12 February 1852	
Secretary of State for War and the Colonies	**Henry Grey, 3rd Earl Grey**	6 July 1846	
Under-Secretary of State for War and the Colonies	Benjamin Hawes	6 July 1846	
Under-Secretary of State for War and the Colonies	Frederick Peel	1 November 1851	
President of the Board of Control	**Sir John Hobhouse, 2nd Baronet**	8 July 1846	
President of the Board of Control	**Fox Maule**	5 February 1852	
Joint Secretaries to the Board of Control	George Byng	6 July 1846 – 30 November 1847	
Joint Secretaries to the Board of Control	Thomas Wyse	6 July 1846 – 26 January 1849	
Joint Secretaries to the Board of Control	George Cornewall Lewis	30 November 1847 – 16 May 1848	
Joint Secretaries to the Board of Control	James Wilson	16 May 1848 – 21 February 1852	
Joint Secretaries to the Board of Control	John Elliot	26 January 1849 – 21 February 1852	
First Lord of the Admiralty	**George Eden, 1st Earl of Auckland**	7 July 1846	
First Lord of the Admiralty	**Sir Francis Baring, 3rd Baronet**	15 January 1849	
First Secretary of the Admiralty	Henry George Ward	13 July 1846	
First Secretary of the Admiralty	John Parker	21 May 1849	
Civil Lord of the Admiralty	William Cowper	7 July 1846	
Chief Secretary for Ireland	**Henry Labouchere**	6 July 1846	
Chief Secretary for Ireland	Sir William Somerville, 5th Baronet	22 July 1847	
Lord Lieutenant of Ireland	John Ponsonby, 4th Earl of Bessborough	8 July 1846	
Lord Lieutenant of Ireland	George Villiers, 4th Earl of Clarendon	22 May 1847	
Chancellor of the Duchy of Lancaster	**John Campbell, 1st Baron Campbell**	6 July 1846	
Chancellor of the Duchy of Lancaster	**George Howard, 7th Earl of Carlisle**	6 March 1850	
Paymaster General	**Thomas Babington Macaulay**	7 July 1846	
Paymaster General	**Granville Leveson-Gower, 2nd Earl Granville**	8 May 1848	entered the Cabinet October 1851
Paymaster General	Edward Stanley, 2nd Baron Stanley of Alderley	12 February 1852	
Postmaster-General	**Ulick de Burgh, 1st Marquess of Clanricarde**	7 July 1846	
President of the Board of Trade	**George Villiers, 4th Earl of Clarendon**	6 July 1846	
President of the Board of Trade	**Henry Labouchere**	22 July 1847	
Vice-President of the Board of Trade	Thomas Milner Gibson	8 July 1846	
Vice-President of the Board of Trade	Granville Leveson-Gower, 2nd Earl Granville	8 May 1848	
Vice-President of the Board of Trade	Edward Stanley, 2nd Baron Stanley of Alderley	11 February 1852	
First Commissioner of Woods and Forests	**George Howard, Viscount Morpeth**	7 July 1846	succeeded as 7th Earl of Carlisle 7 October 1848
First Commissioner of Woods and Forests	Edward Seymour, Baron Seymour	17 April 1849	office abolished 1 August 1851
First Commissioner of Works	**Edward Seymour, Baron Seymour**	1 August 1851	entered the Cabinet October 1851
Master-General of the Ordnance	Henry Paget, 1st Marquess of Anglesey	8 July 1846	
Surveyor-General of the Ordnance	Charles Richard Fox	8 July 1846	
Clerk of the Ordnance	George Anson	8 July 1846	
Storekeeper of the Ordnance	Sir Thomas Hastings	25 July 1845	continued in office
President of the Poor Law Board	Charles Buller	23 July 1847	
President of the Poor Law Board	Matthew Talbot Baines	1 January 1849	
Parliamentary Secretary to the Poor Law Board	Hugh Fortescue, Viscount Ebrington	23 July 1847	
Parliamentary Secretary to the Poor Law Board	Ralph William Grey	28 January 1851	
Secretary at War	Fox Maule	6 July 1846	
Secretary at War	Robert Vernon Smith	6 February 1852	
Attorney General	Sir Thomas Wilde	7 July 1846	
Attorney General	Sir John Jervis	17 July 1846	
Attorney General	Sir John Romilly	11 July 1850	
Attorney General	Sir Alexander Cockburn, 12th Baronet	28 March 1851	
Solicitor General	John Jervis	7 July 1846	
Solicitor General	Sir David Dundas	18 July 1846	
Solicitor General	Sir John Romilly	4 April 1848	
Solicitor General	Sir Alexander Cockburn, 12th Baronet	11 July 1850	
Solicitor General	Sir William Page Wood	28 March 1851	
Judge Advocate General	Charles Buller	8 July 1846	
Judge Advocate General	William Goodenough Hayter	22 December 1847	
Judge Advocate General	Sir David Dundas	26 May 1849	
Lord Advocate	Andrew Rutherfurd	6 July 1846	
Lord Advocate	James Moncreiff	7 April 1851	
Solicitor General for Scotland	Thomas Maitland	6 July 1846	
Solicitor General for Scotland	James Moncreiff	7 February 1850	
Solicitor General for Scotland	John Cowan	18 April 1851	
Solicitor General for Scotland	George Deas	28 June 1851	
Attorney General for Ireland	Richard Moore	16 July 1846	
Attorney General for Ireland	James Henry Monahan	21 December 1847	
Attorney General for Ireland	John Hatchell	23 September 1850	
Solicitor General for Ireland	James Henry Monahan	16 July 1846	
Solicitor General for Ireland	John Hatchell	24 December 1847	
Solicitor General for Ireland	Henry George Hughes	26 September 1850	
Lord Steward of the Household	Hugh Fortescue, 2nd Earl Fortescue	8 July 1846	
Lord Steward of the Household	Richard Grosvenor, 2nd Marquess of Westminster	22 March 1850	
Lord Chamberlain of the Household	Frederick Spencer, 4th Earl Spencer	8 July 1846	
Lord Chamberlain of the Household	John Campbell, 2nd Marquess of Breadalbane	5 September 1848	
Vice-Chamberlain of the Household	Lord Edward Howard	8 July 1846	
Master of the Horse	Henry Fitzalan-Howard, 13th Duke of Norfolk	11 July 1846	
Treasurer of the Household	Lord Robert Grosvenor	3 August 1846	
Treasurer of the Household	Lord Marcus Hill	23 July 1847	
Comptroller of the Household	Lord Marcus Hill	6 July 1846	
Comptroller of the Household	William Lascelles	23 July 1847	
Comptroller of the Household	George Phipps, 2nd Earl of Mulgrave	23 July 1851	
Captain of the Gentlemen-at-Arms	Thomas Foley, 4th Baron Foley	24 July 1846	
Captain of the Yeomen of the Guard	Lucius Cary, 10th Viscount Falkland	24 July 1846	
Captain of the Yeomen of the Guard	George Chichester, 3rd Marquess of Donegall	11 February 1848	
Master of the Buckhounds	Granville Leveson-Gower, 2nd Earl Granville	9 July 1846	
Master of the Buckhounds	John Ponsonby, 5th Earl of Bessborough	16 May 1848	
Chief Equerry and Clerk Marshal	Lord Alfred Paget	7 July 1846	
Mistress of the Robes	Harriet Sutherland-Leveson-Gower, Duchess of Sutherland	4 July 1846	
Lords in Waiting	Edmund Parker, 2nd Earl of Morley	24 July 1846 – 21 February 1852	
Lords in Waiting	Henry Reynolds-Moreton, 2nd Earl of Ducie	24 July 1846 – 1 December 1847	
Lords in Waiting	Henry Cavendish, 3rd Baron Waterpark	24 July 1846 – 21 February 1852	
Lords in Waiting	Thomas Stonor, 3rd Baron Camoys	4 August 1846 – 21 February 1852	
Lords in Waiting	George Douglas, 17th Earl of Morton	10 September 1841 – 26 June 1849	
Lords in Waiting	John Butler, 2nd Marquess of Ormonde	10 September 1841 – 21 February 1852	
Lords in Waiting	John Elphinstone, 13th Lord Elphinstone	1 December 1847 – 21 February 1852	
Lords in Waiting	Frederick Hamilton-Temple-Blackwood, 5th Baron Dufferin and Clandeboye	26 June 1849 – 21 February 1852	

Preceded by Second Peel ministry	Government of the United Kingdom; 1846–1852	Succeeded by Who? Who? ministry
