= A Meet of the Fife Hounds =

Painting by Francis Grant

A Meeting of the Fife Hounds
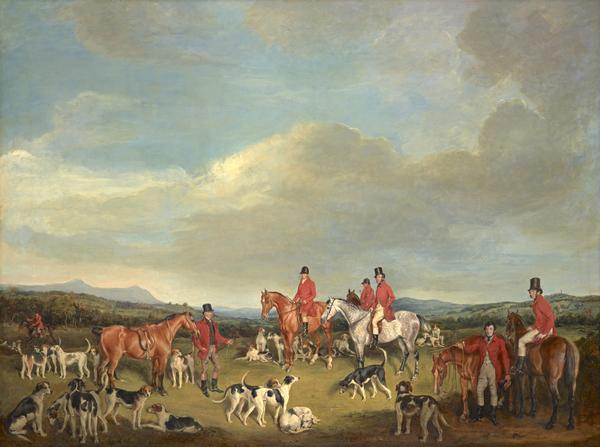
- Artist: Francis Grant
- Year: 1833
- Type: Oil on canvas
- Dimensions: 91.5 cm × 122 cm (36.0 in × 48 in)
- Location: Scottish National Portrait Gallery; Edinburgh

A Meet of the Fife Hounds is an oil painting on canvas by the British artist Francis Grant, from 1833. It is held at the Scottish National Portrait Gallery, in Edinburgh.

== History and description ==
Combining portrait painting with a traditional "sporting scene" it depicts foxhunters of the Fife Hounds in the field close to Falkland, with the Lomond Hills visible on the distance.

Grant came from a landed Scottish family, but having rapidly spent his inheritance, he turned to painting to make a living. This was one of two paintings commissioned by Anthony Keith-Falconer along with The Meet of the Buccleuch Hounds. They represented his first major hunting pictures. Stylistically both resemble the works of John Ferneley, a friend and mentor of Grant.

Despite building his reputation through hunting scenes, Grant later became best known for his fashionable portrait paintings and in 1866 he was elected as the President of the Royal Academy. The painting is today in the collection of the Scottish National Portrait Gallery in Edinburgh, having been accepted in lieu and allocated to the gallery in 2010.

== Bibliography ==
- Wills, Catherine. High Society: The Life and Art of Sir Francis Grant, 1803–1878. National Galleries of Scotland, 2003.
