= Self-Portrait (Grant) =

Painting by Francis Grant

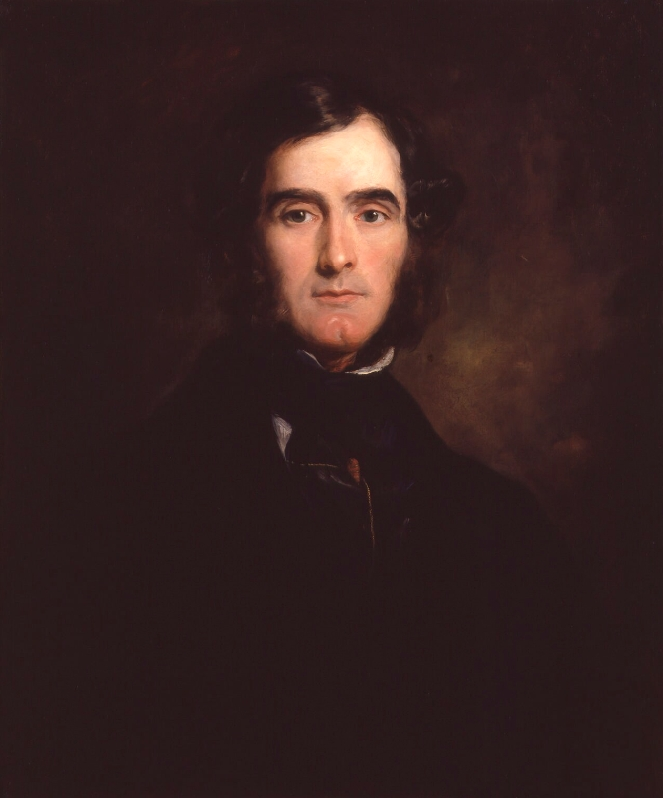
- Artist: Francis Grant
- Year: c. 1845
- Type: Oil on canvas, portrait painting
- Dimensions: 75.9 cm × 63.1 cm (29.9 in × 24.8 in)
- Location: National Portrait Gallery; London

Self-Portrait is an oil on canvas portrait painting by the British artist Francis Grant, from c. 1845.

A self-portrait, he is shown in the sober, but fashionable style of the period. Catherine Willis states: "It has a "Lawrence-like glamour, but the technique is closer to Grant's Scottish contemporary John Watson Gordon". Grant was a leading portrait painter of the early-to-mid Victorian era. In 1866 he succeeded Charles Lock Eastlake as President of the Royal Academy.

The work featured in the Royal Jubilee Exhibition in Manchester in 1887. The painting is in the collection of the National Portrait Gallery, in London, having been presented by Grant's daughter in 1901.

== Bibliography ==
- Ormond, Richard. Early Victorian Portraits, National Portrait Gallery, 1974.
- Wills, Catherine. High Society: The Life and Art of Sir Francis Grant, 1803–1878. National Galleries of Scotland, 2003.
