= Queen Victoria Riding Out =

Painting by Francis Grant

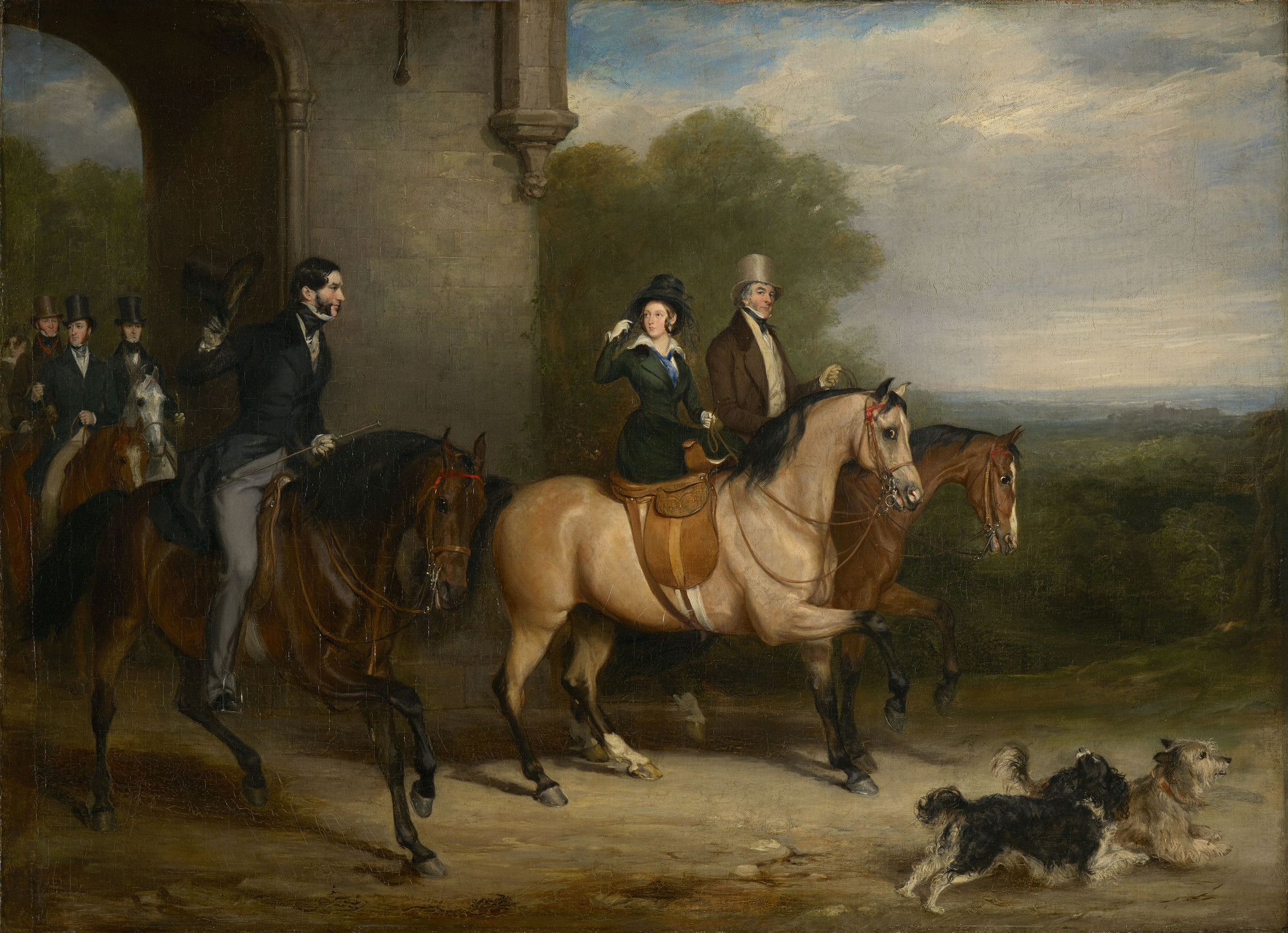
- Artist: Francis Grant
- Year: 1839–1840
- Type: Oil on canvas
- Dimensions: 99.1 cm × 137.2 cm (39.0 in × 54.0 in)
- Location: Royal Collection

Queen Victoria Riding Out is an 1840 painting by the British artist Francis Grant. It depicts Queen Victoria riding out on her horse Comus in Windsor Great Park. Next to her is the Prime Minister Lord Melbourne while her dogs Dash and Islay run out in front. Riding behind her is Lord Conyingham the Lord Chamberlain, who is raising his hat. Following through the Gothic archway on the left are George Byng, Lord Uxbridge and George Augustus Quentin. Windsor Castle can be seen in the distance.

Grant made his name through hunting and other sporting scenes, before turning to specialise in portrait painting. In 1866 he was elected President of the Royal Academy. The painting was commissioned by Victoria, likely at Melbourne's suggestion. Today it remains in the Royal Collection.

== Bibliography ==
- Clarke, Deborah & Remington, Vanessa. Scottish Artists 1750-1900: From Caledonia to the Continent. Royal Collection Trust, 2015.
- Plunkett, John. Queen Victoria: First Media Monarch. Oxford University Press, 2003.
- Wills, Catherine. High Society: The Life and Art of Sir Francis Grant, 1803-1878. National Galleries of Scotland, 2003.
