= Portrait of Sir James Brooke =

Painting by Francis Grant

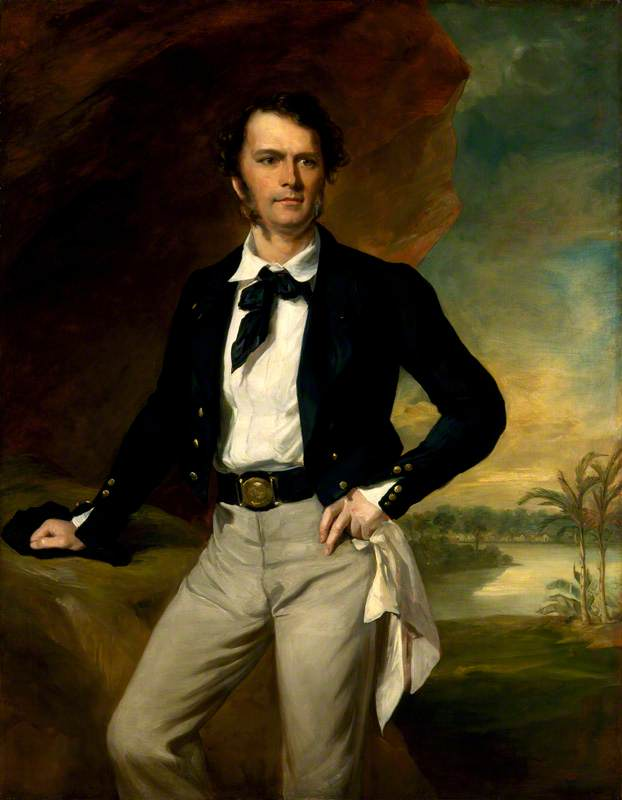
- Artist: Francis Grant
- Year: 1847
- Type: Oil on canvas, portrait painting
- Dimensions: 142.9 cm × 111.1 cm (56.3 in × 43.7 in)
- Location: National Portrait Gallery; London

Portrait of Sir James Brooke is an 1847 portrait painting by the British artist Francis Grant. It depicts the British soldier and adventurer Sir James Brooke, who in 1841 became the Rajah of Sarawak in Borneo. He had subsequently spearheaded anti-piracy operations. Brooke is shown in undress naval uniform against a romanticised background likely intended to represent Sawarak. It was painted shortly after Brooke's return to England. Grant, whose nephew Charles Grant was one Brooke's aides, gave the sitter the painting as a gift. The work was the basis of an engraving made by William Holl the following year. Today the painting is in the collection of the National Portrait Gallery, having been bequeathed by Spenser St. John in 1910. Grant was a leading portraitist of the mid-Victorian era and later served as President of the Royal Academy. "The painting's spontaneity, directness and lack of pretension make it one of Grant's masterpieces".

== Bibliography ==
- Herrmann, Luke. Nineteenth Century British Painting. Charles de la Mare, 2000.
- Wills, Catherine. High Society: The Life and Art of Sir Francis Grant, 1803–1878. National Galleries of Scotland, 2003.
