= Portrait of Daisy Grant =

Painting by Francis Grant

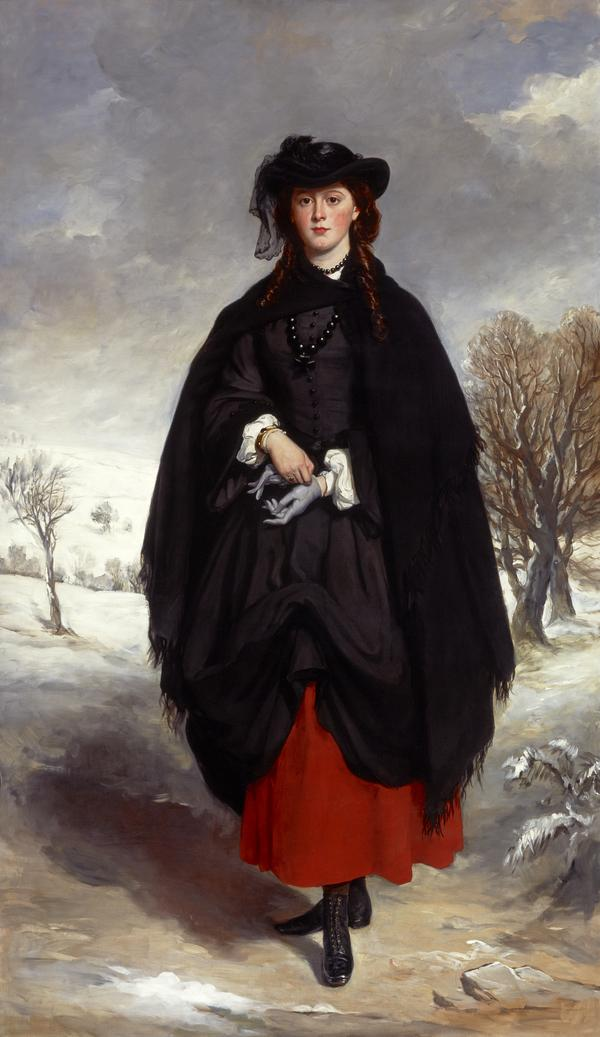
- Artist: Francis Grant
- Year: 1857
- Type: Oil on canvas, portrait painting
- Dimensions: 223.5 cm × 132.3 cm (88.0 in × 52.1 in)
- Location: Scottish National Gallery, Edinburgh

Portrait of Daisy Grant is an oil on canvas portrait painting by the British artist Francis Grant, from 1857. It is held at the Scottish National Gallery, in Edinburgh.

== History and description ==
It depicts the painter's daughter Anne Grant, always known as Daisy to the family. She is depicted against a snow-covered background. It is also known by the alternative title Mrs. Markham in reference to the sitters married name.

The painting was praised by fellow artist Richard Redgrave who observed "one of his portraits of most marked excellence is his daughter". The work was displayed at the Royal Academy Exhibition of 1857 at the National Gallery in London. Today it is in the collection of the Scottish National Gallery having been acquired in 2005.

== Bibliography ==
- Wills, Catherine. High Society: The Life and Art of Sir Francis Grant, 1803–1878. National Galleries of Scotland, 2003.
