= Ferdinand Hope-Grant =

English cricketer and clergyman

Ferdinand Cecil Hope-Grant (10 December 1839 – 7 May 1875) was an English clergyman and cricketer who played first-class cricket for Cambridge University and the Marylebone Cricket Club. He was born at St Pancras, London, and died at Paddington, also in London.

Hope-Grant played as a lower-order batsman in two matches for Cambridge University in 1861 and 1863, the second of which was the annual University match against Oxford University. He also played for MCC in 1862 and 1863. Full statistics are not available for all of his games, but he certainly bowled in one match, taking two wickets, though neither his bowling nor his batting style is known.

== Family, name and career ==
Hope-Grant was the son of the portrait painter and president of the Royal Academy Sir Francis Grant; his uncle was the general James Hope Grant, and for a time, including his cricket career and his Cambridge University graduation, Ferdinand adopted the name "Hope-Grant", while at other times "Hope" was one of three forenames.

Hope-Grant was educated at Harrow School and Trinity College, Cambridge. On graduation from Cambridge, he was ordained as a Church of England priest. He was vicar of Kimbolton, then in Huntingdonshire, now in Cambridgeshire, from 1868 to his death, and also acted as a chaplain to the Prince of Wales.
