= Portrait of Lord John Russell =

Painting by Francis Grant

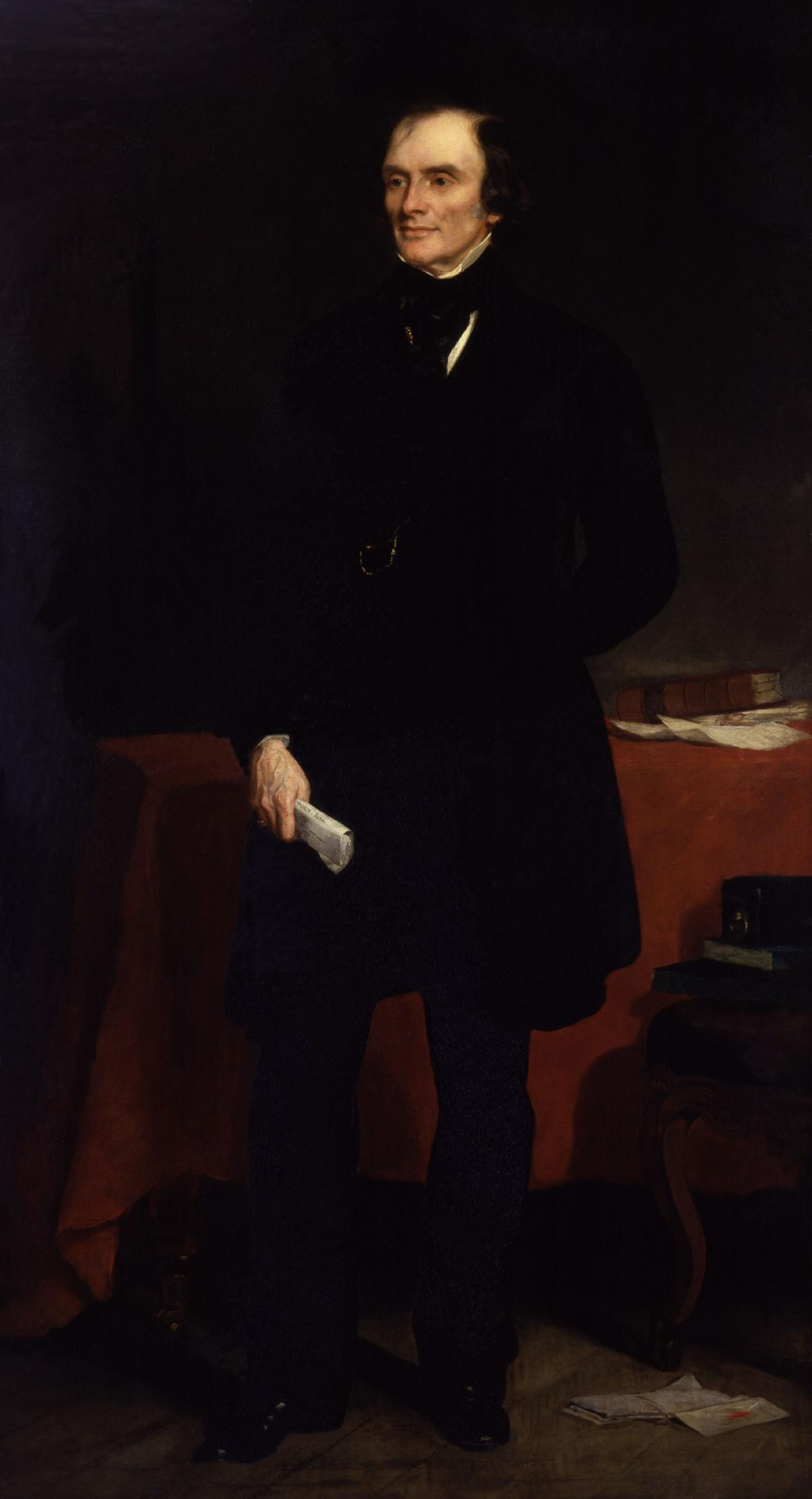
- Artist: Francis Grant
- Year: 1853
- Type: Oil on canvas, portrait painting
- Dimensions: 201.3 cm × 111.8 cm (79.3 in × 44.0 in)
- Location: National Portrait Gallery, London

Portrait of Lord John Russell is an 1853 portrait painting by the British artist Francis Grant. It depicts the politician Lord John Russell, a Whig who twice served as Prime Minister from 1846 to 1852 and 1865 to 1866.

The painting was exhibited at the Royal Academy Exhibition of 1854 at the National Gallery. It was displayed at the Salon of 1855 in Paris, part of the Exposition Universelle, one of four paintings that Grant submitted. It also featured at the Manchester Art Treasures Exhibition in 1857. Today it is in the collection of the National Portrait Gallery in London, having been given by the Duke of Bedford in 1898.

== Bibliography ==
- Ormond, Richard. Early Victorian Portraits, National Portrait Gallery, 1974.
- Pergam, Elizabeth A. The Manchester Art Treasures Exhibition of 1857. Routledge, 2017.
- Wills, Catherine. High Society: The Life and Art of Sir Francis Grant, 1803–1878. National Galleries of Scotland, 2003.
