= John Cowan, Lord Cowan =

Scottish judge

John Cowan, Lord Cowan (1798–1878) was a Scottish judge who rose to be a Senator of the College of Justice.

== Life ==
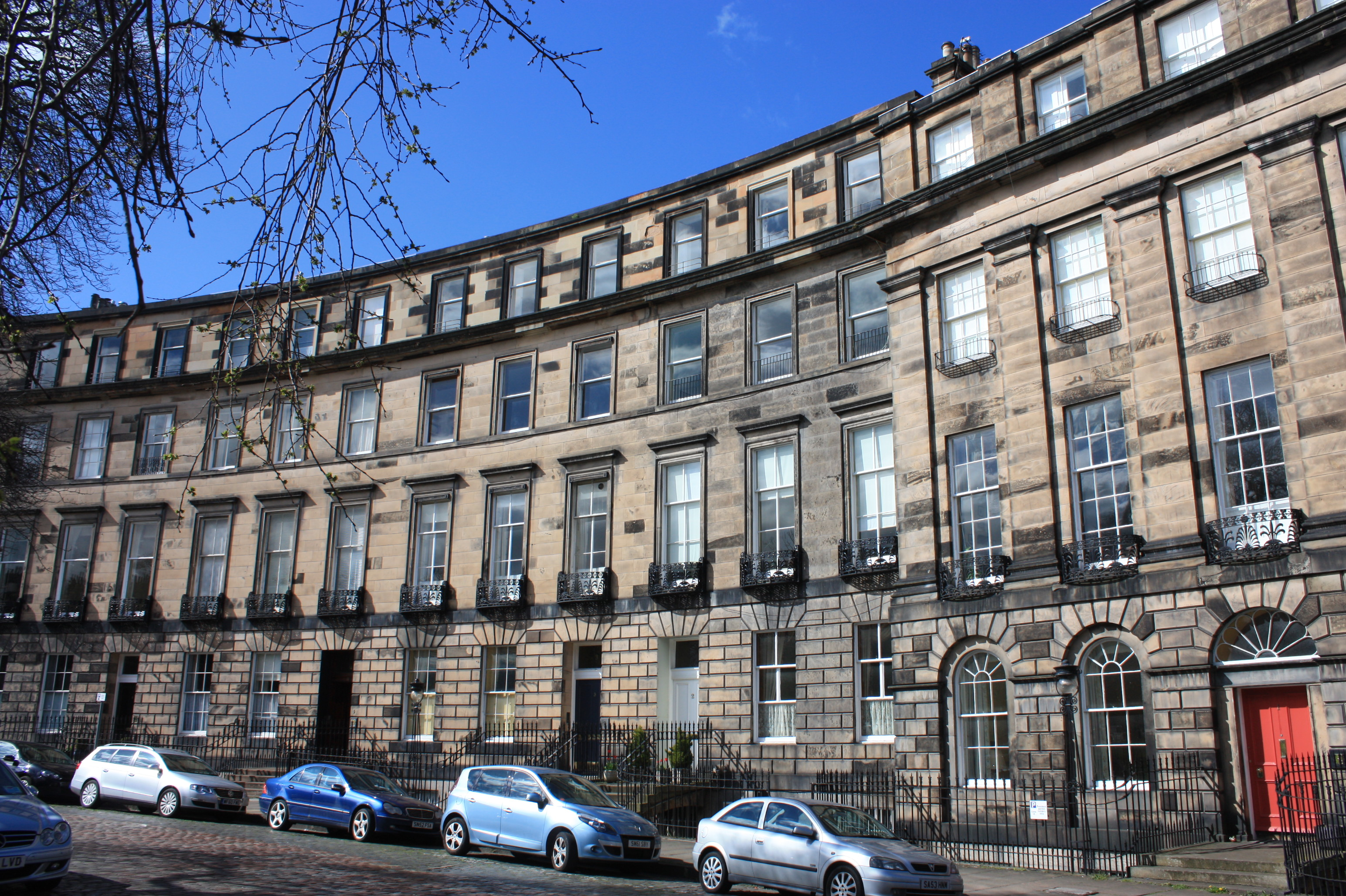
Lord Cowan's home at Ainslie Place, Edinburgh

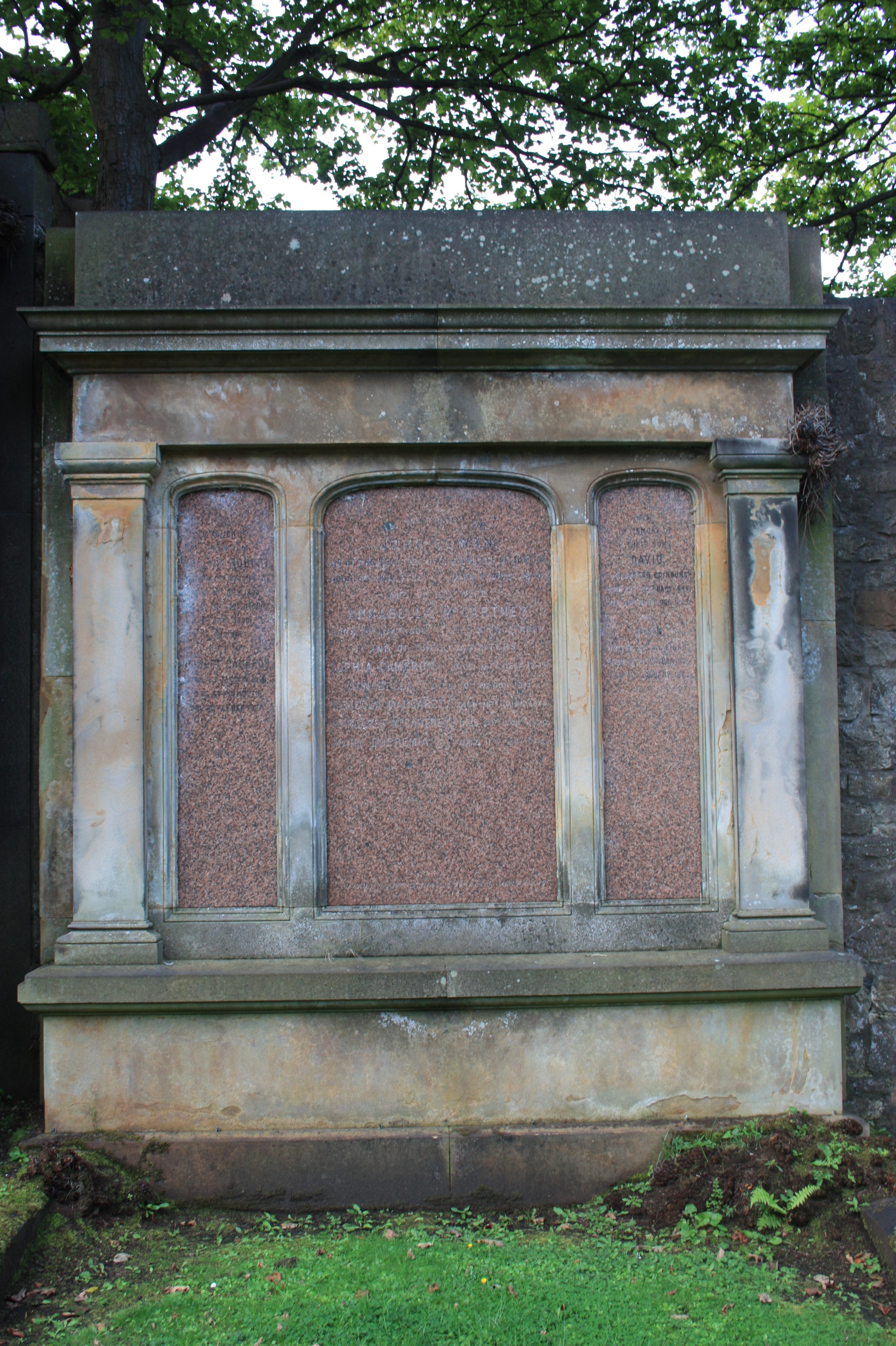
The grave of John Cowan, Lord Cowan, Dean Cemetery, Edinburgh

He was born on 6 July 1798. He was the son of Hugh Cowan and Sophia Cameron.

He qualified as an advocate in 1822.

In 1830 he is operating as an advocate from 30 Drummond Place (possibly his father's office) and from 1840 at 2 North Charlotte Street off Charlotte Square in Edinburgh.

He was created a Senator in 1851. At this stage he lived at 4 Ainslie Place on the prestigious Moray Estate in western Edinburgh.

In later life he lived at Elmbank on Whitehouse Loan in south Edinburgh.

He died in Edinburgh on 1 August 1878 aged 80. He is buried with his family in "Lords Row" on the western wall of Dean Cemetery.

== Family ==
He was married to Annabella McCartney (1806–1858). They had five daughters (Annabella, Sophia, Margaret, Rebecca, and Mary) and five sons (Hugh, William, John, Robert, and David).

== Artistic recognition ==
His early calotype photograph (around 1845) by the pioneer photographers Hill & Adamson is held by the Scottish National Portrait Gallery.
