= Francis Grant (artist) =

British painter (1803–1878)

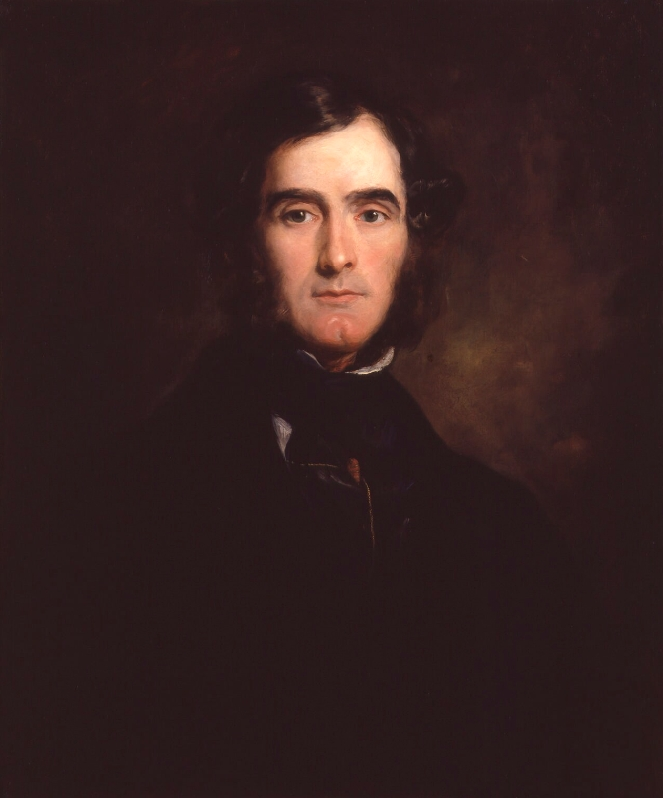
- Self-Portrait, c. 1845. National Portrait Gallery, London.
- Born: 18 January 1803; Kilgraston, Perthshire, Scotland
- Died: 5 October 1878 (aged 75); Melton Mowbray, Leicestershire, England
- Occupation: Painter

Sir Francis Grant PRA (18 January 1803 – 5 October 1878) was a Scottish portrait painter who painted Queen Victoria and many British aristocratic and political figures. He served as President of the Royal Academy.

== Life ==
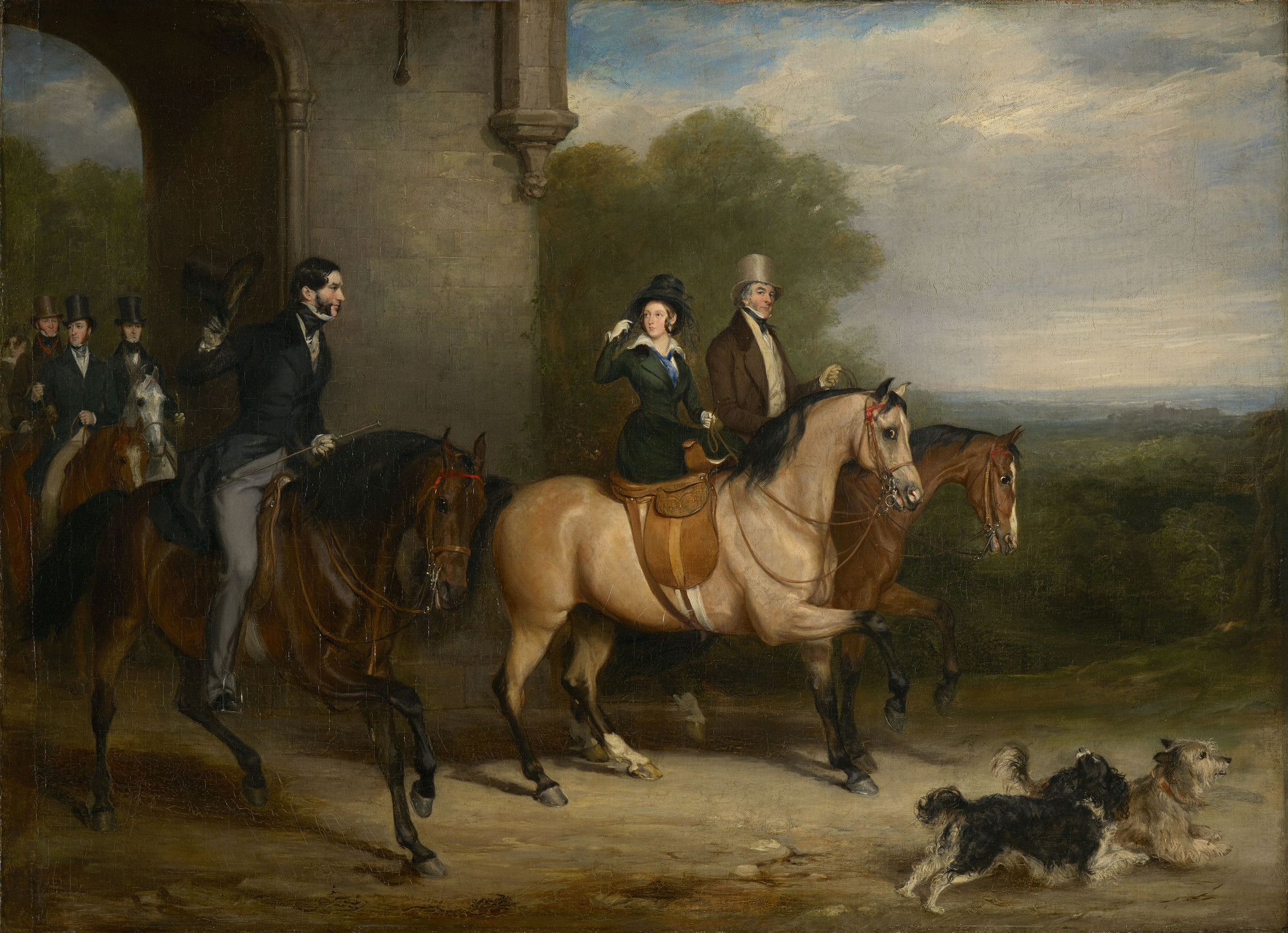
Queen Victoria Riding Out, 1840

Grant was the fourth son of Francis Grant, Laird of Kilgraston, near Bridge of Earn, Perthshire, and his wife Anne Oliphant of Rossie. Grant was educated at Harrow School and Edinburgh High School. His father, a plantation owner in Jamaica, died in 1818, leaving money to his seven children.

Initially Grant intended to become a lawyer, but he left his studies after a year, and took up painting. He possibly spent time in the Edinburgh studio of Alexander Nasmyth.

Grant through his second wife gained access to a clientele in the hunting set at Melton Mowbray, where he hunted himself, and took lessons with the artist John Ferneley. He acquired a reputation as a painter of sporting subjects, and in 1834 exhibited at the Royal Academy a picture called Melton Breakfast which was engraved by Charles George Lewis. In 1840 he exhibited an equestrian group of Queen Victoria riding with Lord Melbourne and others in Windsor Park, and became the fashionable portrait-painter of the day. His portrait of Lady Glenlyon, exhibited in 1842, increased his reputation, and for nearly 40 years graceful portraits in the Royal Academy exhibitions came from his studio.

Elected an associate of the Royal Academy in 1842, Grant in 1851 became an academician. In 1866, on the death of Charles Eastlake, Edwin Landseer turned down the seat of Academy president, and Grant was elected instead. He was knighted that year.

== Works ==
In March 1831 on a visit to Abbotsford House, Grant painted a cabinet painting of Sir Walter Scott (now held by the National Galleries of Scotland accession number PG 103) for Scotts's friend Lady Ruthven. It depicts Scott at his desk, armour on the wall and his two noble staghounds Nimrod and Bran. Scott writing in his diary of Grant said "Frank will, I believe, if he attends to his profession, be one of the celebrated men of the age" In 1837 Grant exhibited at the Royal Academy The Meeting of His Majesty's Staghounds on Ascot Heath, painted for George Stanhope, 6th Earl of Chesterfield, and in 1839 The Melton Hunt, purchased by the Duke of Wellington (both of these were engraved, the former by Frederick Bromley, the latter by William Humphrys). In 1841, he painted A Shooting Party at Rawton Abbey for Thomas Anson, 1st Earl of Lichfield, and in 1848 The Cottesmore Hunt for Sir Richard Sutton, 2nd Baronet.

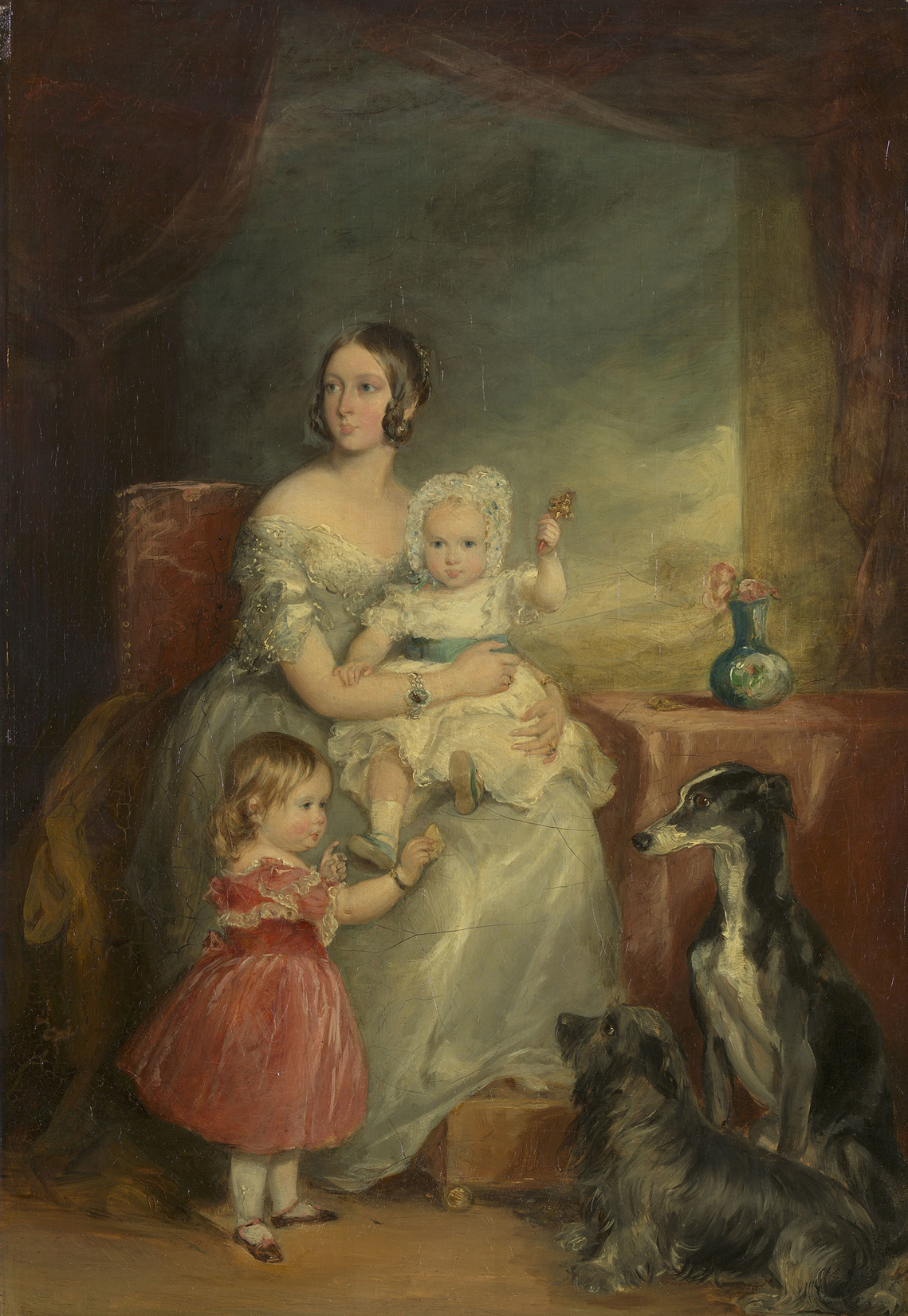
Queen Victoria with the Princess Royal and Prince of Wales, 1842

Between 1834 and 1879 Grant contributed 253 works, many of which were full-length portraits, to the exhibitions of the Royal Academy. Among those were equestrian portraits of Queen Victoria and Albert, Prince Consort, painted for Christ's Hospital; the Prince of Wales; an equestrian group of the Duke and Duchess of Beaufort; Sidney Herbert; Lord John Russell; Benjamin Disraeli; John Hick and Mrs Hick; General Sir James Hope Grant; Sir George Grey, 2nd Baronet; Edward Smith-Stanley, 14th Earl of Derby, prime minister; Lord Clyde; Viscount Palmerston, painted for Harrow School; Viscount Gough; Lord Truro, lord high chancellor; Sir Frederick Pollock, 1st Baronet, Chief Baron of the Exchequer; Sir William Erle, lord chief justice of the common pleas; John Sumner, archbishop of Canterbury; George Moberly, bishop of Salisbury; and John Gibson Lockhart.

His noted female portraits included those of Louisa Beresford, Marchioness of Waterford, exhibited in 1844, of Elizabeth Upton, Marchioness of Bristol, and of Mrs Markham (his daughter Daisy Grant – see below), exhibited in 1857.

== Last years and death ==
After some years of gradually failing health, Grant died of heart disease suddenly at his residence, The Lodge, Melton Mowbray, on 5 October 1878, and was interred in the Anglican cemetery, his relations having declined the usual honour of burial in St Paul's Cathedral. His funeral was conducted by the Archbishop of York, William Thomson on 12 October and many of the leading British artists attended, including Edward John Poynter, Edward Armitage, Thomas Woolner, Philip Hermogenes Calderon, and the American Albert Bierstadt.

== Family ==
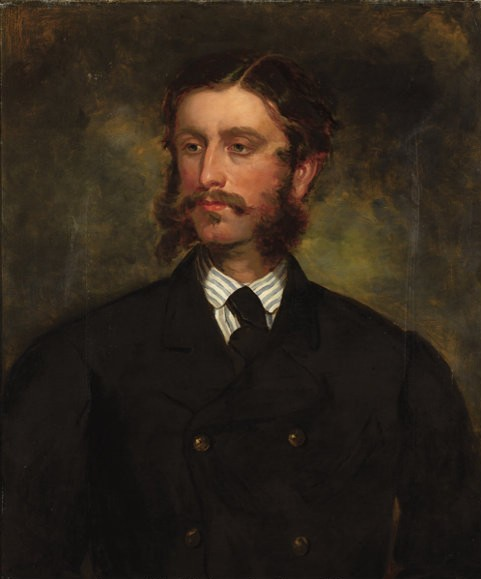
William Thomas Markham, husband of Daisy Grant, portrait by Francis Grant

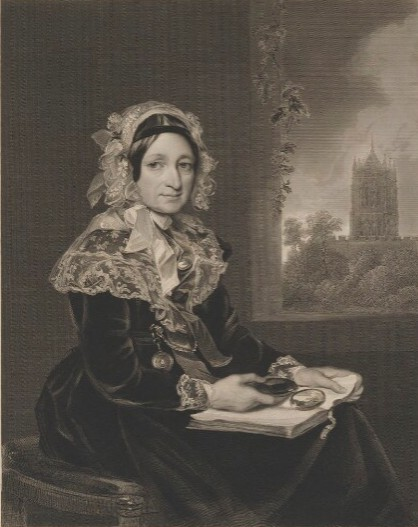
Engraving of Lady Elizabeth Isabella Norman, mother of his second wife, after a portrait by Francis Grant

Grant married, firstly, Amelia Farquharson (died 1827), the daughter of a Scottish laird, in 1826; she died after giving birth to their son. He married again, in 1829, Isabella Elizabeth Norman, daughter of Richard Norman and his wife Lady Elizabeth Isabella, and a niece of John Manners, 5th Duke of Rutland; they had three sons and four daughters. The sons were John (b.1827), Francis (b.1834), and Ferdinand Hope-Grant, a chaplain to the Prince of Wales.. One of the daughters was Anne Emily Sophia Grant (also known as Daisy Grant or Mrs. Colonel William Thomas Markham), whose portrait, by her father, hangs in the National Gallery of Scotland, and has been noted for its depiction of Victorian womanhood.

Grant was the brother of General Sir James Hope Grant. Mary Grant, the eminent Victorian sculptor, was his niece.

== Gallery ==
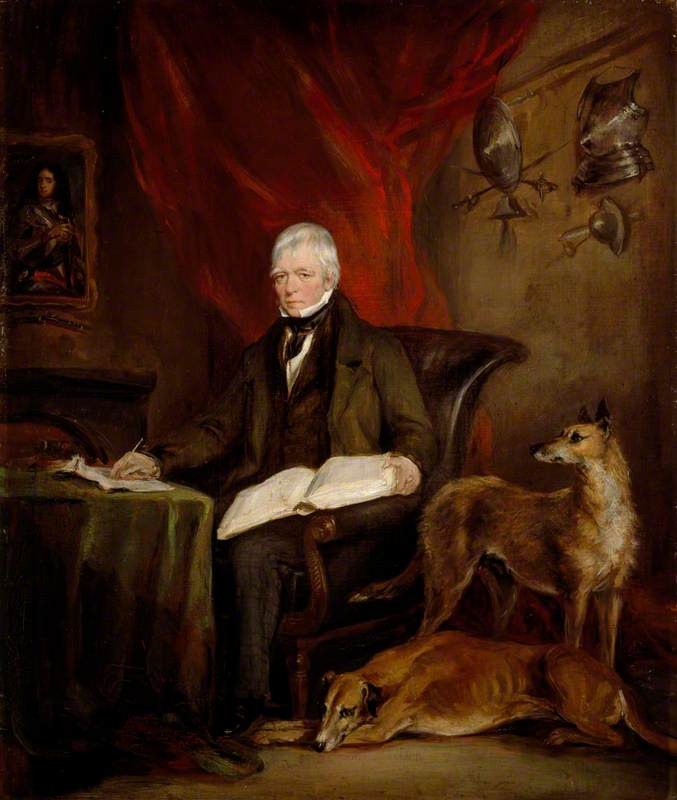
Sir Walter Scott, 1831

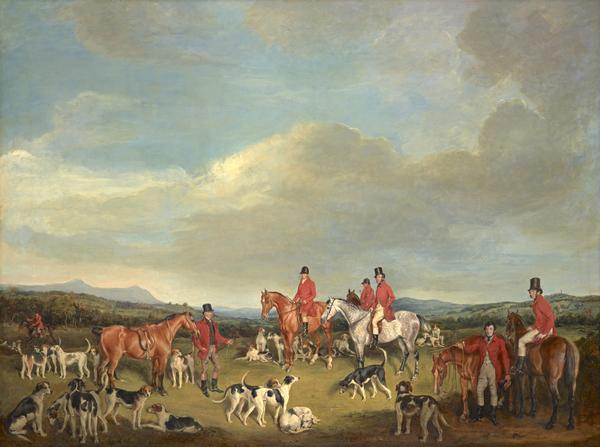
A Meet of the Fife Hounds, 1833

The Melton Hunt Breakfast, 1834

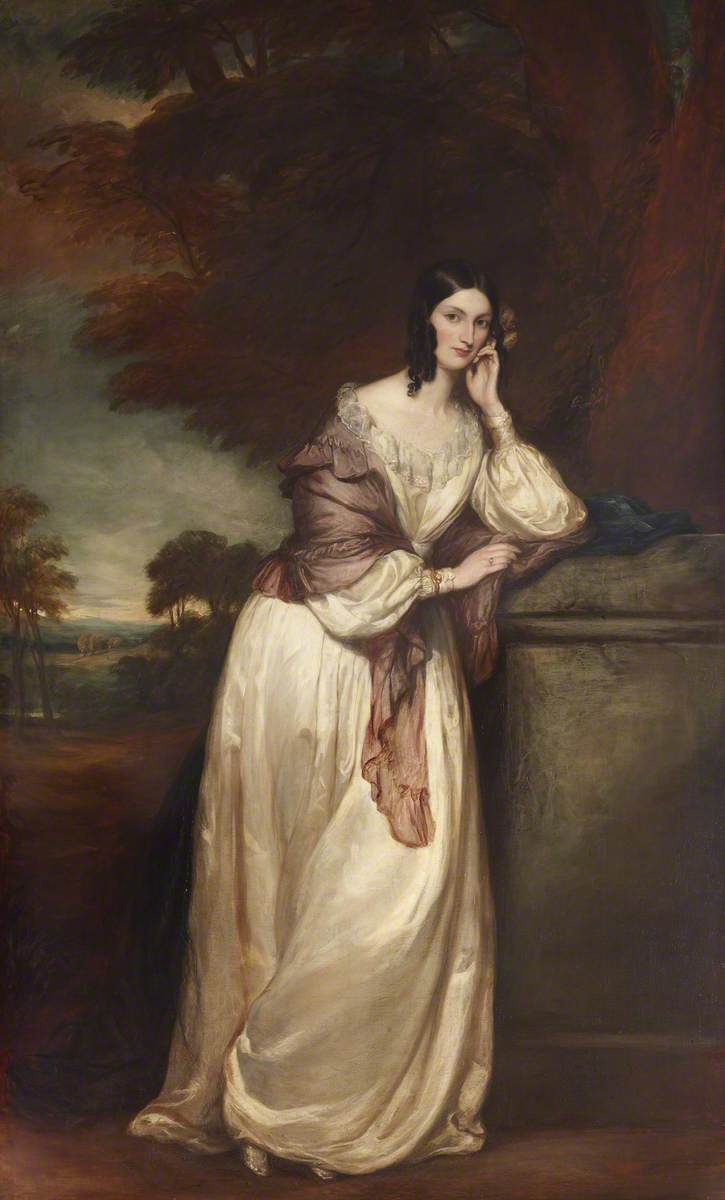
Portrait of Countess Jermyn, 1839

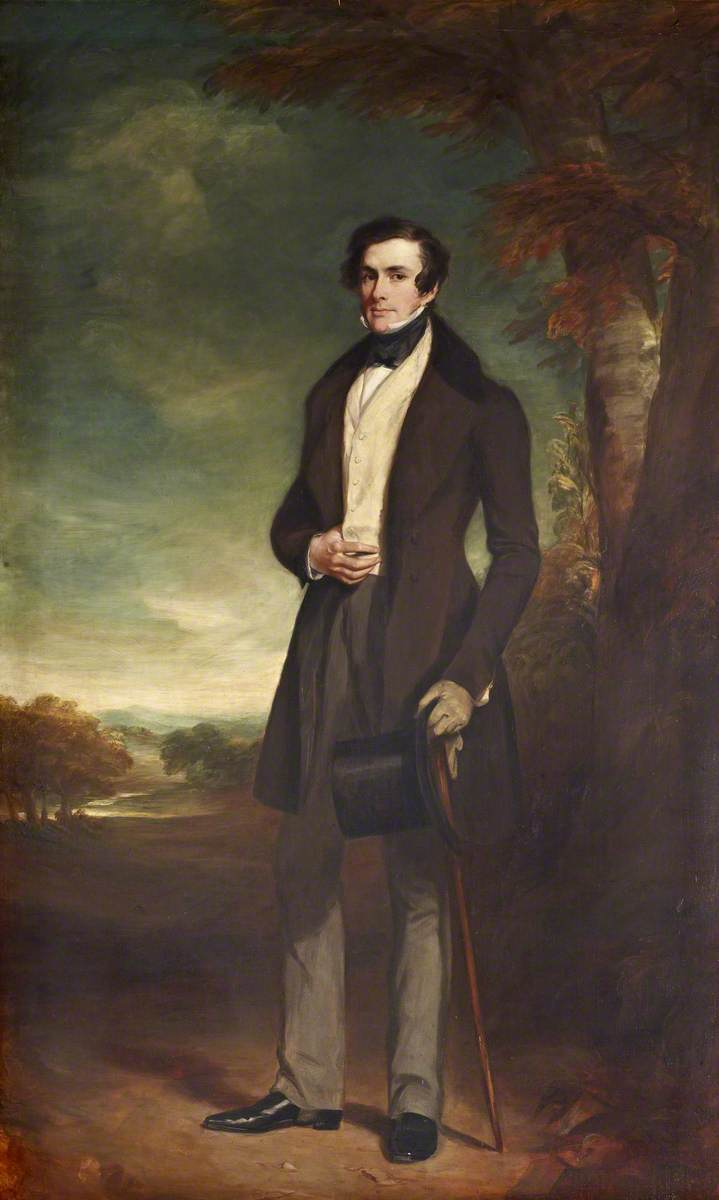
Marquess of Bristol, 1839

The Melton Hunt Going to Draw the Ram's Head Cover, 1839

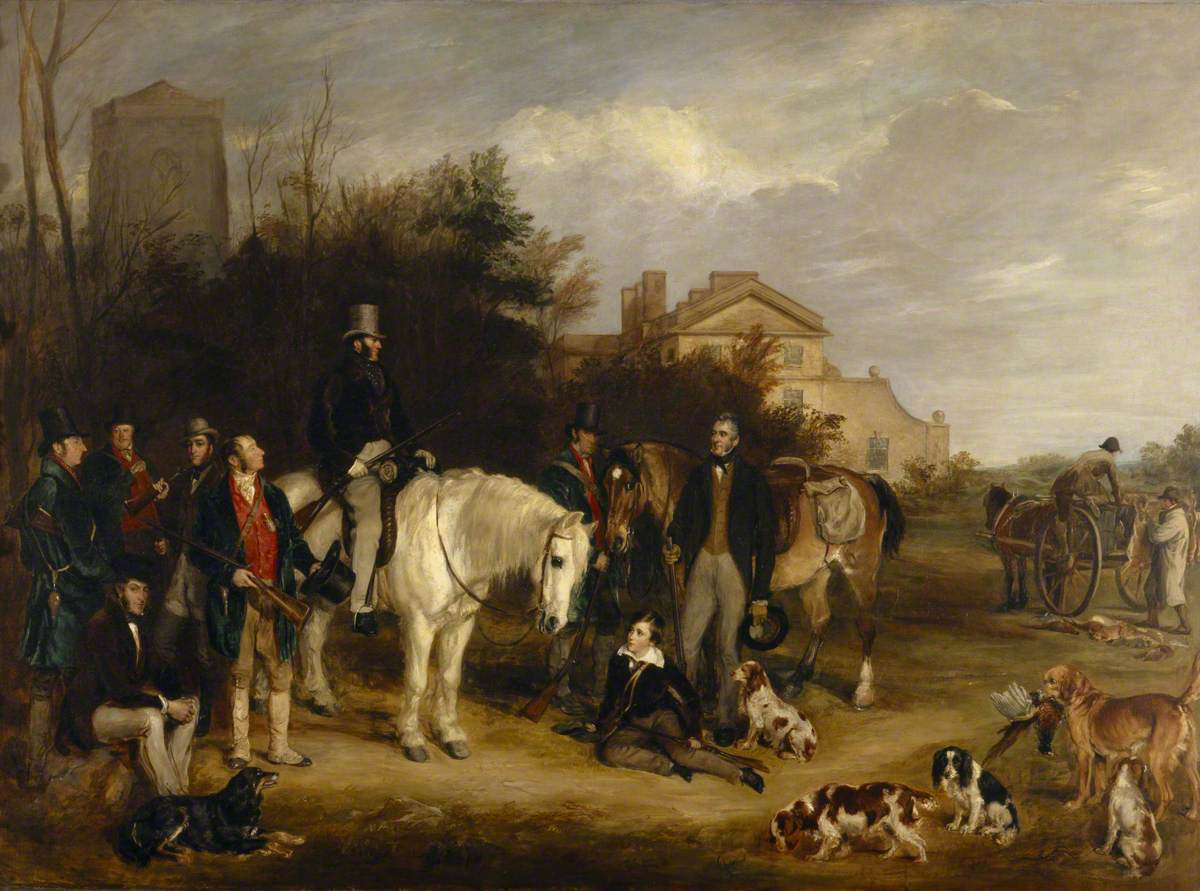
A Shooting Party at Ranton Abbey, 1839

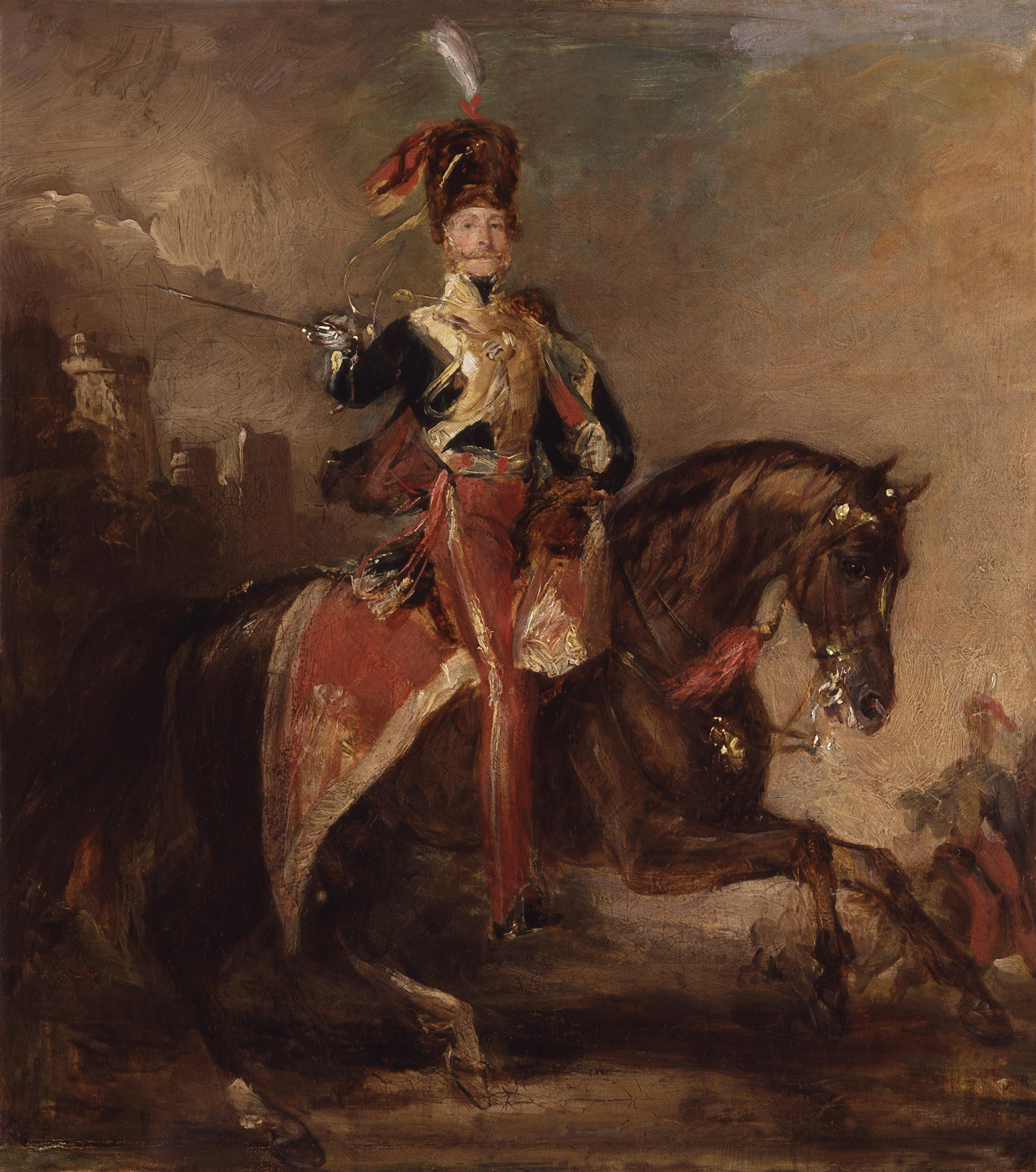
Earl of Cardigan, c.1841

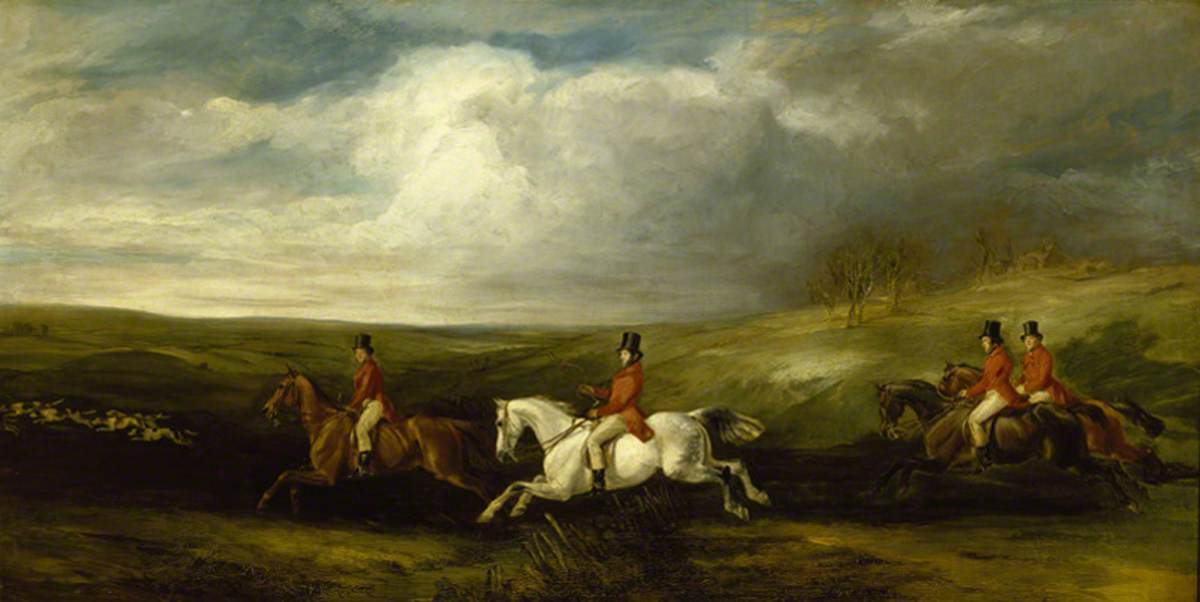
Full Cry, 1841

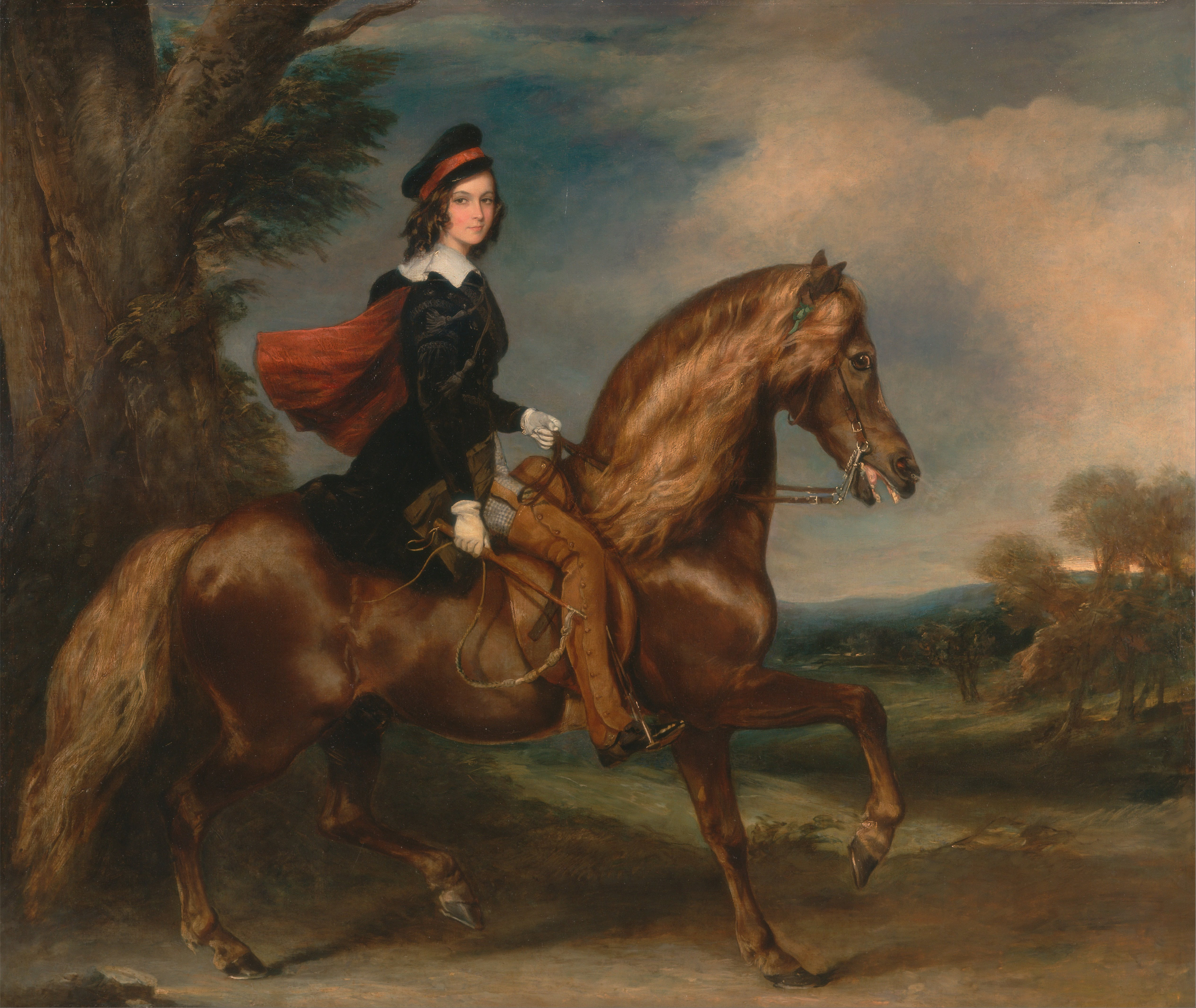
James Keith Fraser on His Pony, 1844

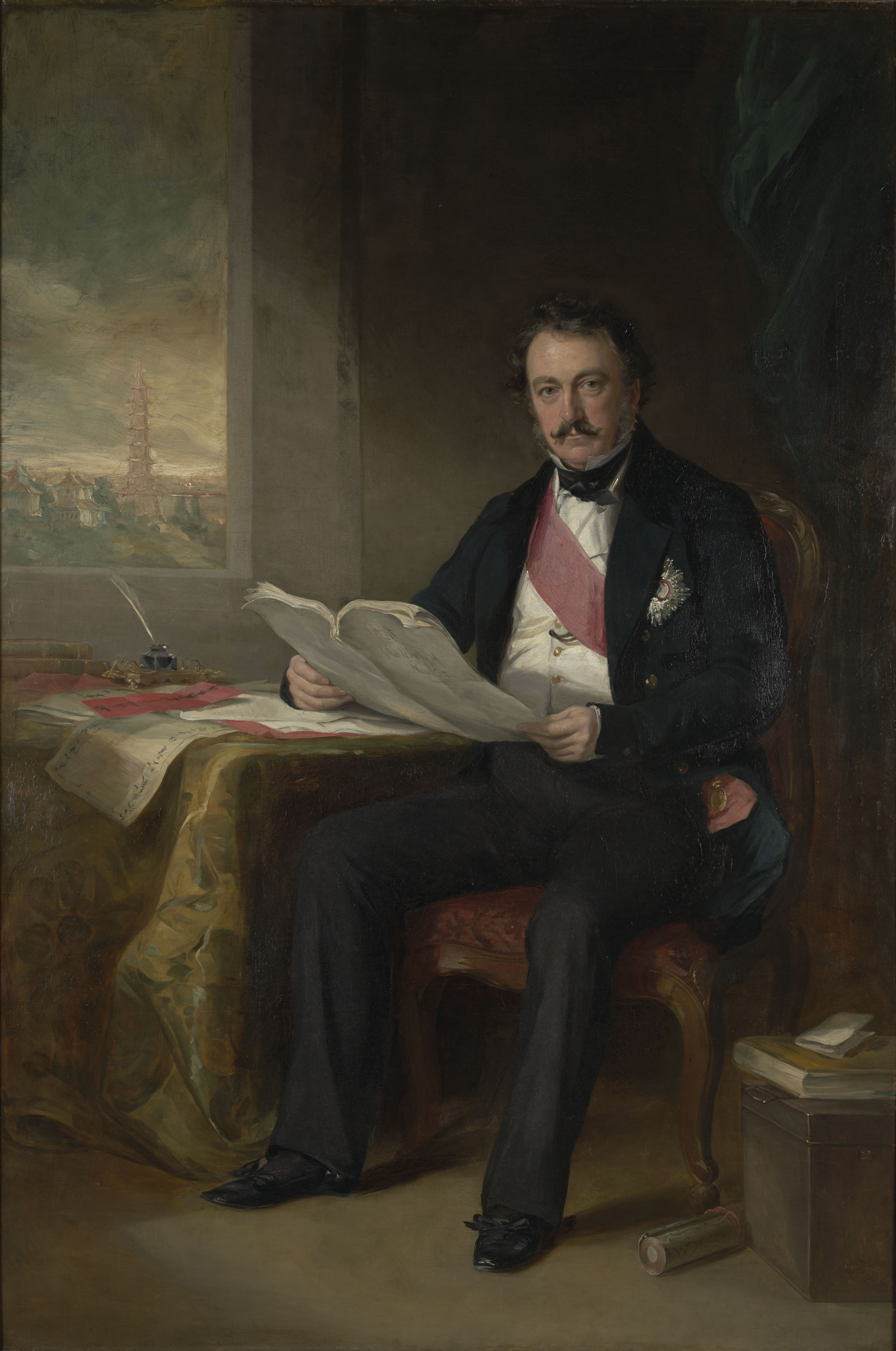
Henry Pottinger, 1845

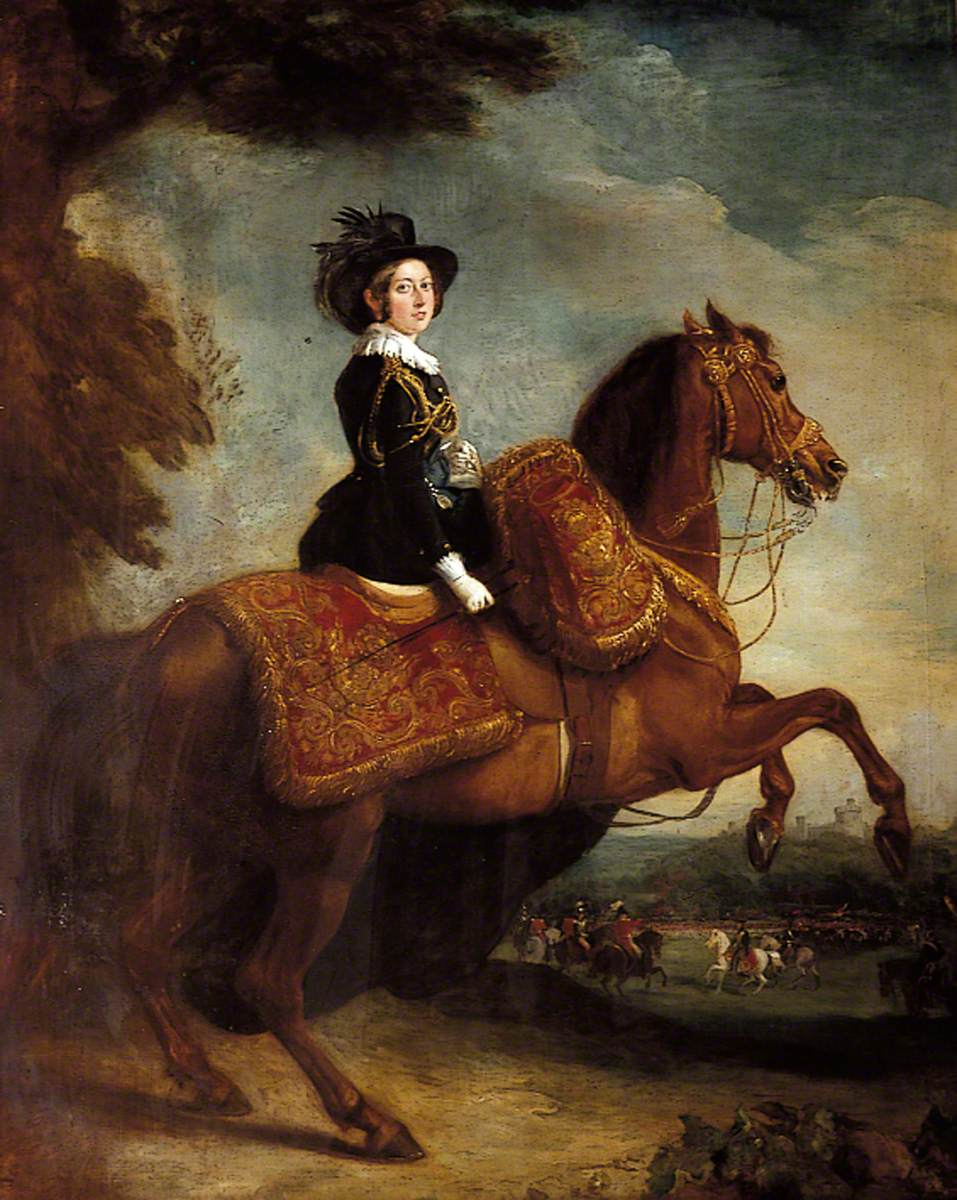
Queen Victoria, 1845

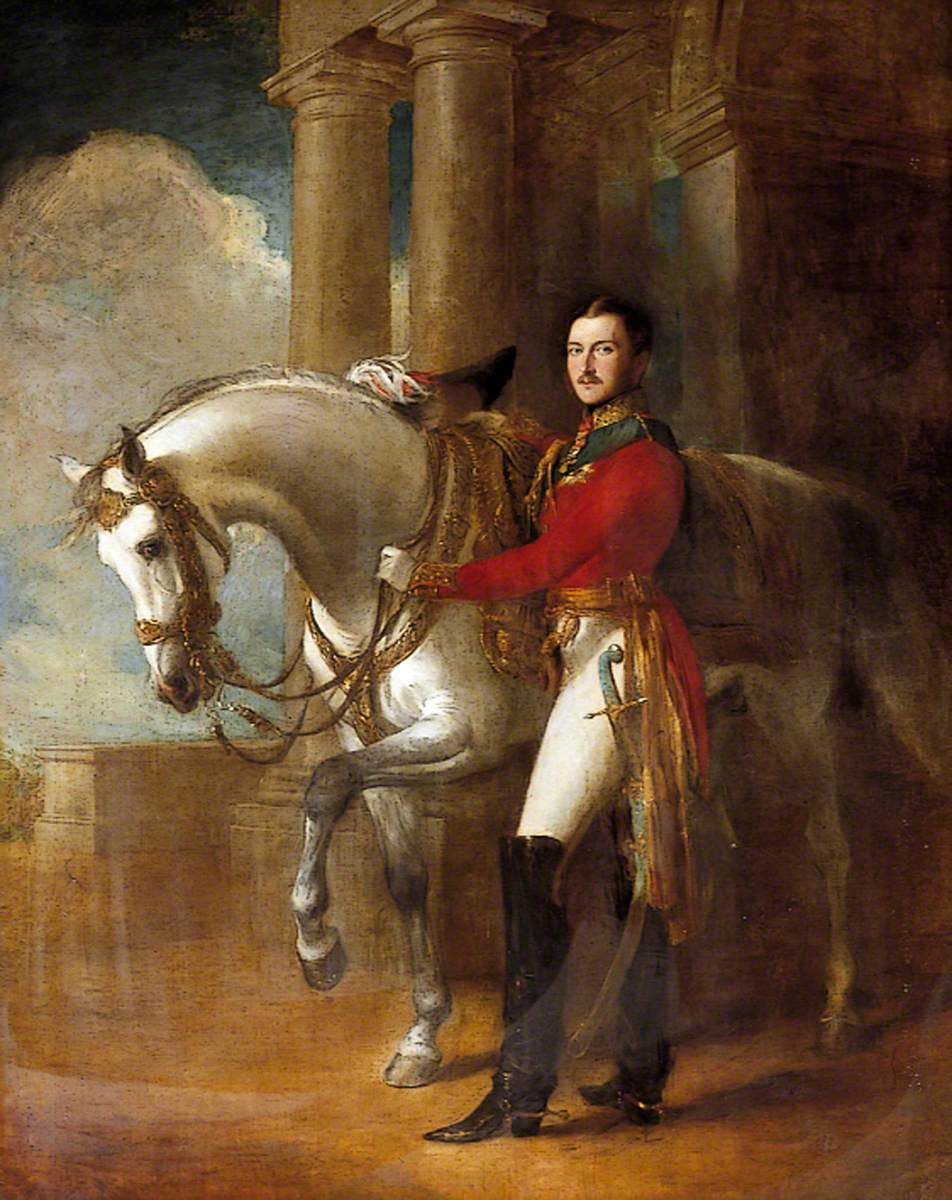
Prince Albert, 1846

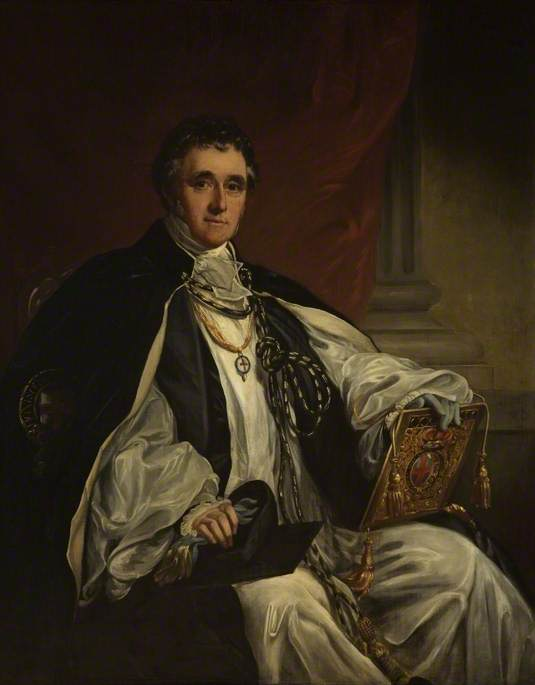
Richard Bagot, 1846

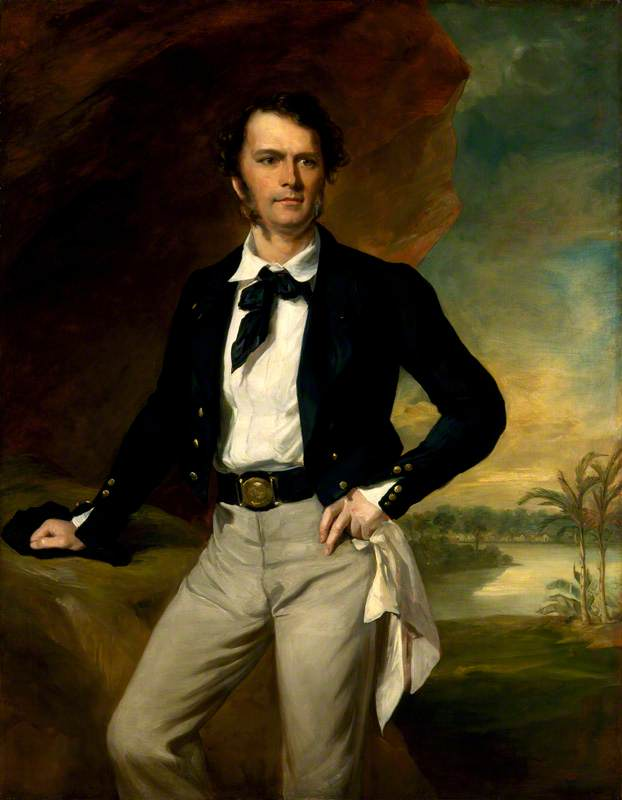
Portrait of Sir James Brooke, 1847

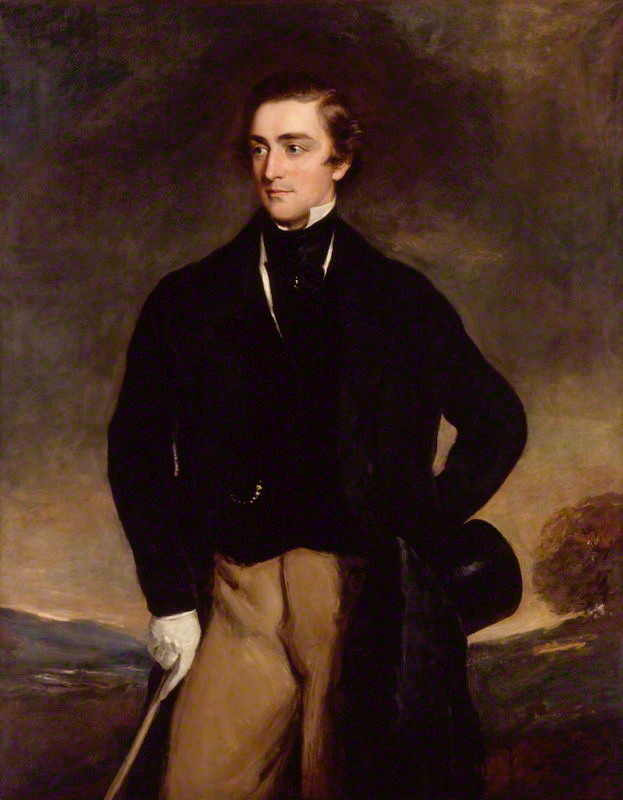
Portrait of Sidney Herbert, 1847

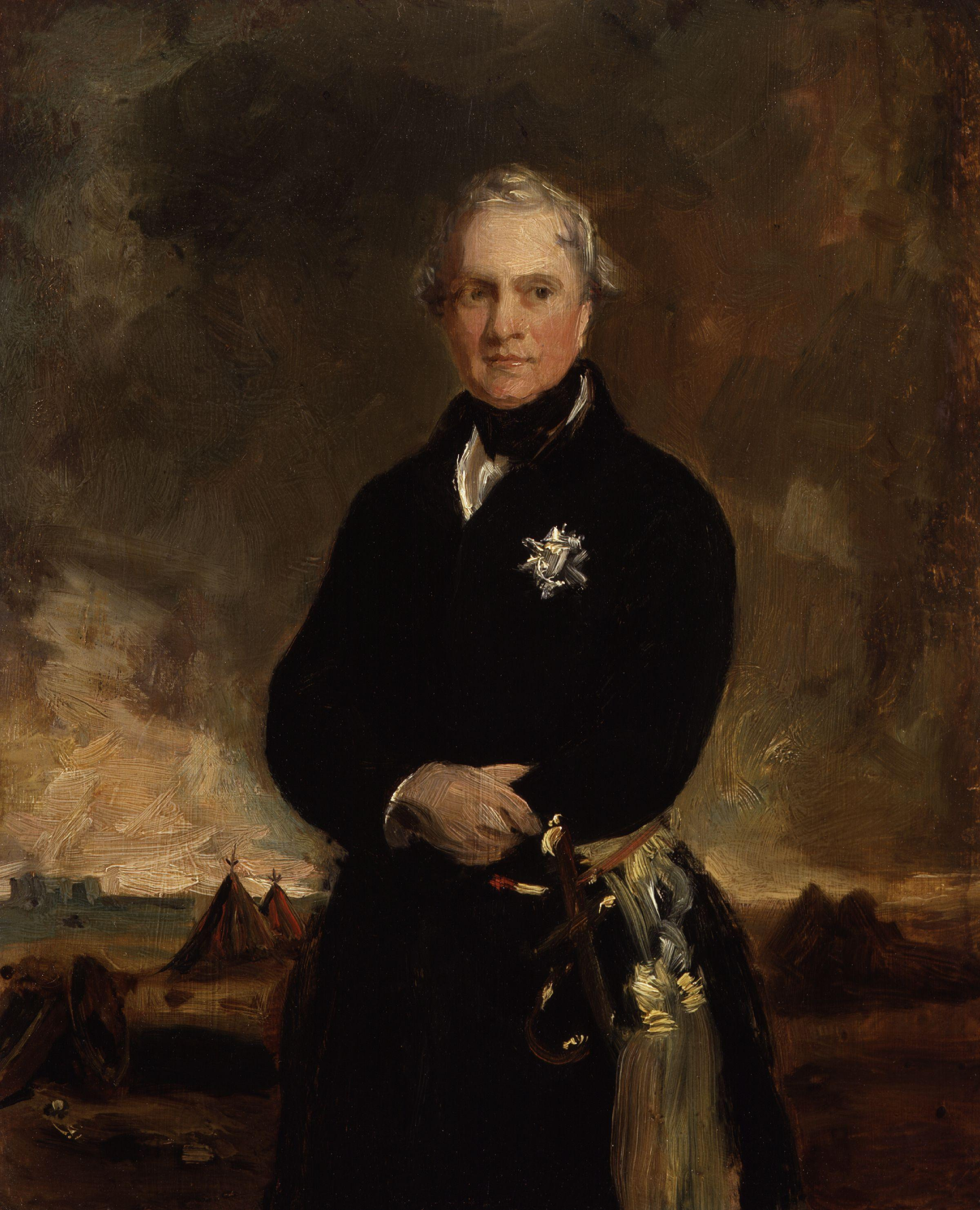
Lord Hardinge, c.1849

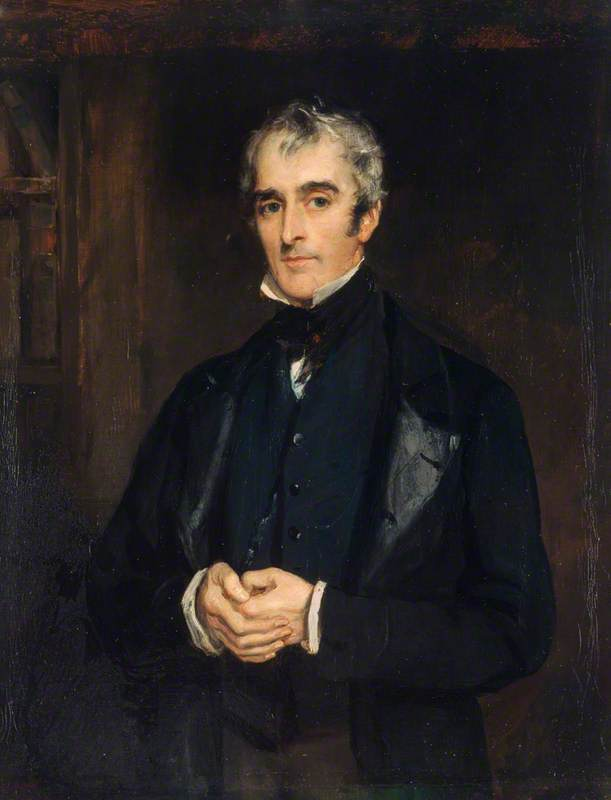
Portrait of John Gibson Lockhart, 1850

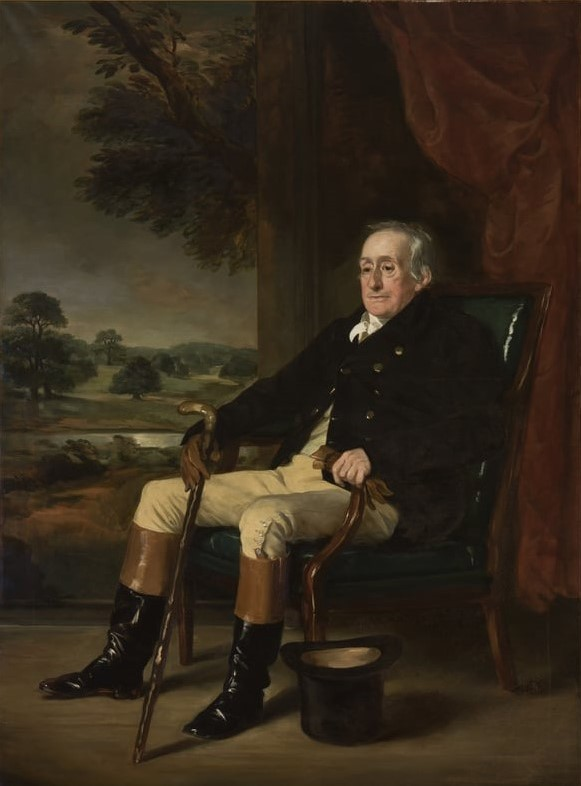
Portrait of the Duke of Portland, 1852

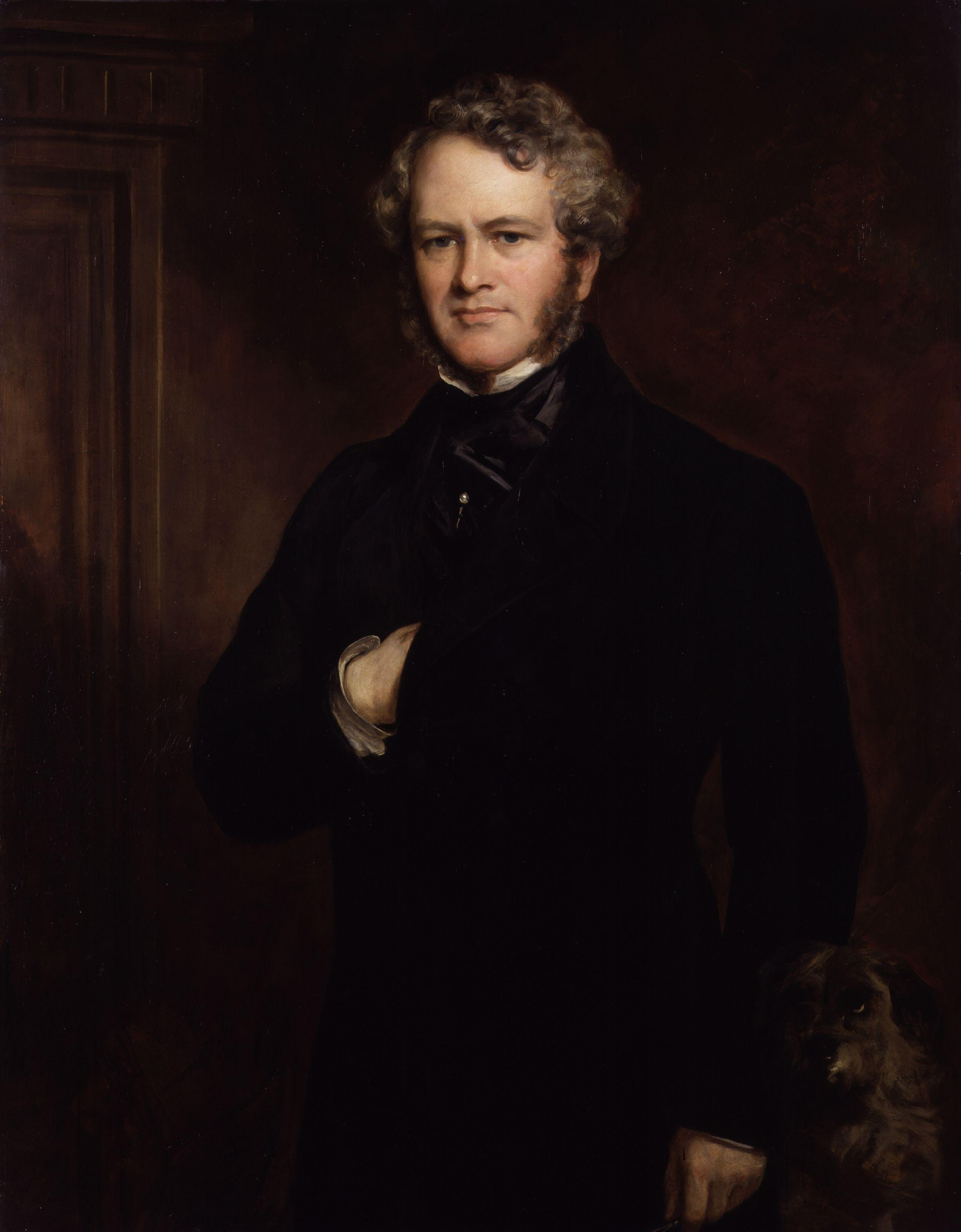
Portrait of Sir Edwin Landseer, 1852

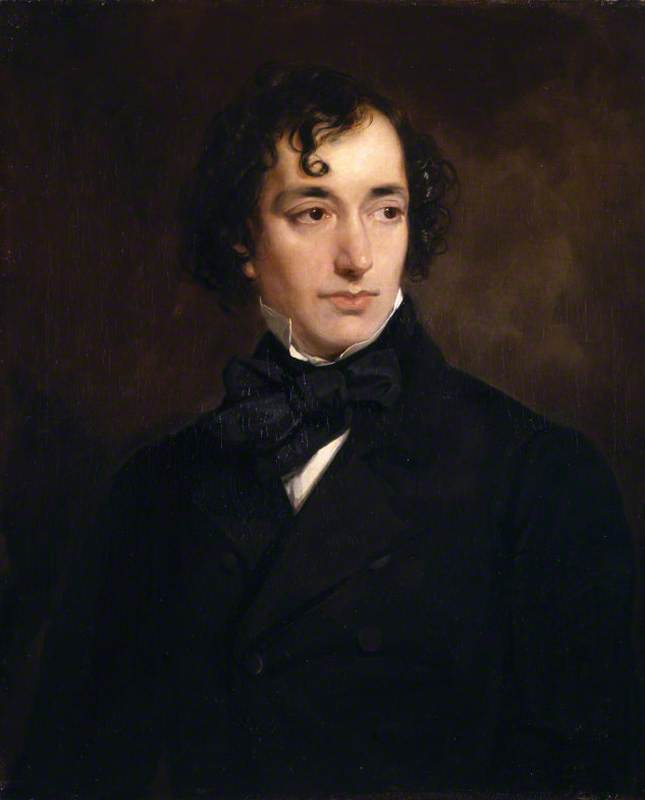
Portrait of Benjamin Disraeli, 1852

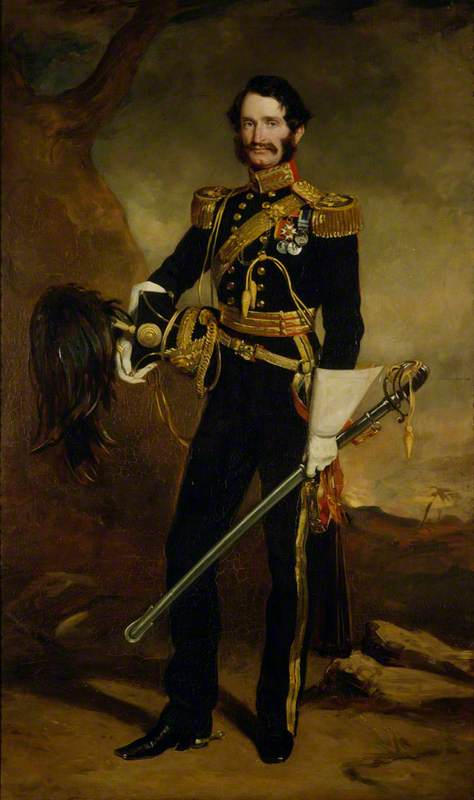
Portrait of Hope Grant, 1853

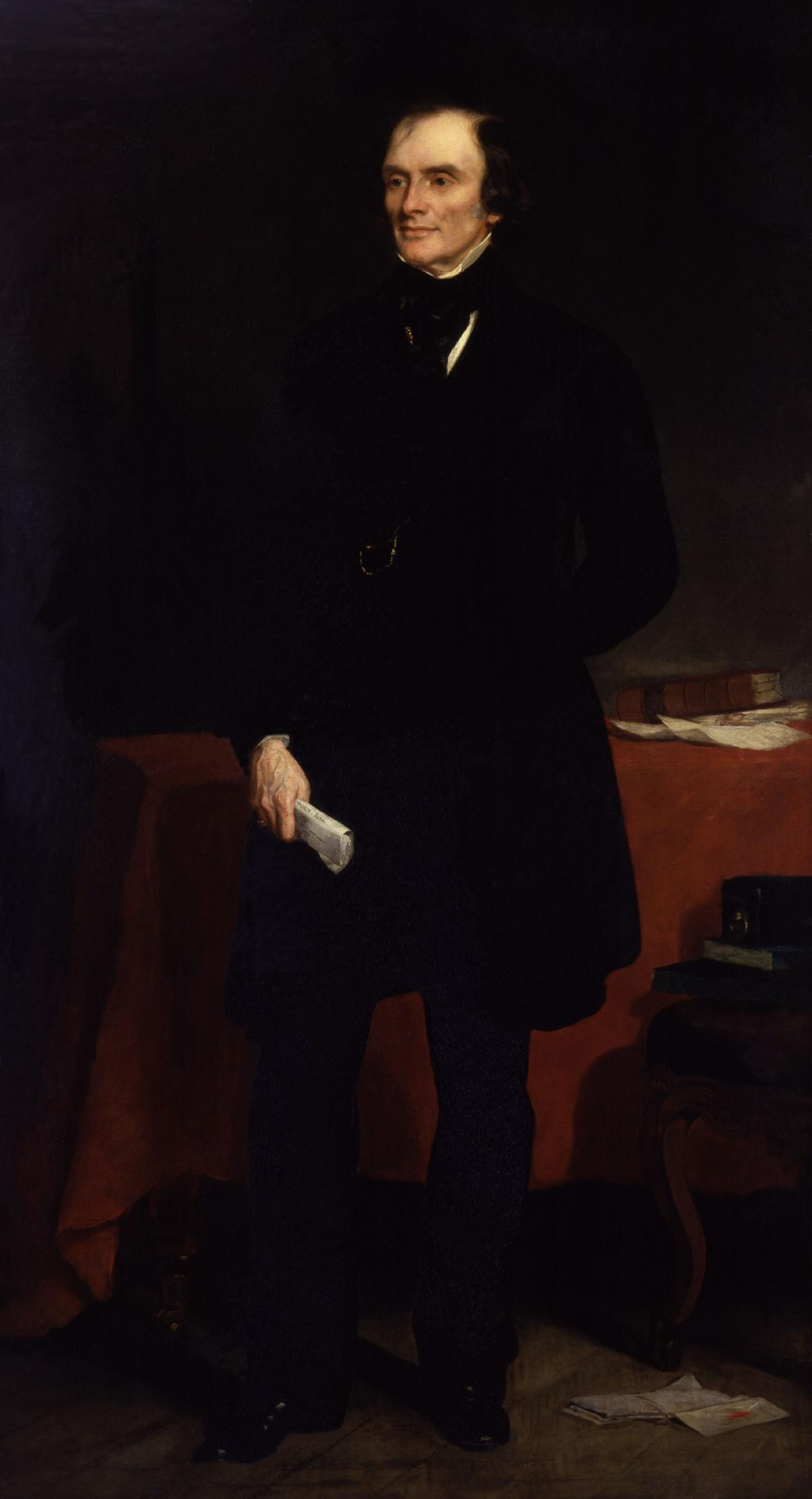
Portrait of Lord John Russell, 1853

Lady Londonderry, 1853

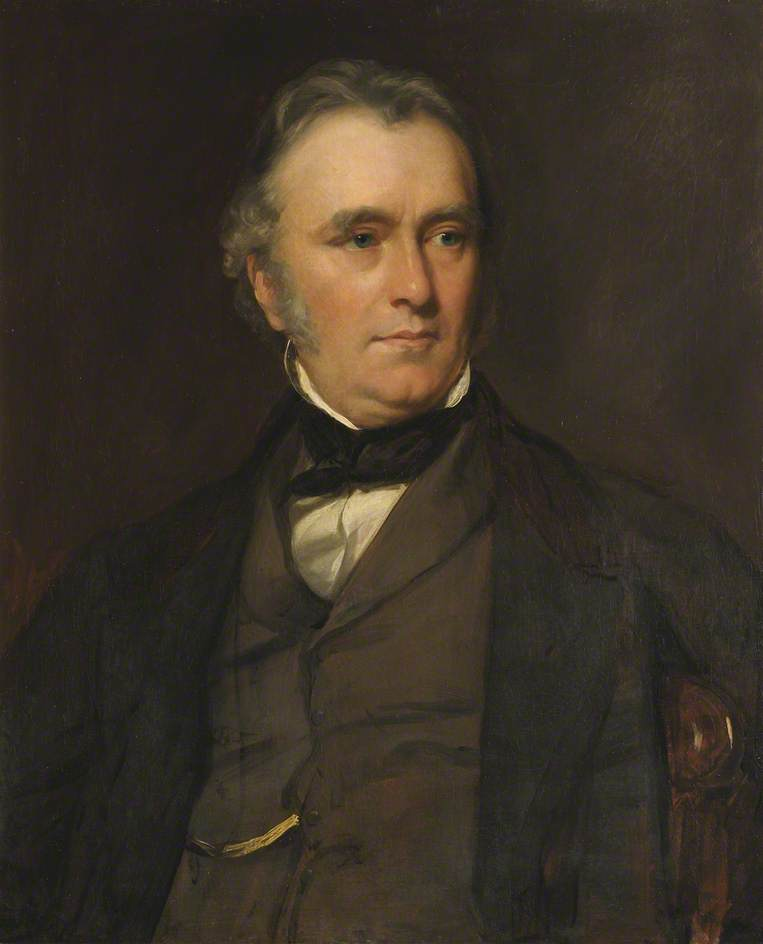
Portrait of Thomas Babington Macaulay, 1853

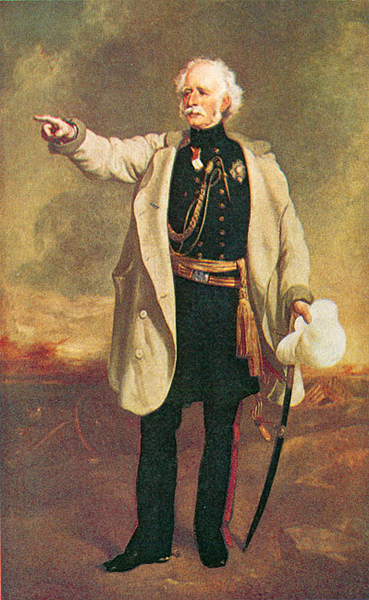
General Hugh Gough, 1854

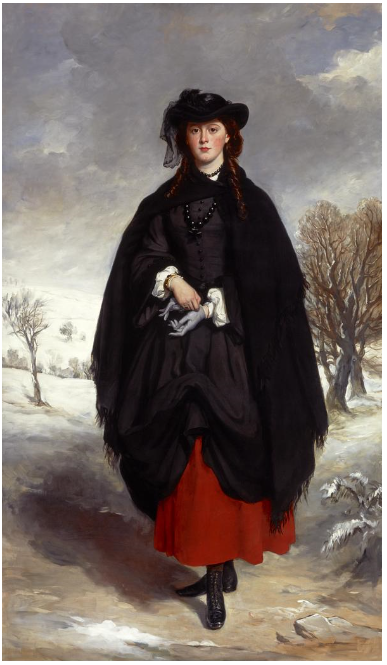
Portrait of Daisy Grant, 1857

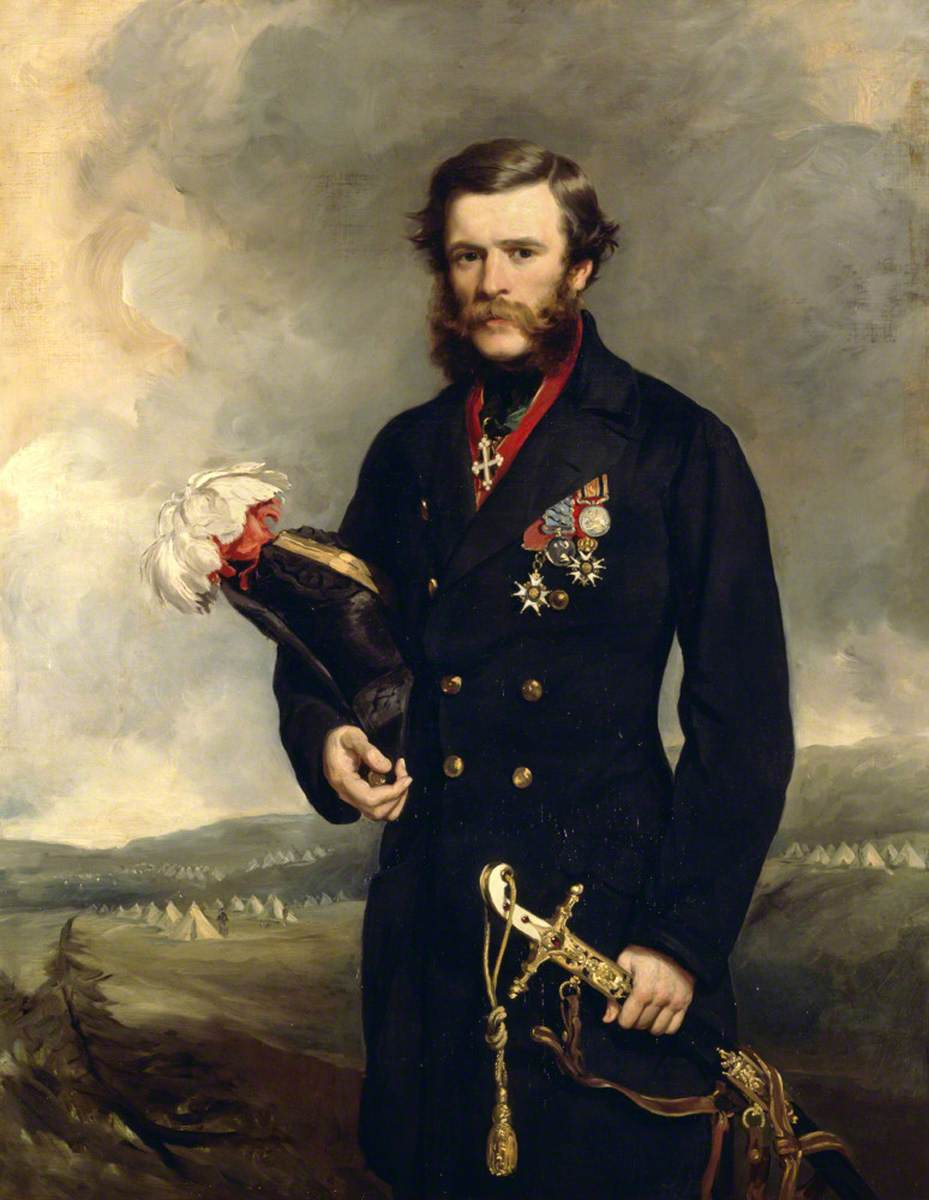
Percy Egerton Herbert, 1857

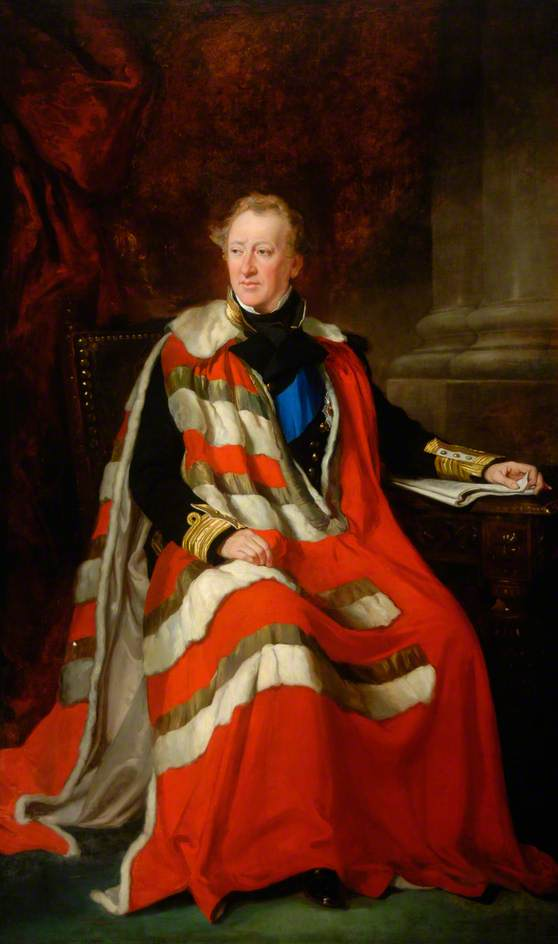
Duke of Northumberland, 1858

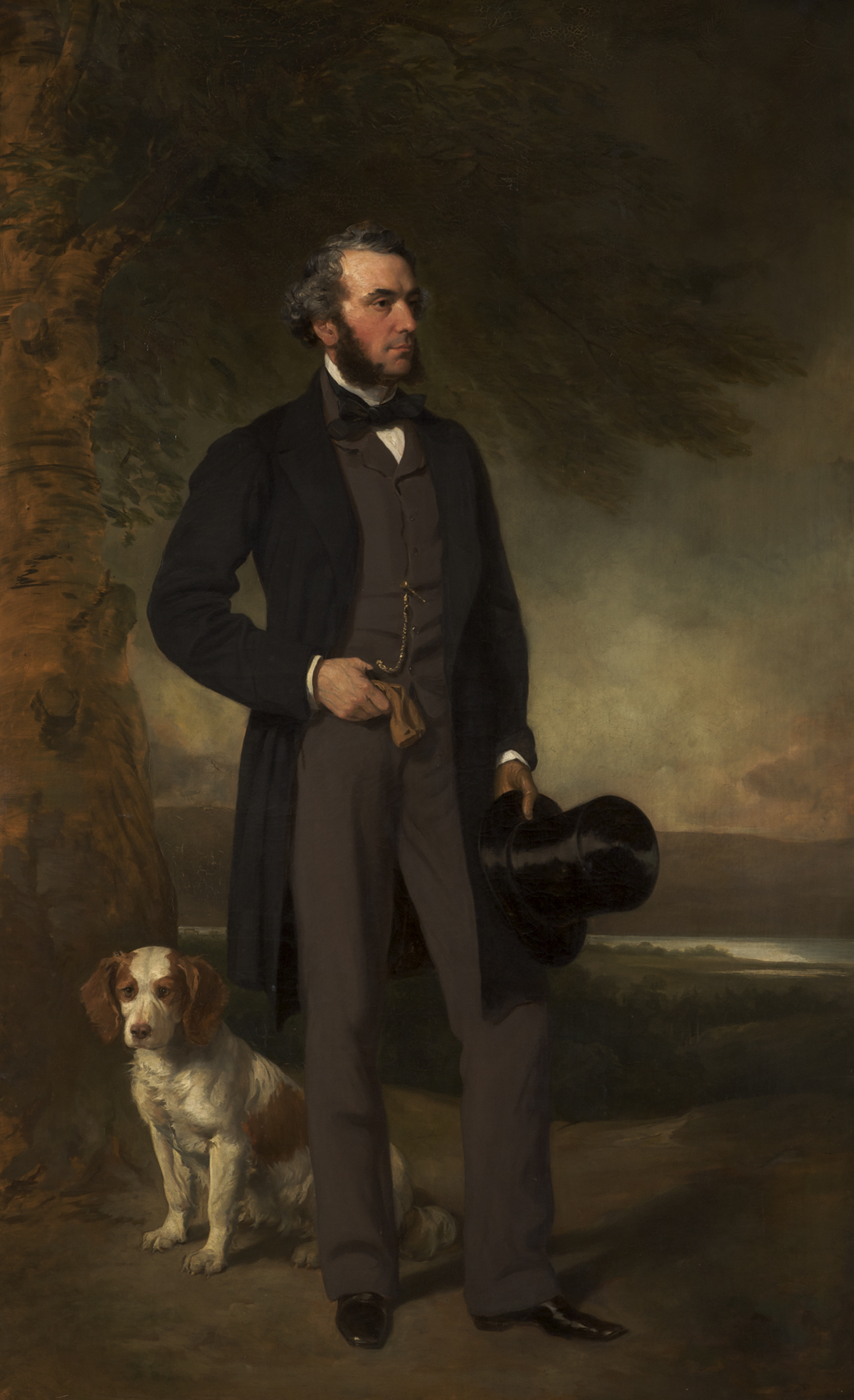
John Hick, 1861

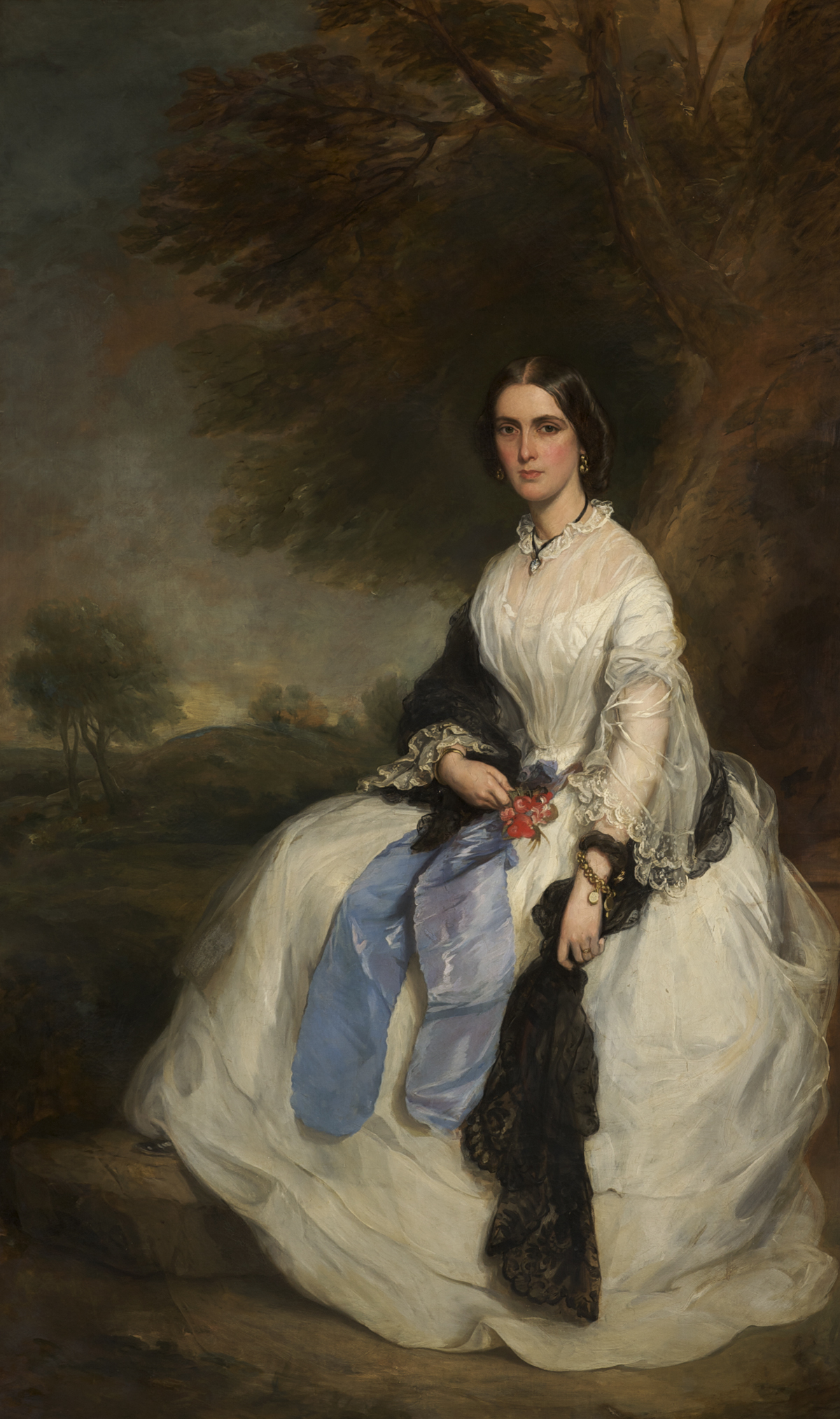
Margaret Hick, 1861

Lord de Tabley as Colonel of the Cheshire Yeomanry, 1861

Anna Brassey, 1864

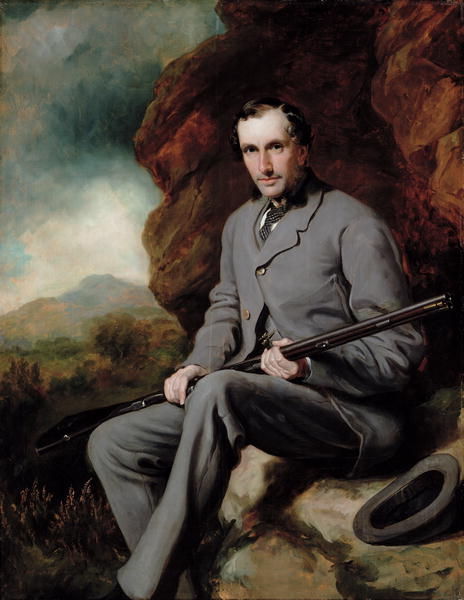
Hugo Meynell-Ingram, 1865

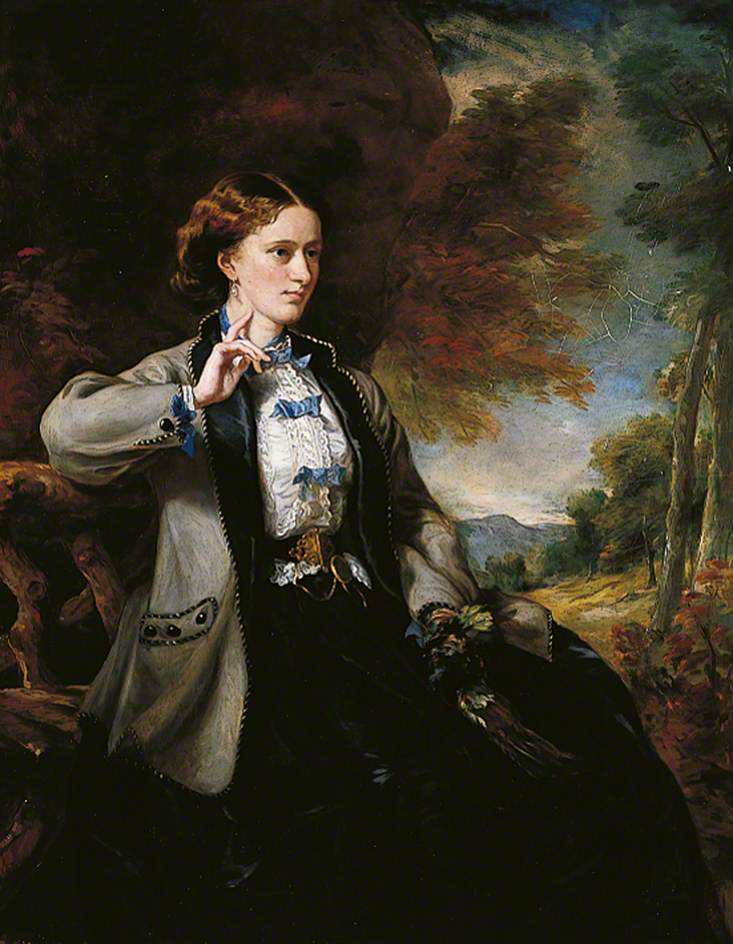
Emily Meynell-Ingram, 1867

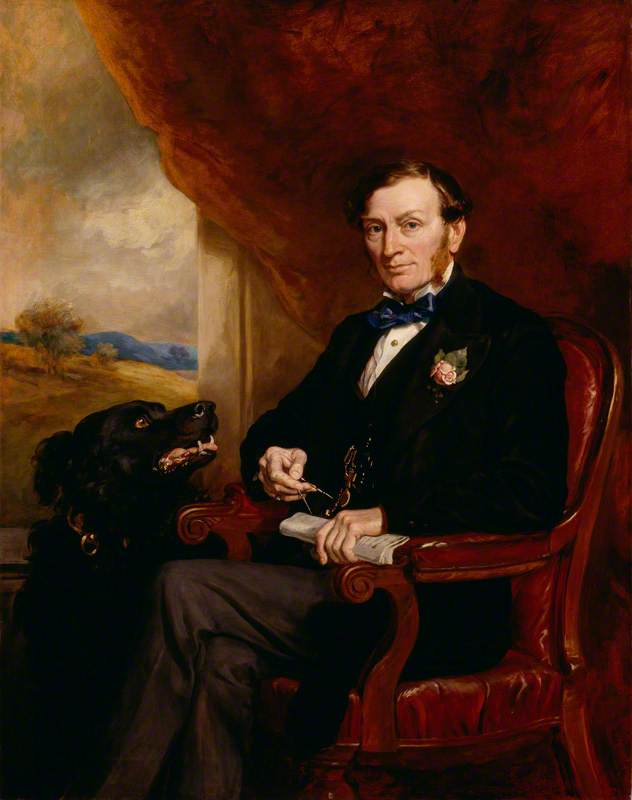
Daniel Gooch, 1872

Cultural offices
Preceded by Sir Charles Lock Eastlake	President of the Royal Academy; 1866–1878	Succeeded by Frederic Leighton
