= 1853 in art =

Events from the year 1853 in art.

== Events ==
- 2 May – The Royal Academy Exhibition of 1853 opens at the National Gallery in London
- 15 May – Salon of 1853 opens in Paris
- Georges-Eugène Haussmann is selected as prefect to begin the re-planning of Paris.

== Works ==
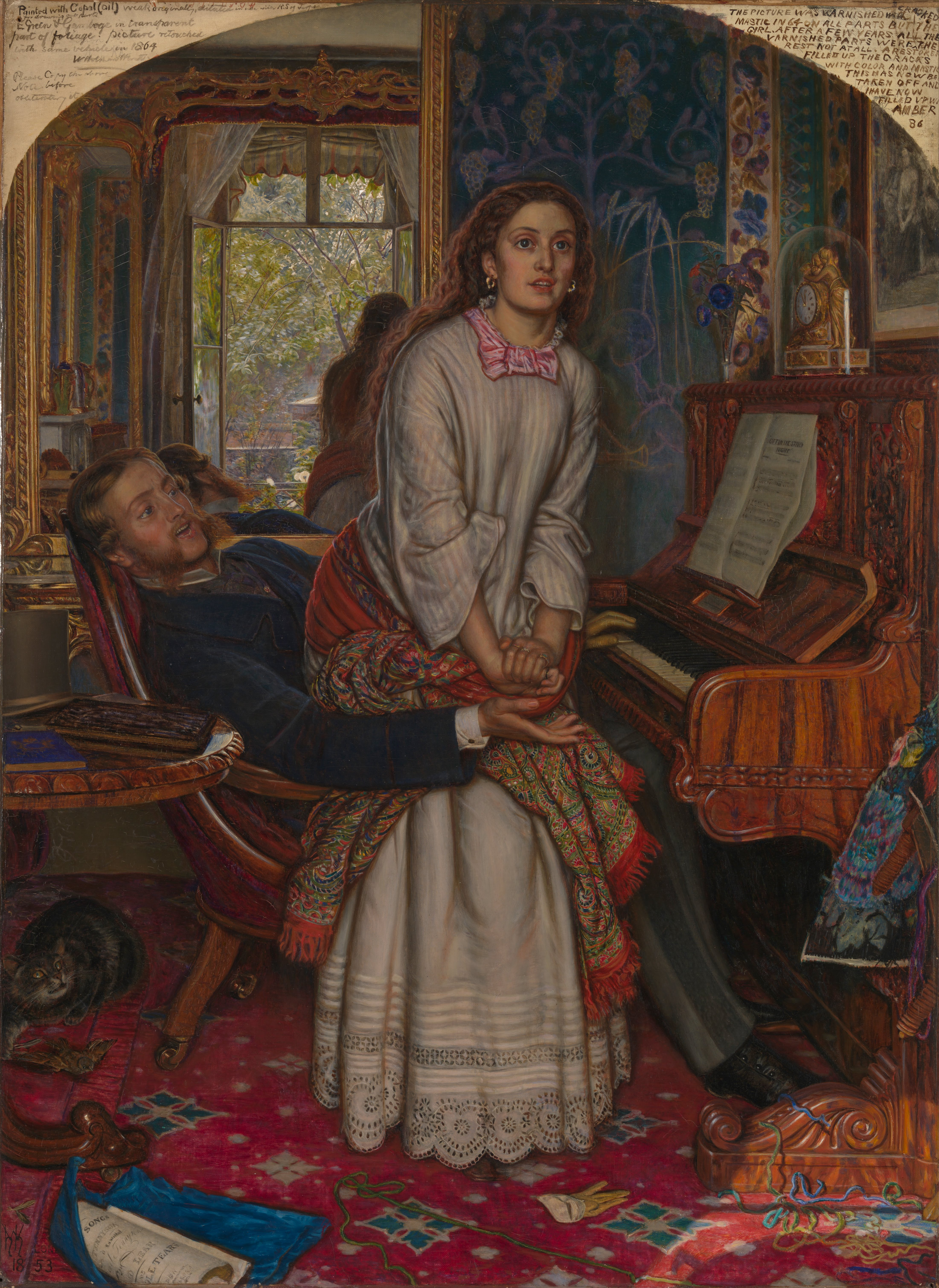
Holman Hunt – The Awakening Conscience

- Ivan Aivazovsky
  - Russian ships at the Battle of Sinop
  - The Battle of Sinop, 18th November 1853 (Night after the battle)
- Thomas Jones Barker – Wellington at Sorauren
- John Bell – A Daughter of Eve (bronze)
- Théodore Chassériau – Tepidarium (Musée d'Orsay, Paris)
- Federico de Madrazo y Kuntz – Portrait of Amalia de Llano Countess of Vilches
- Walter Deverell
  - The Grey Parrot (c. 1852–53)
  - A Pet
- William Powell Frith – The Sleeping Model
- Frederick Goodall – An Episode in the Happier Days of Charles I
- Francis Grant
  - Portrait of Hope Grant
  - Portrait of Lord John Russell
  - Portrait of Thomas Babington Macaulay
- Holman Hunt – The Awakening Conscience
- Jean-Auguste-Dominique Ingres
  - The Apotheosis of Napoleon I (destroyed by fire in 1871)
  - Princesse Albert de Broglie
- Charles-Auguste Lebourg – Negro child playing with a lizard (Enfant nègre jouant avec un lézard, bronze)
- John Martin – completion of the triptych The Last Judgement, The Great Day of His Wrath and The Plains of Heaven
- John Everett Millais
  - The Order of Release
  - The Proscribed Royalist, 1651
- Gustave Moreau – The Song of Songs
- David Roberts – Interior of the Cathedral of St Stephen, Vienna
- Clarkson Stanfield – The Last of the Crew
- Christian Friedrich Tieck – Nicolaus Copernicus Monument in Toruń (posthumous casting)
- Henry Wallis – The Room in Which Shakespeare Was Born
- Edward Matthew Ward
  - The Execution of the Marquis of Montrose
  - Josephine Signing the Act of Her Divorce
  - Portrait of Thomas Babington Macaulay
- Franz Xaver Winterhalter – Florinda
- Albert Wolff – sculptures in Berlin
  - Athena Leads the Young Warrior into the Fight
  - Athena Teaches the Young Man How to Use a Weapon
- Jules-Claude Ziegler – The Peace of Amiens

== Births ==
- February 26 – Nils Bergslien, Norwegian illustrator, painter and sculptor (died 1928)
- March 14 – Ferdinand Hodler, Swiss painter (died 1918)
- March 30
  - Frank O'Meara, Irish painter (died 1888)
  - Vincent van Gogh, Dutch painter (suicide 1890)
- May 13 – Adolf Hölzel, German artist/painter in an Impressionist to expressive modernism style (died 1934)
- May 28 – Carl Larsson, painter and illustrator (died 1919)
- September 5 – Giuseppe Barison, Italian painter (died 1931)
- October 30 – Louise Abbéma, French Impressionist painter, sculptor and designer (died 1927)
- December 9 – Laurits Tuxen, Danish painter and sculptor (died 1927)

== Deaths ==
- February 6 – August Kopisch, German poet and painter (born 1799)
- April 8 – Jan Willem Pieneman, Dutch historical painter (born 1779)
- June 12 – Merry-Joseph Blondel, French neo-classic painter (born 1781)
- July 15 – Wilhelm von Kobell, German painter, printmaker and teacher (born 1766)
- July 22 – Christoffer Wilhelm Eckersberg, Danish painter (born 1783)
- November 28 – Hans Bendel, Swiss painter (born 1814)
- December 28 – Sarah Goodridge, American painter who specialized in miniatures (born 1788)
- date unknown
  - Paweł Maliński, Czech-born sculptor and mason who lived and worked in Poland (born 1790)
  - Tang Yifen, Chinese landscape painter and calligrapher during the Qing dynasty (born c.1778)
