= Portrait of Thomas Babington Macaulay =

Portrait of Thomas Babington Macaulay may refer to:

- Portrait of Thomas Babington Macaulay (Grant)
- Portrait of Thomas Babington Macaulay (Ward)
