= The Last Sleep of the Earl of Argyll =

Painting by Edward Matthew Ward

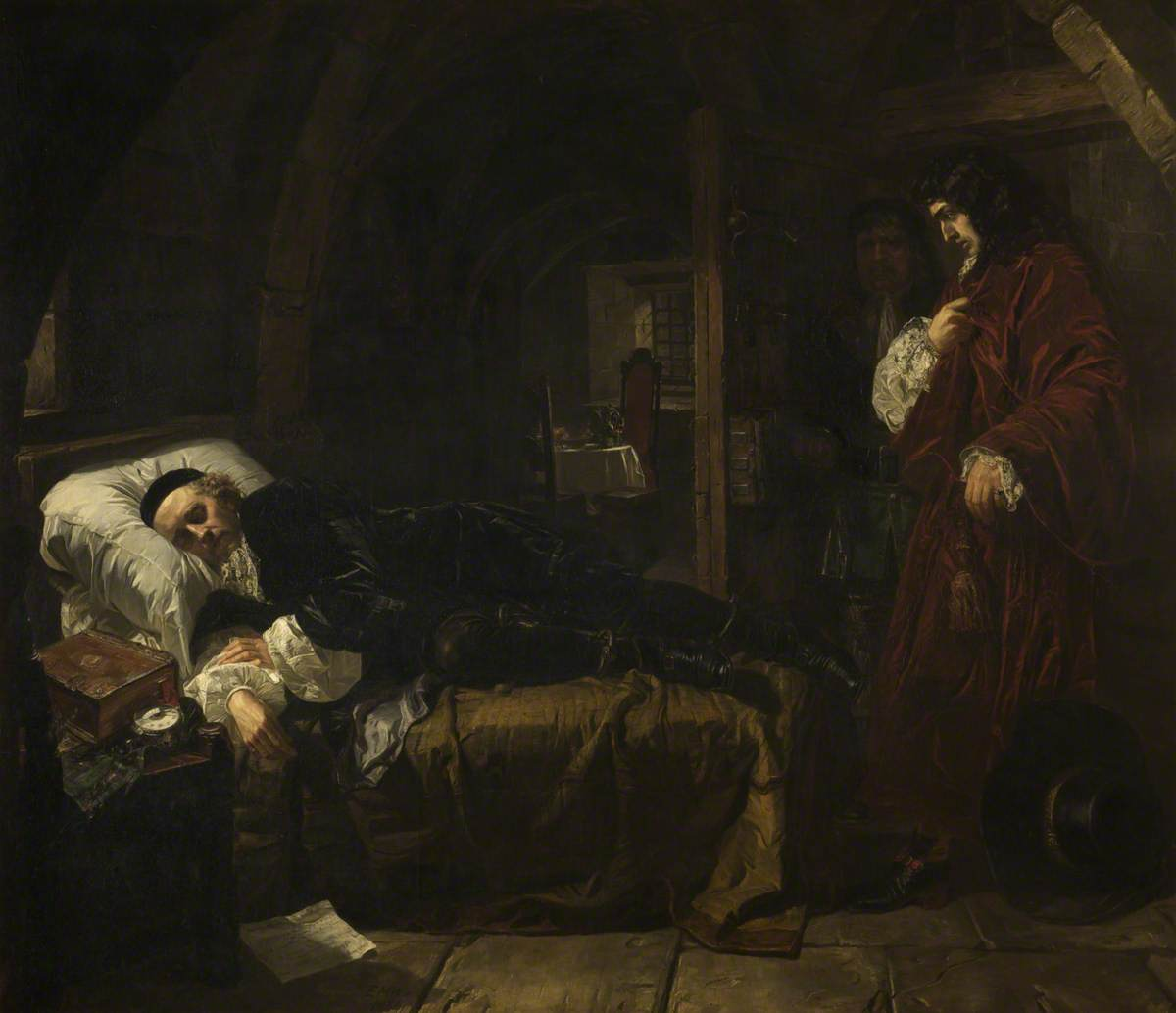
- Artist: Edward Matthew Ward
- Year: 1854
- Type: Oil on canvas, history painting
- Dimensions: 201 cm × 231 cm (79 in × 91 in)
- Location: Salford Museum and Art Gallery, Greater Manchester

'The Last Sleep of the Earl of Argyll is an 1854 history painting by the British artist Edward Matthew Ward. It shows the Scottish Covenanter leader Earl of Argyll calmly asleep in Edinburgh Castle the night before he was executed for leading Argyll's Rising in 1685 against James VII.

Ward originally prepared the picture for the rebuilt Houses of Parliament, but its large size prevented it being hung there. The painting was displayed at the Royal Academy Exhibition of 1854 held at the National Gallery in London. Both this and its companion piece The Execution of the Marquis of Montrose are in the collection of Salford Museum and Art Gallery, having been acquired in 1877. A smaller identical replica is owned by Birmingham Art Gallery.

== Bibliography ==
- Dafforne, James. The Life and Works of Edward Matthew Ward. Virtue and Company, 1879.
- David, Tracy C. Liberal Lives and Activist Repertoires: Political Performance and Victorian Social Reform. Cambridge University Press, 2023.
- Morris, Edward. Public Art Collections in North-west England: A History and Guide. Liverpool University Press, 2001.
