= View of the Pic du Midi d'Ossau in the Pyrenees =

1862 painting by Clarkson Stanfield

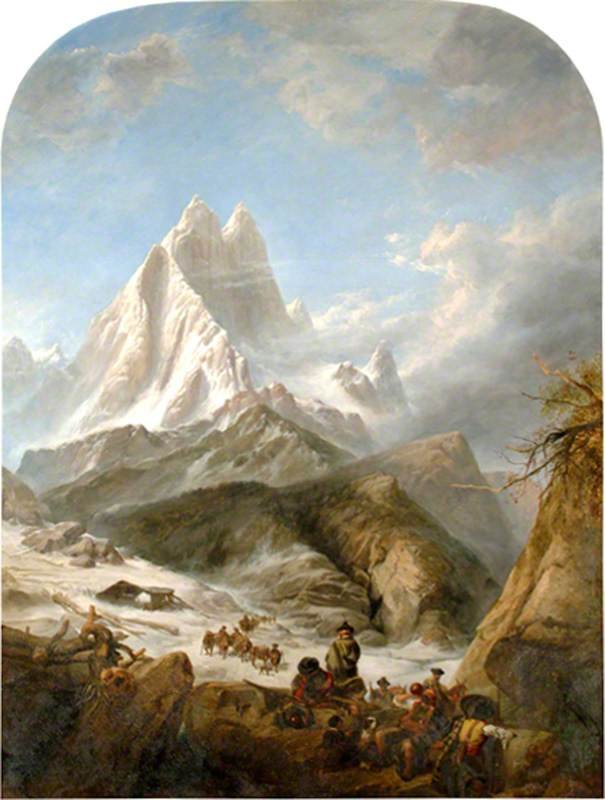
- Artist: Clarkson Stanfield
- Year: 1854
- Type: Oil on canvas, landscape painting
- Dimensions: 213.2 cm × 152.3 cm (83.9 in × 60.0 in)
- Location: Royal Holloway College, Surrey

View of the Pic du Midi d'Ossau in the Pyrenees is an 1854 landscape painting by the British artist Clarkson Stanfield. It depicts a view of the Pic du Midi d'Ossau in the Pyrenees. In the foreground are a group of brigands who are completely dominated by the scale of the mountain behind them.

Stanfield, who had first made his name as a scenic designer at the Theatre Royal, Drury Lane, was one of the leading British romantic painters, known for his seascapes in particular. A friend of Turner and Charles Dickens, he was by this point a veteran British artist. He displayed the picture at the Royal Academy Exhibition of 1854 at the National Gallery in London. Acquired by the art collector Thomas Holloway for 2,550 guineas in 1881, the painting now belongs to Royal Holloway and hangs in its campus in Surrey.

== Bibliography ==
- Chappel, Jeannie. Victorian Taste: The Complete Catalogue of Paintings at the Royal Holloway College. A. Zwemmer, 1982.
- Van der Merwe, Pieter & Took, Roger. The Spectacular career of Clarkson Stanfield. Tyne and Wear County Council Museums, 1979.
- Wright, Christopher, Gordon, Catherine May & Smith, Mary Peskett. British and Irish Paintings in Public Collections: An Index of British and Irish Oil Paintings by Artists Born Before 1870 in Public and Institutional Collections in the United Kingdom and Ireland. Yale University Press, 2006.
