= Royal Academy Exhibition of 1854 =

1854 art exhibition in London

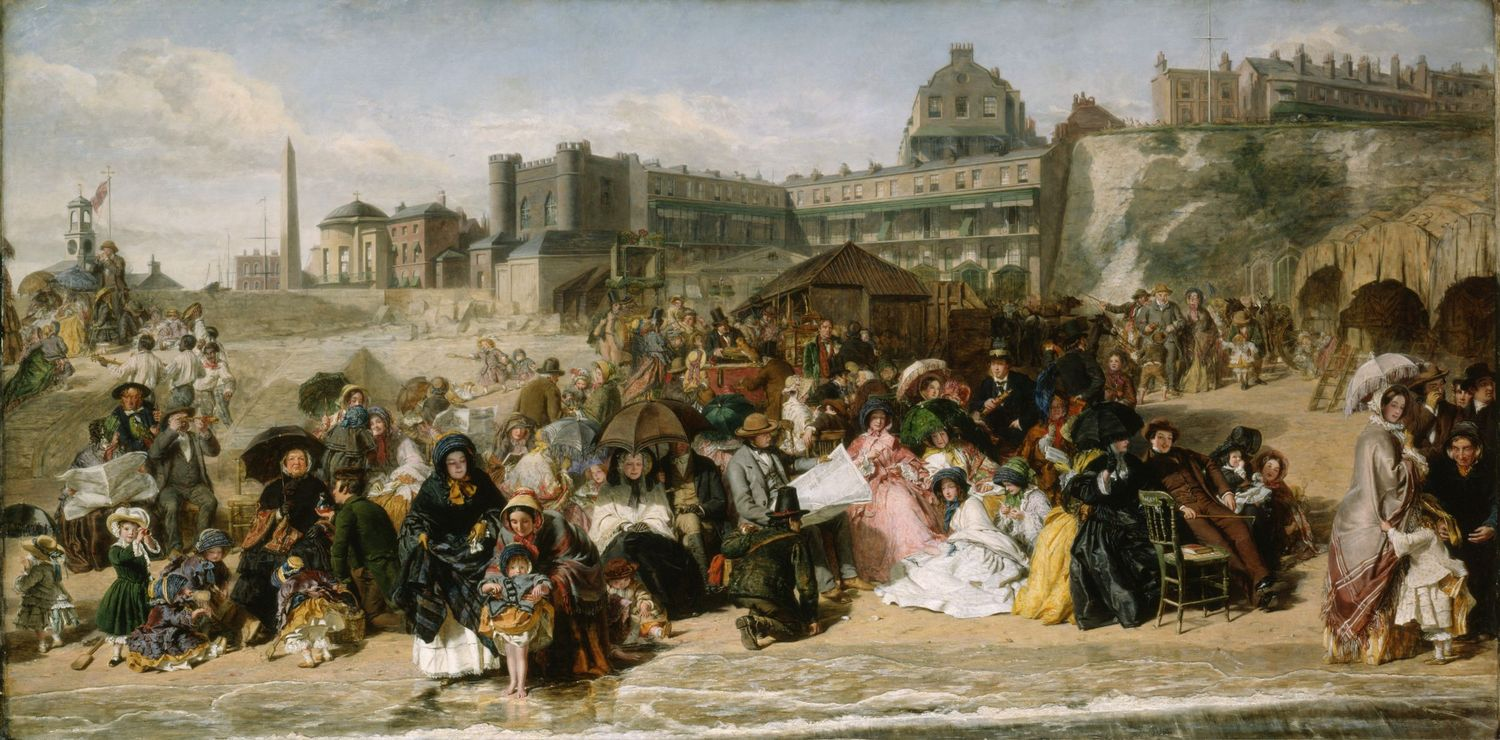
Ramsgate Sands by William Powell Frith

The Royal Academy Exhibition of 1854 was the eighty sixth annual Summer Exhibition of the British Royal Academy of Arts. It was held at the National Gallery in London from 1 May to 22 July 1854 during the Victorian era.

The works displayed by William Powell Frith and Daniel Maclise were amongst the most popular on display. Frith's Ramsgate Sands showed a scene of holidaymakers on the beach at Ramsgate in Kent and was so popular a guard rail had to be erected to protect it from damage. Queen Victoria was impressed by the painting when she visited the exhibition and subsequently purchased it. A number of other works on display depicted scenes of contemporary life including The Awakening Conscience by William Holman Hunt, The Governess by Rebecca Solomon and two scenes of railway travel First Class, The Meeting and Second Class, The Parting by her brother Abraham Solomon.

Elsewhere George Jones exhibited the large The Battle of Hyderabad. Clarkson Stanfield's The Last of the Crew portrayed the aftermatch of a shipwreck in a storm. Edwin Landseer displayed Royal Sports on Hill and Loch featuring a scene of Queen Victoria and her consort Prince Albert. Francis Grant submitted several portraits including one of the Irish general Hugh Gough. Of particular note was the artist's Portrait of Hope Grant, a depiction of his own brother Hope Grant.

== Gallery ==
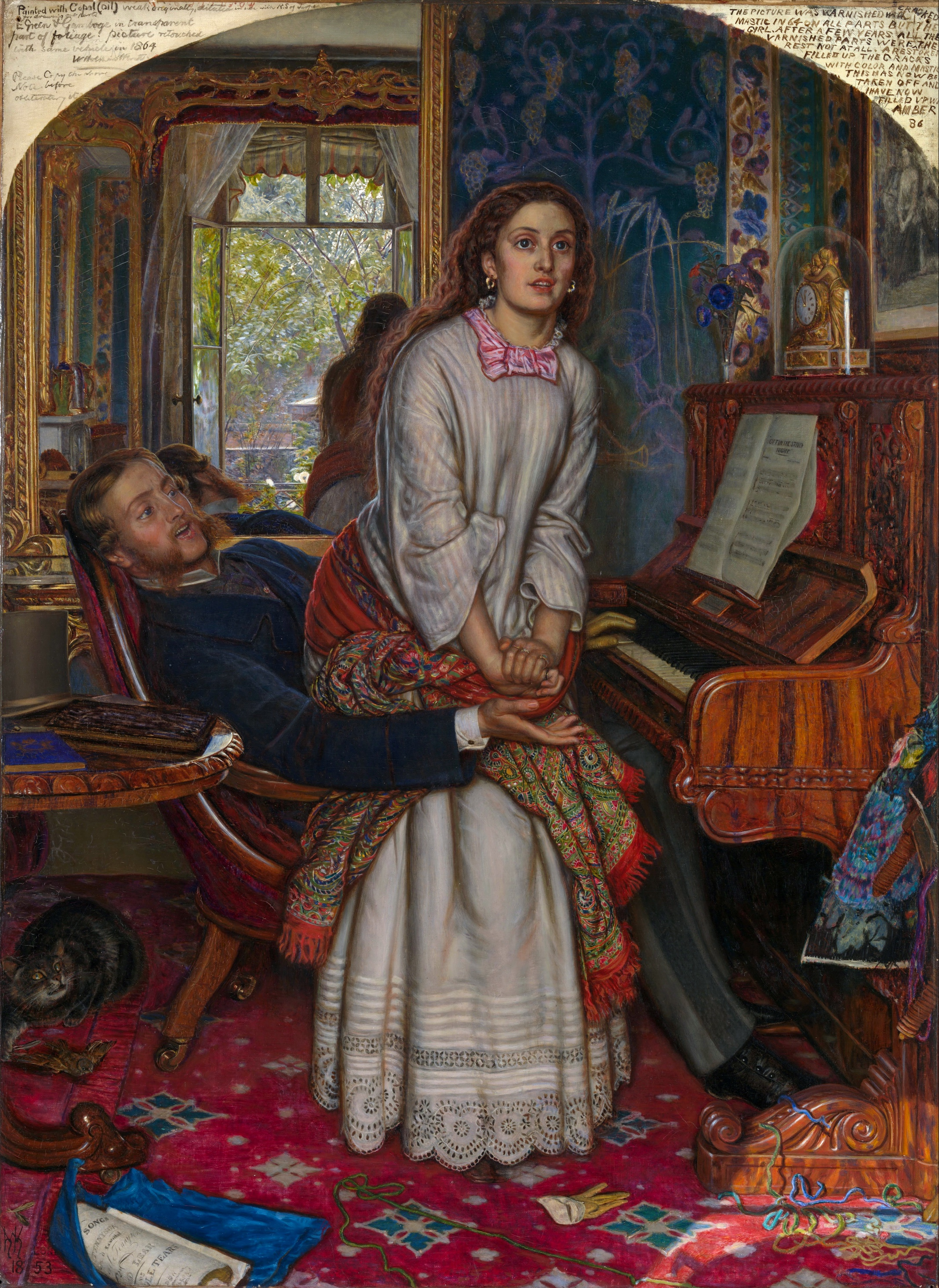
The Awakening Conscience by William Holman Hunt

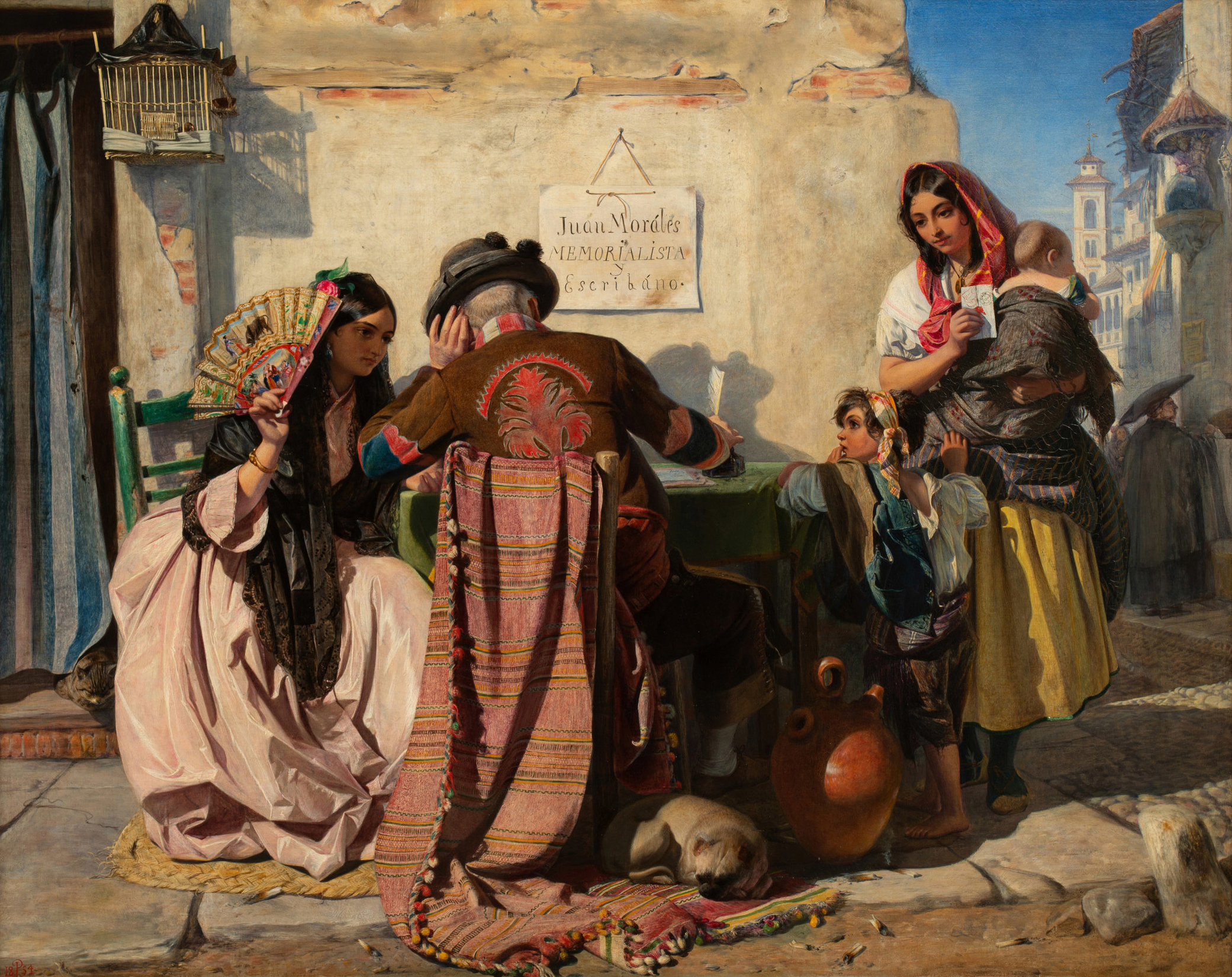
The Letter Writer of Seville by John Phillip

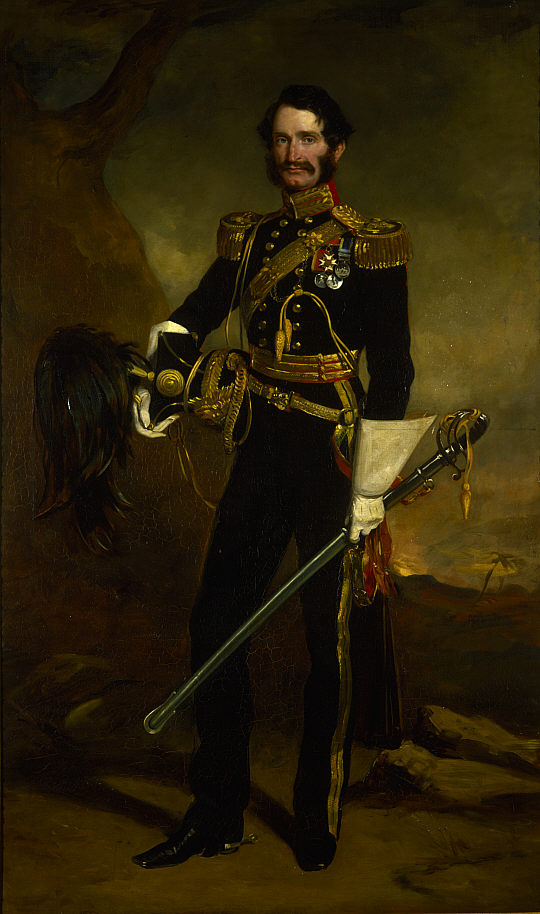
Portrait of Hope Grant by Francis Grant

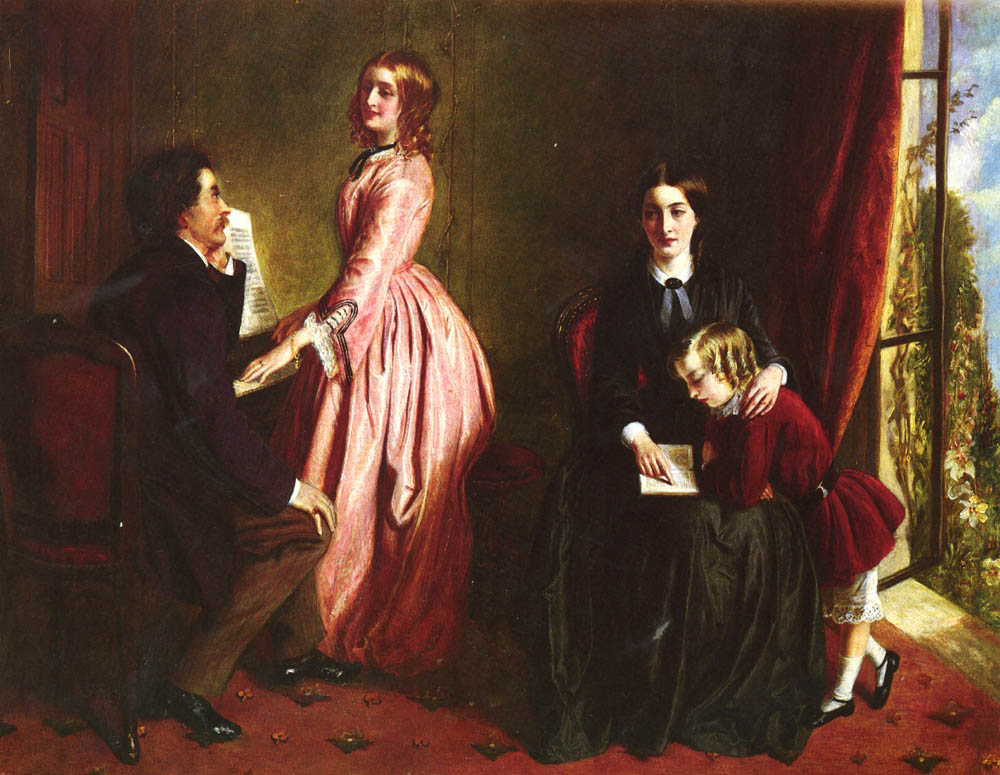
The Governess by Rebecca Solomon

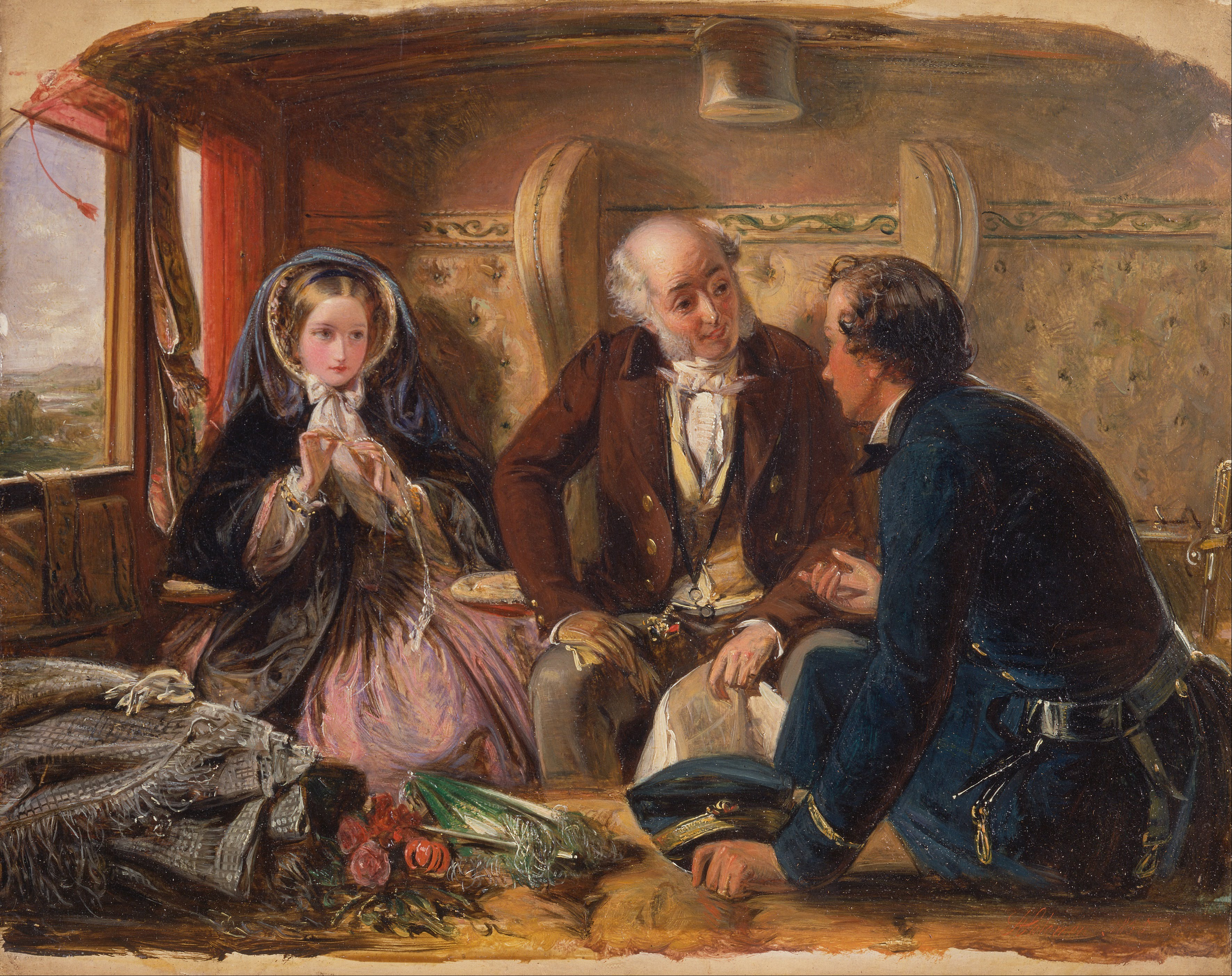
First Class - The Meeting by Abraham Solomon

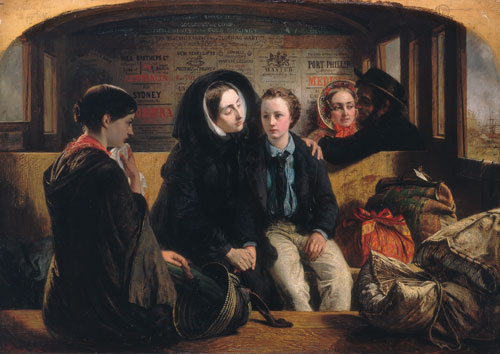
Second Class - The Parting by Abraham Solomon

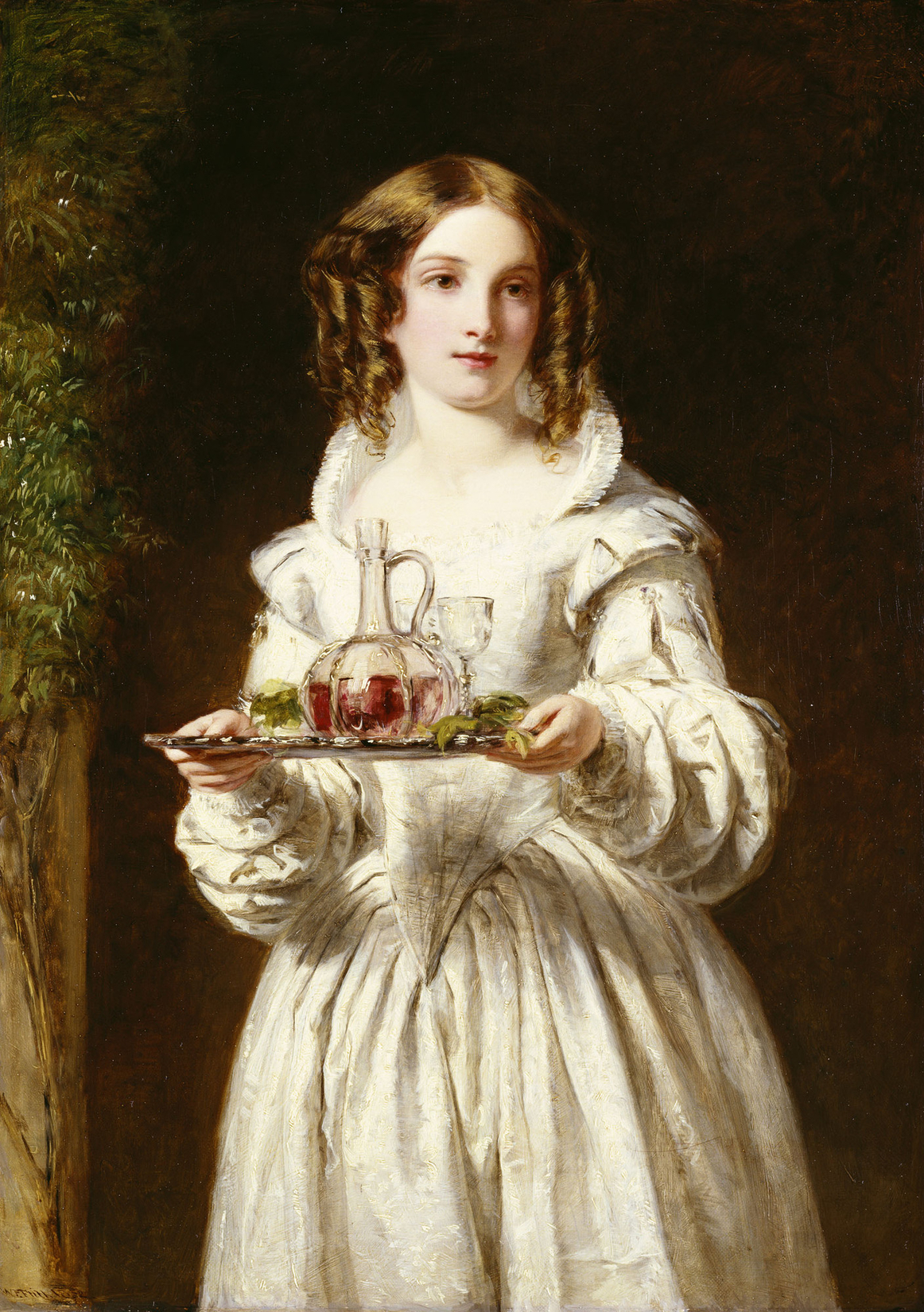
Anne Page by William Powell Frith

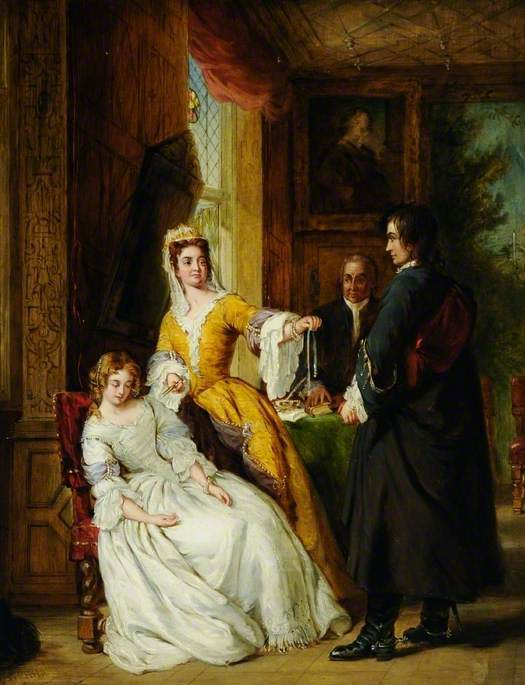
The Bride of Lammermoor by William Powell Frith

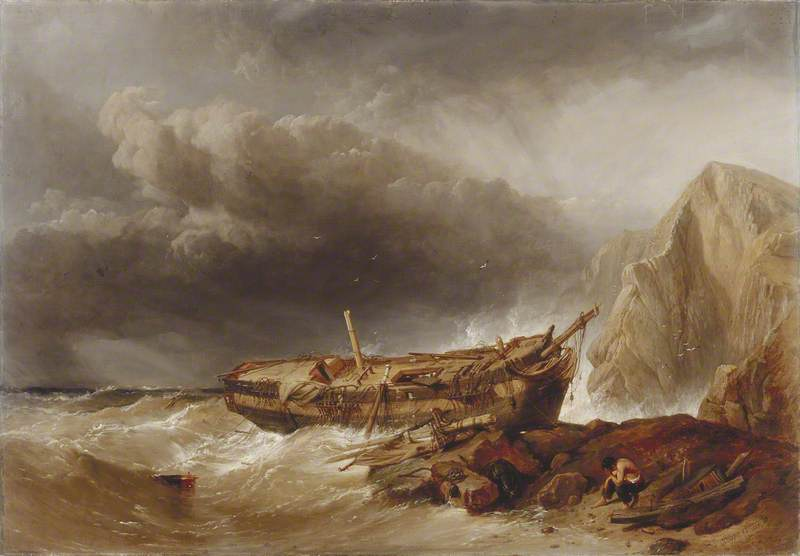
The Last of the Crew by Clarkson Stanfield

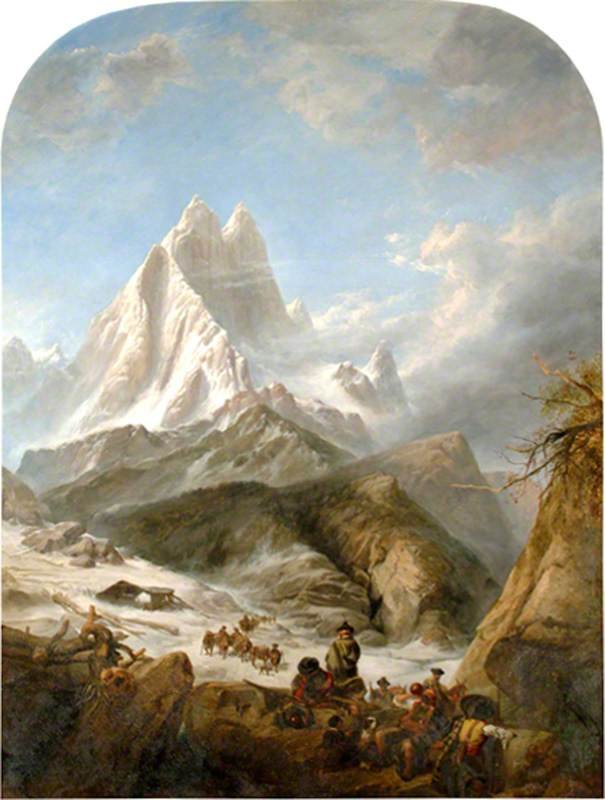
View of the Pic du Midi d'Ossau in the Pyrenees by Clarkson Stanfield

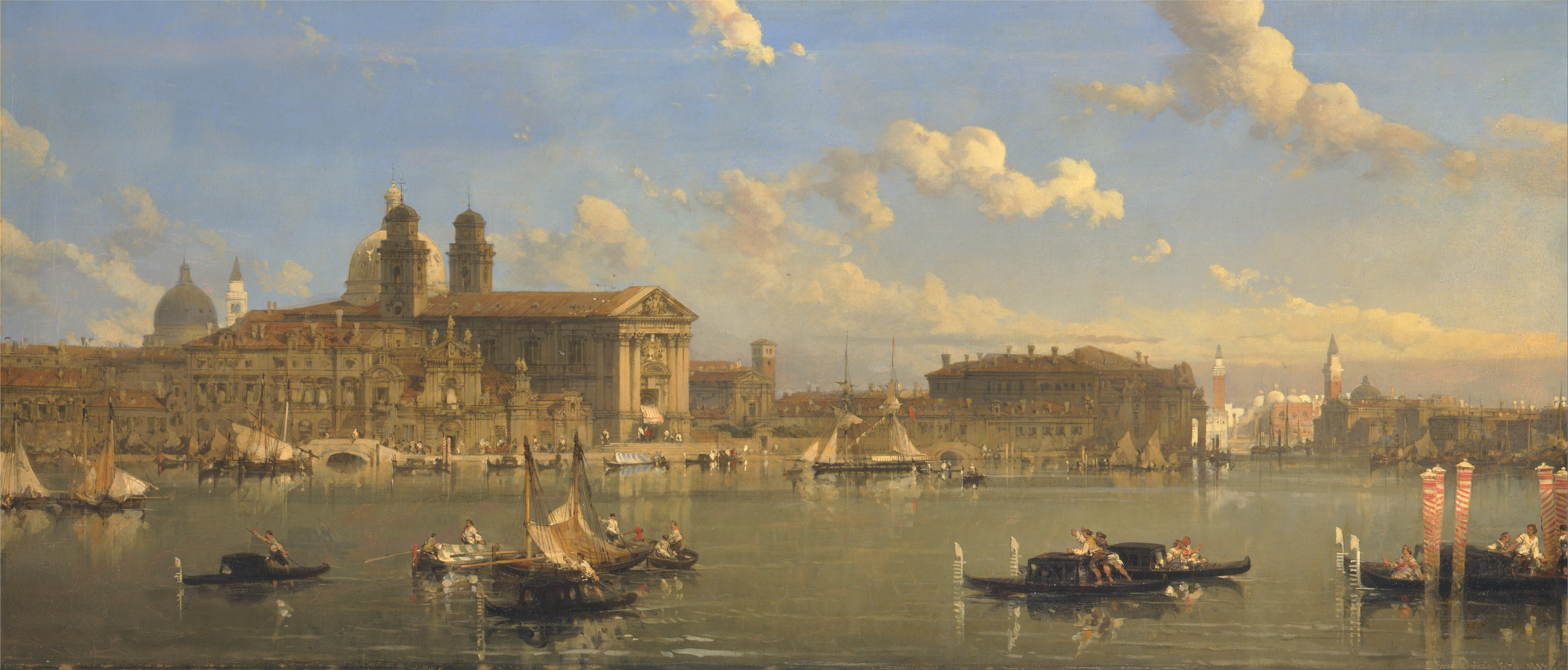
The Giudecca, Venice by David Roberts

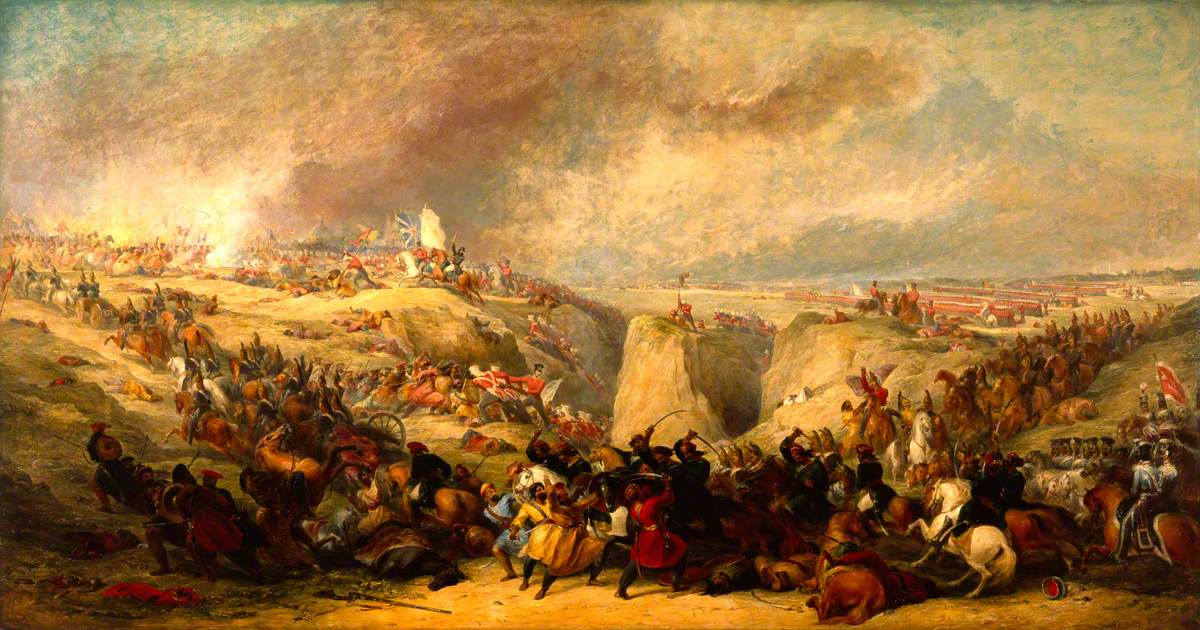
The Battle of Hyderabad by George Jones

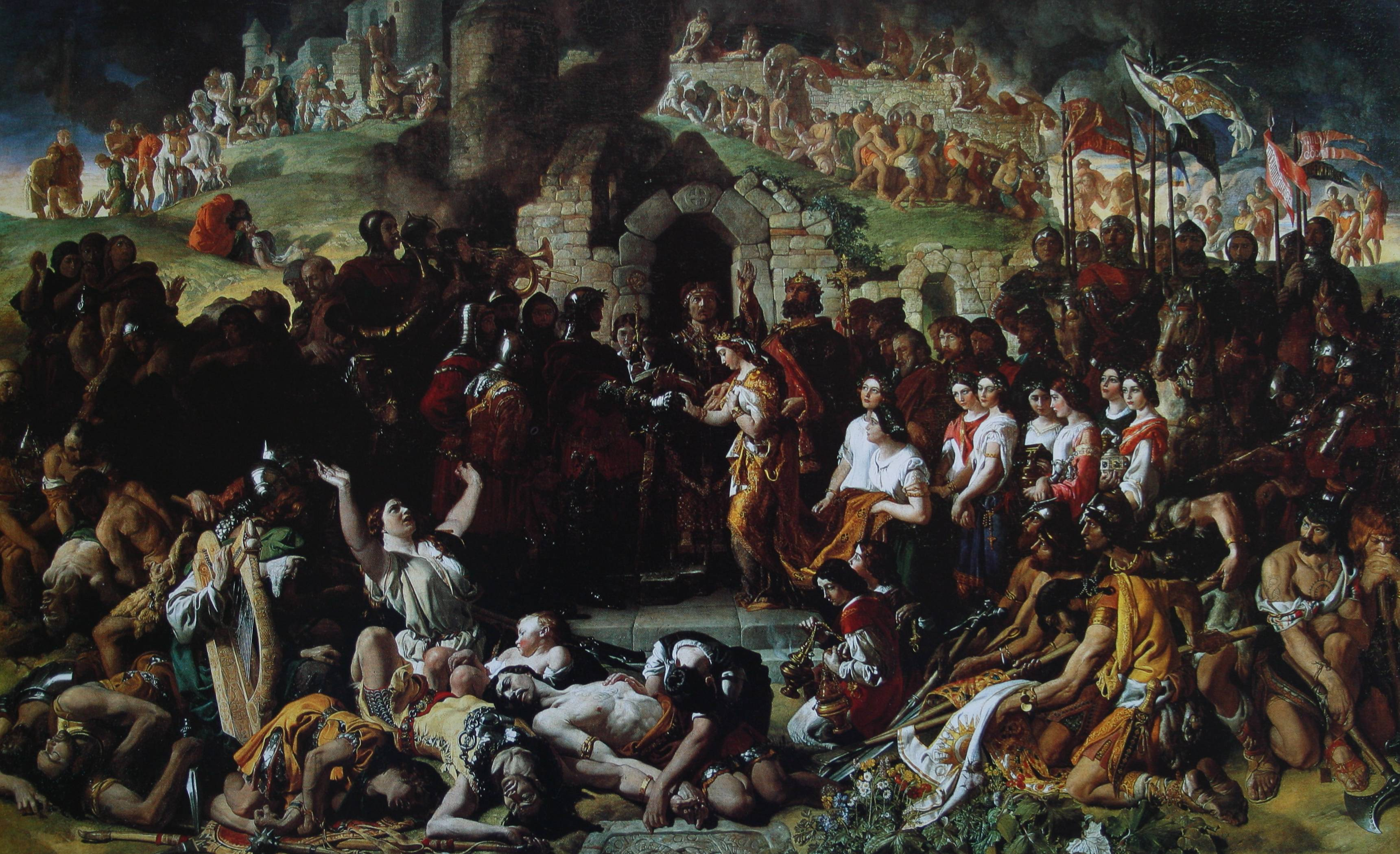
The Marriage of Strongbow and Aoife by Daniel Maclise

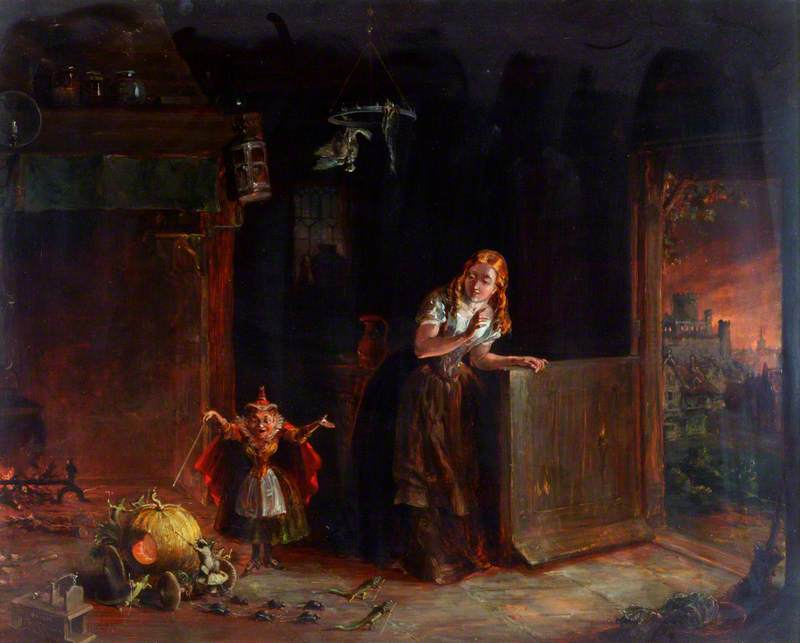
Cinderella by George Cruikshank

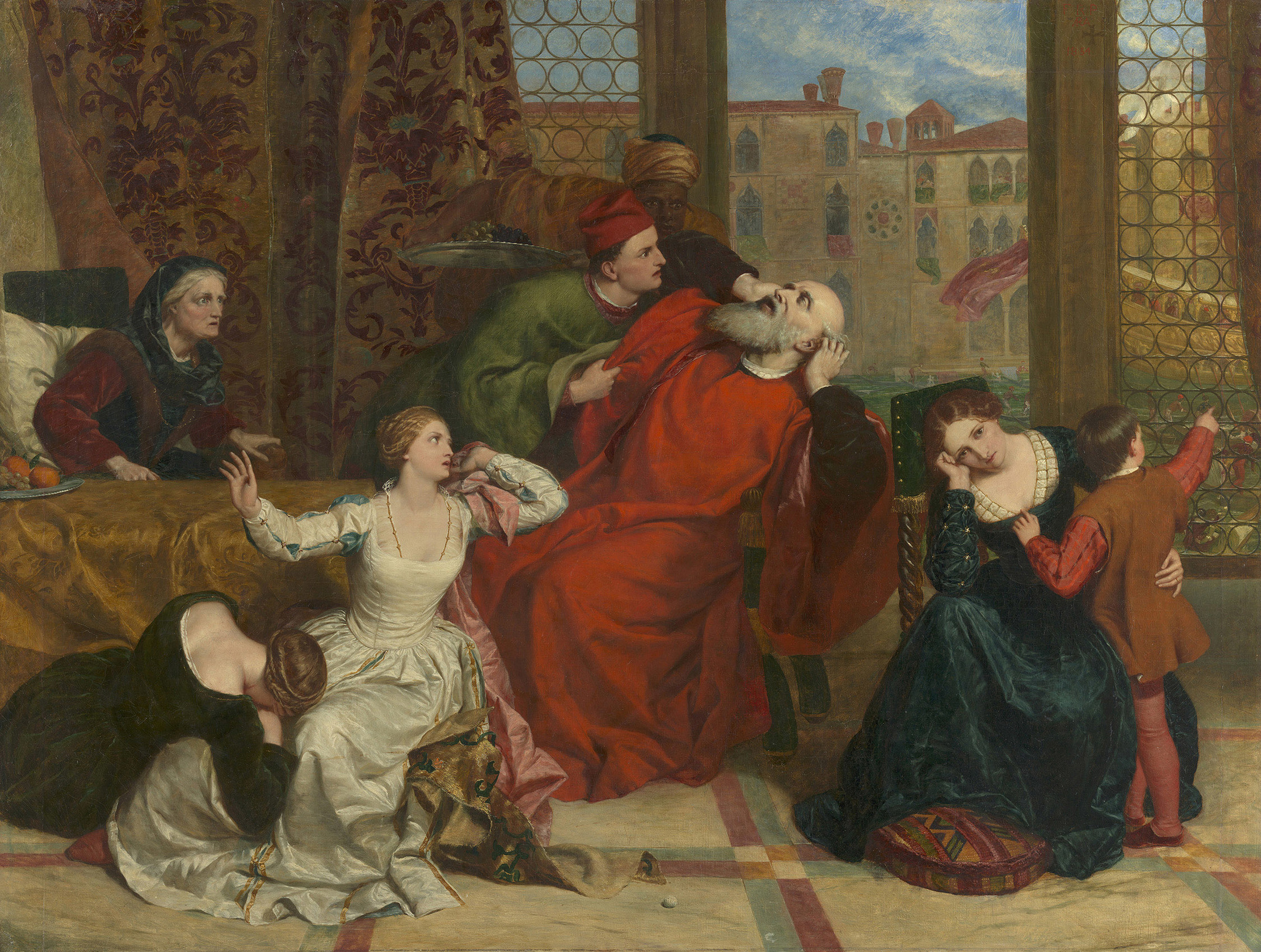
The Death of Francesco Foscari, Doge of Venice by Frederick Richard Pickersgill

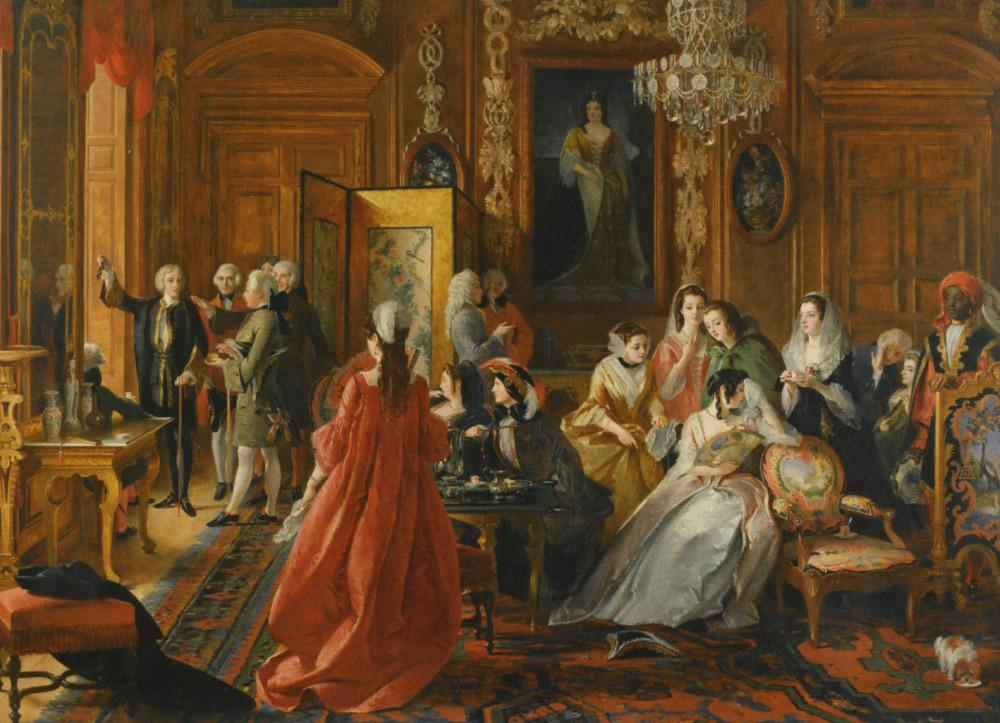
Sir Plume Demands the Restoration of the Lock by Charles Robert Leslie

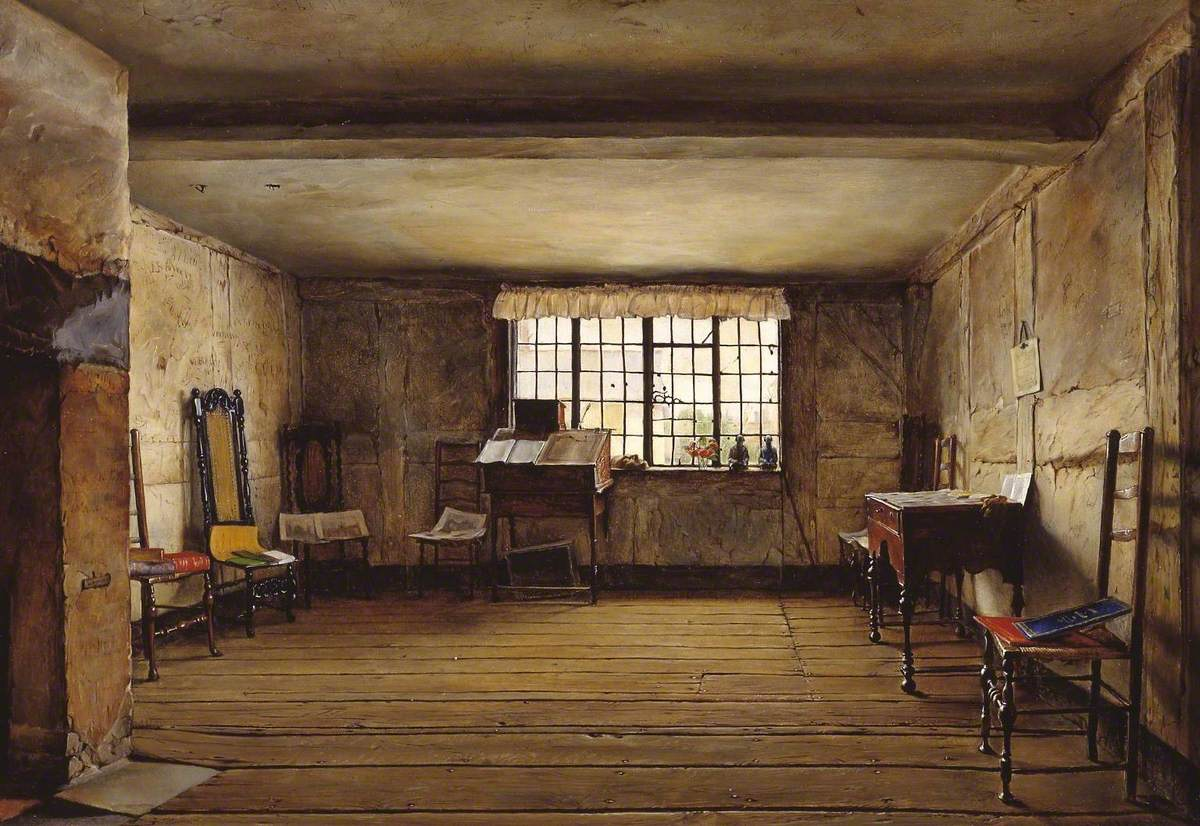
The Room in Which Shakespeare Was Born by Henry Wallis

Doctor Johnson at Cave's, the Publishers by Henry Wallis

Pleasant Dreams by Henry Nelson O'Neil

Chastity by William Edward Frost

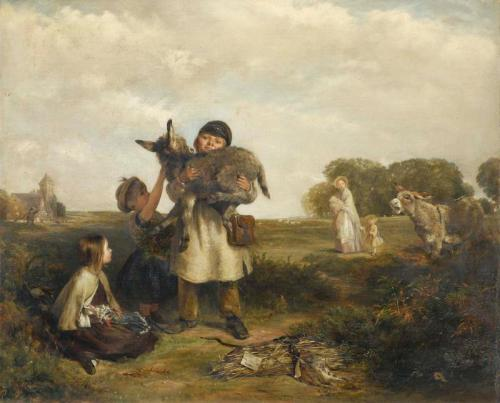
The Pet of the Common by John Callcott Horsley

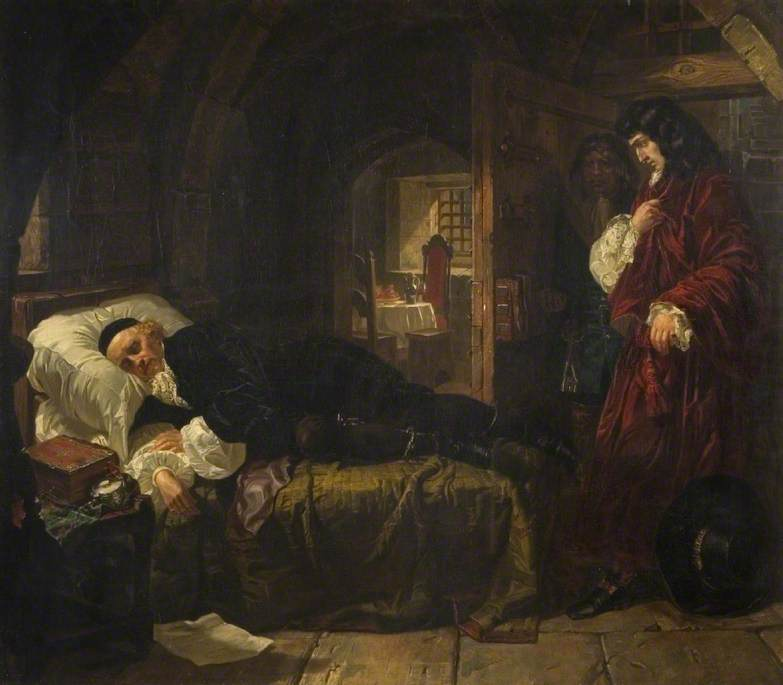
The Last Sleep of the Earl of Argyll by Edward Matthew Ward

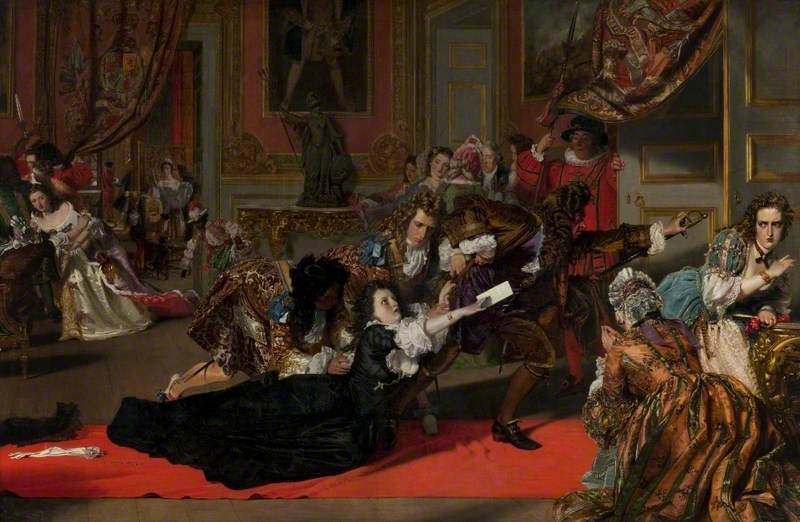
The Countess of Nithsdale Petitioning George I on Behalf of Her Husband by Robert Hannah

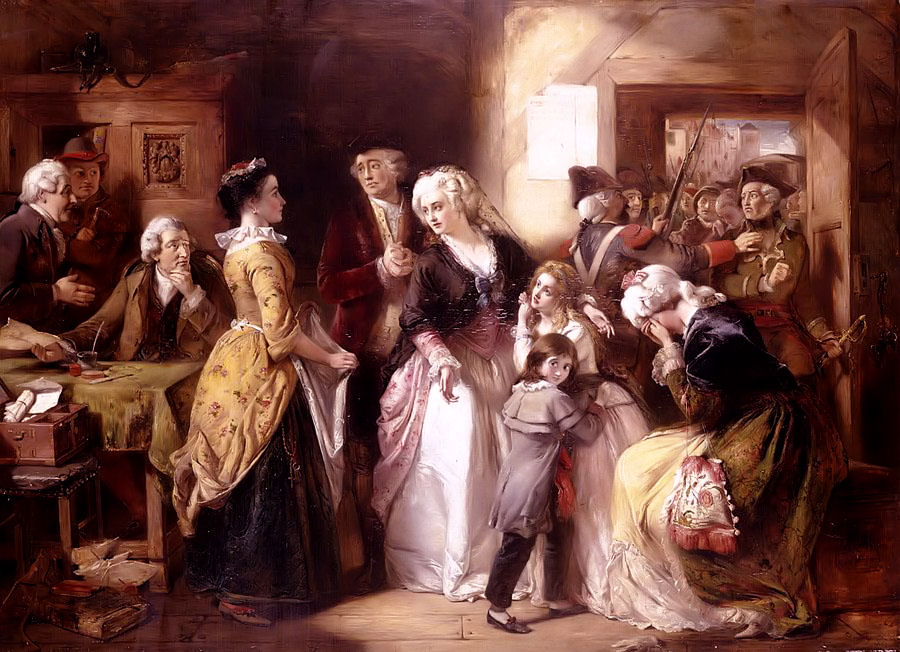
The Arrest of Louis XVI and His Family by Thomas Falcon Marshall

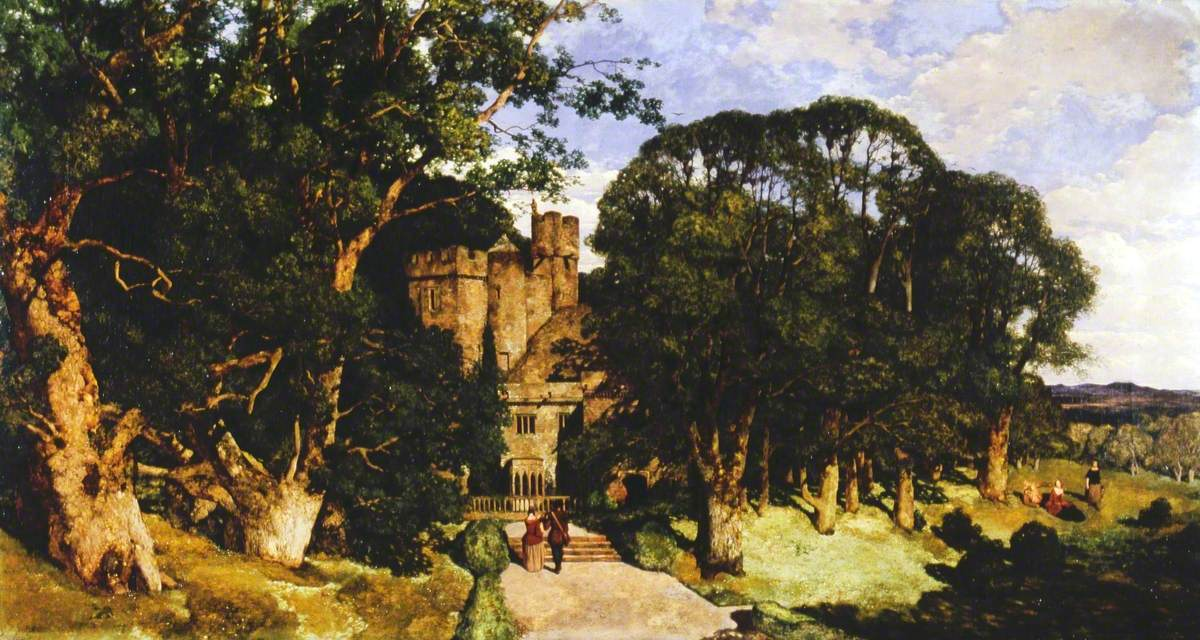
The Rookery by William James Blacklock

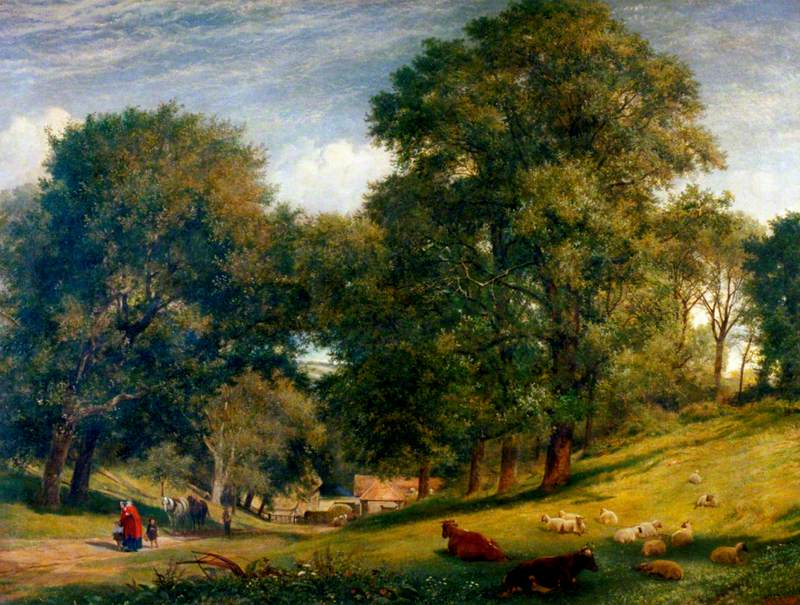
An Old English Homestead by Richard Redgrave

Expectation by Frederick Daniel Hardy

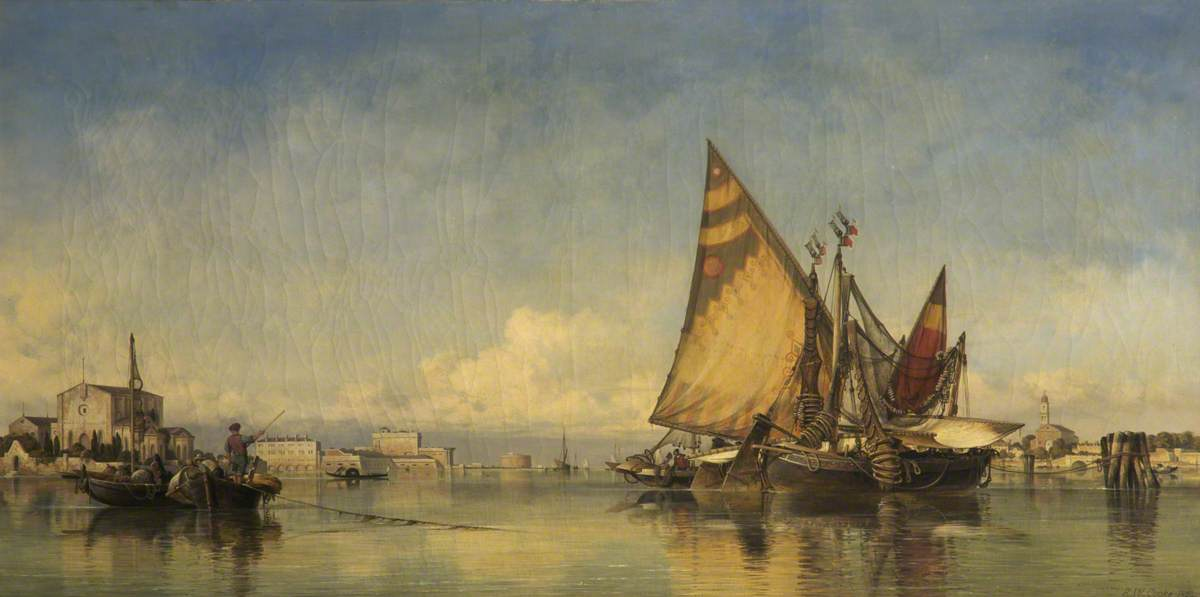
Porto Del Lido, Venice by Edward William Cooke

Zuyder Zee Botter, Returning to Port by Edward William Cooke

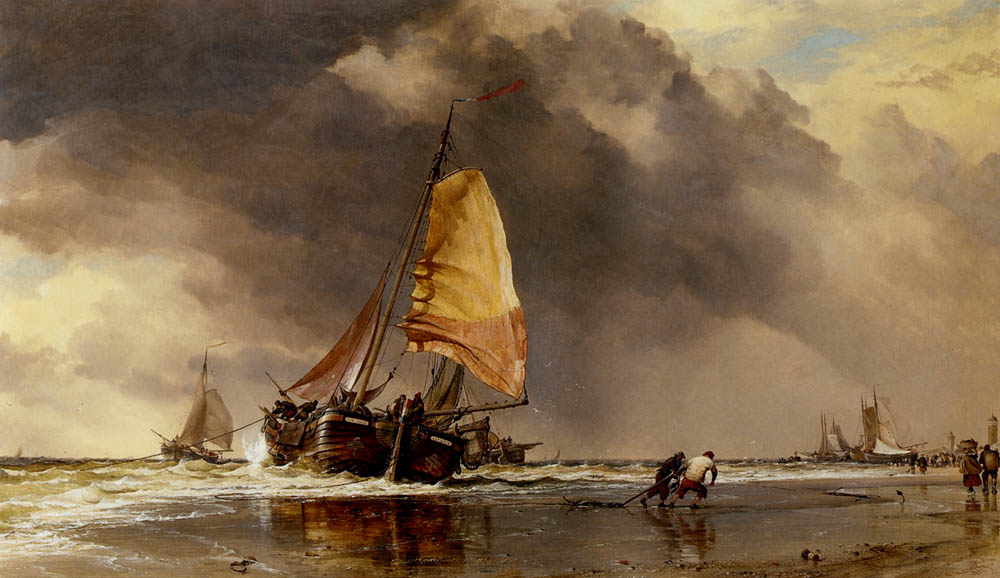
Dutch Fishing Pincks by Edward William Cooke

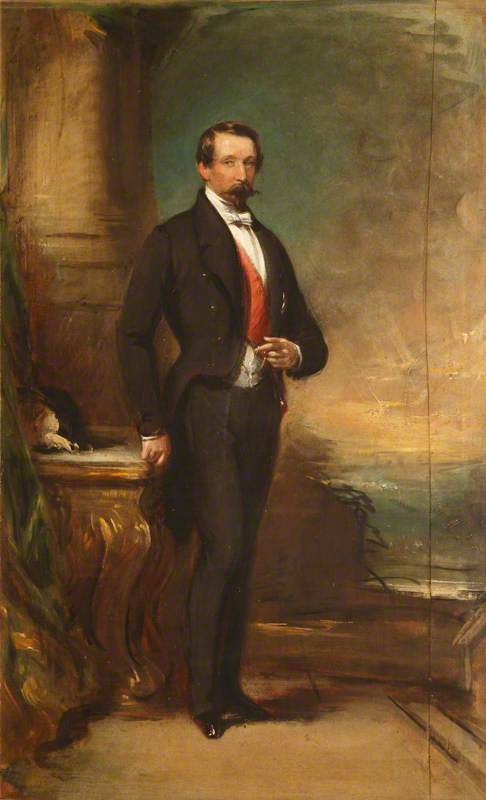
Portrait of Napoleon III by James Godsell Middleton

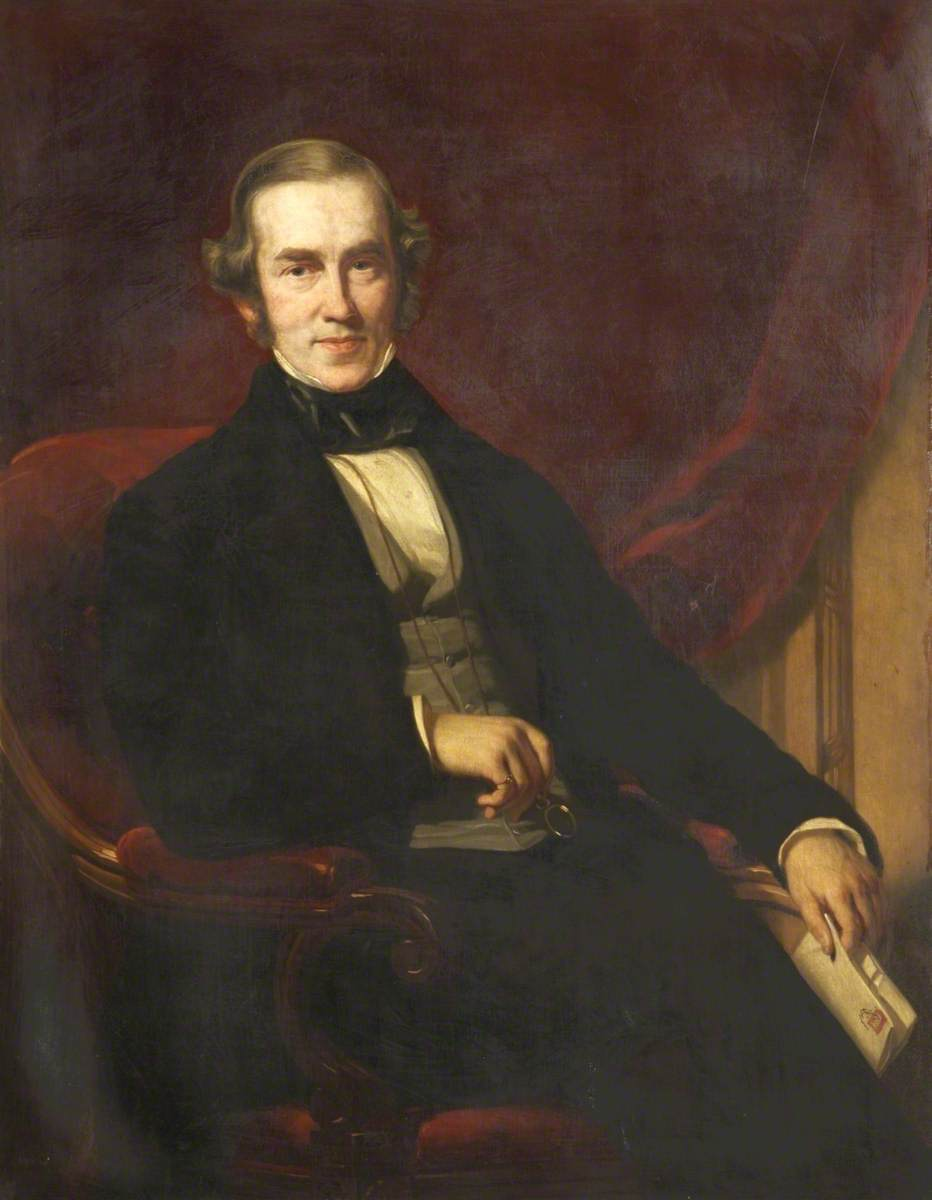
Portrait of Thomas Berry Horsfall by George Patten

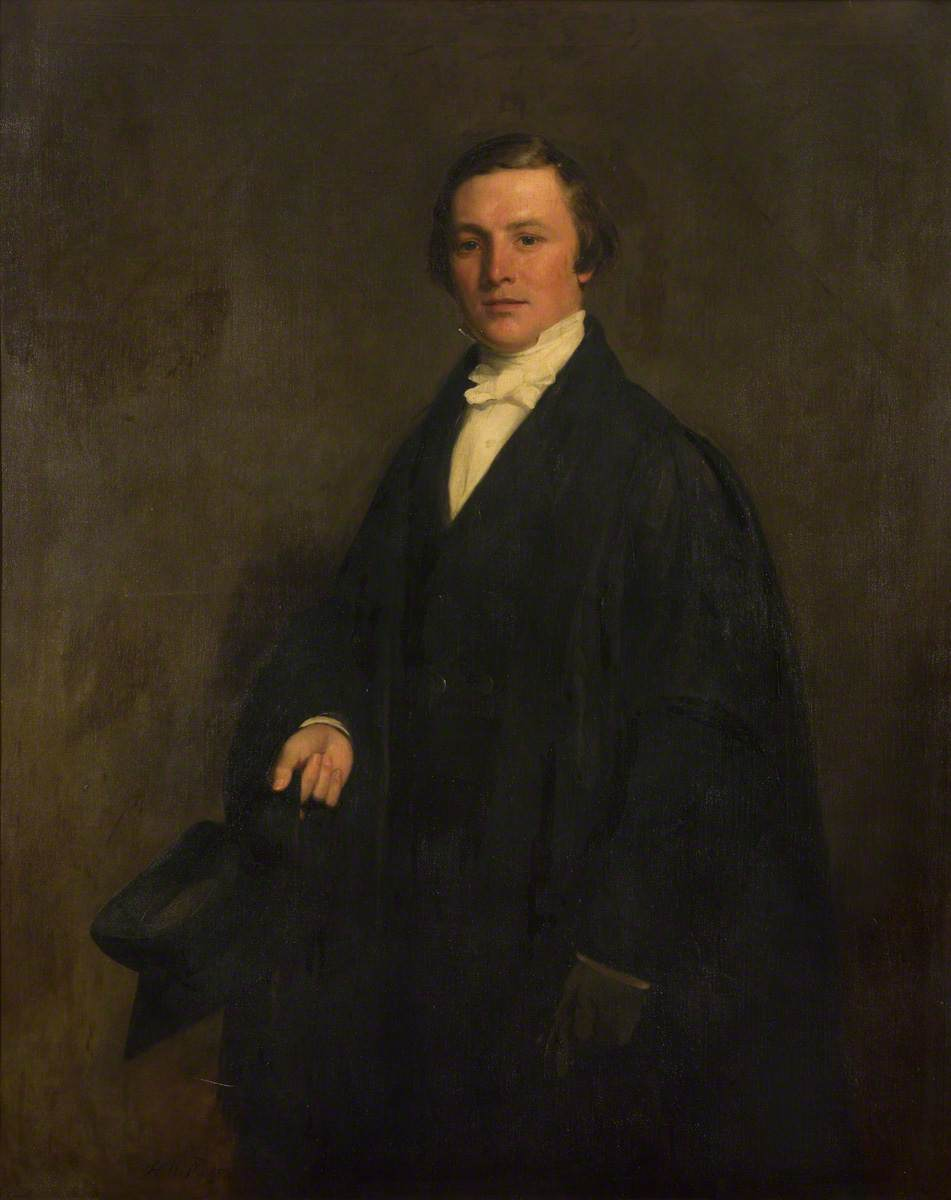
Portrait of Barnard Smith by Henry William Pickersgill

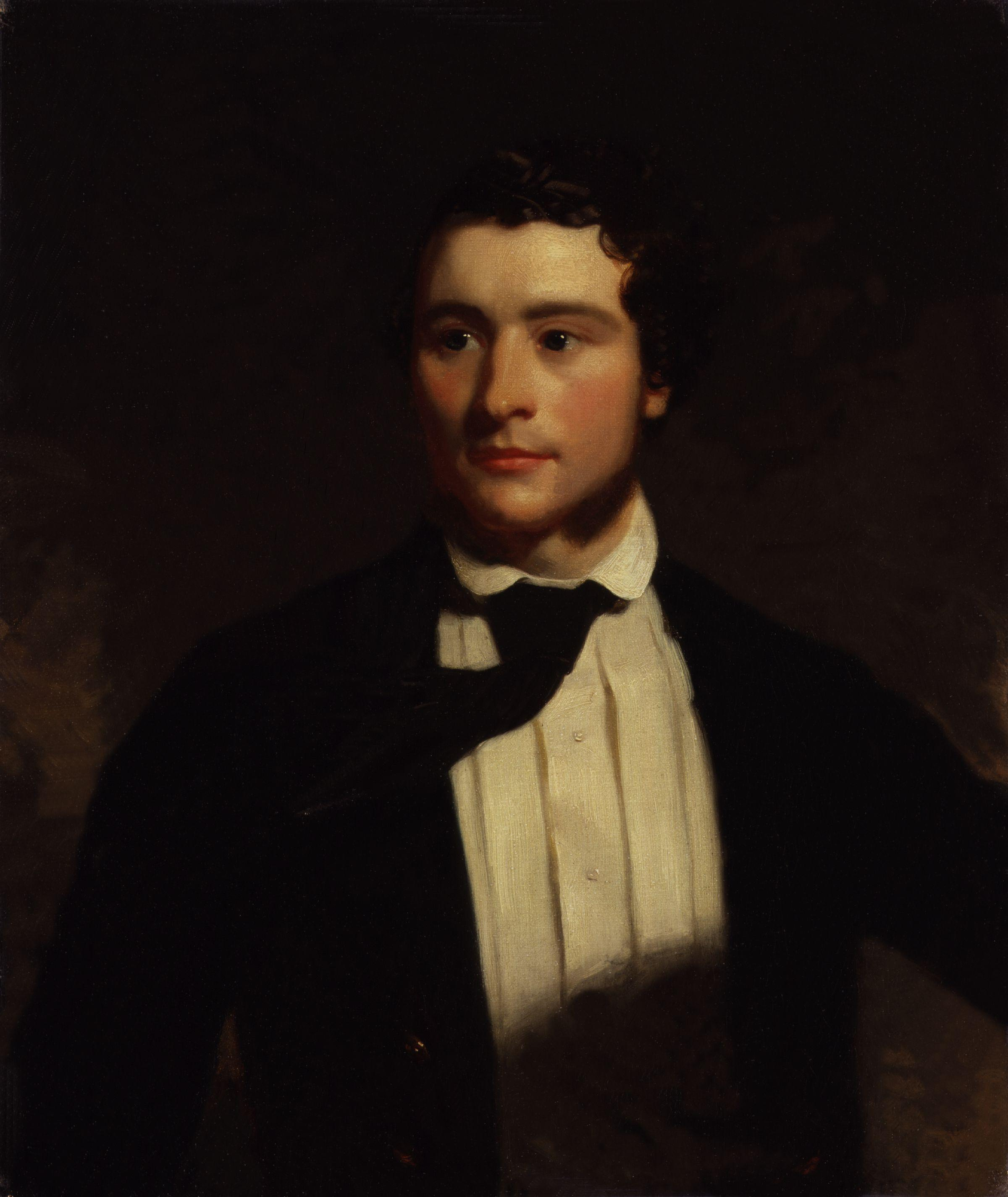
Portrait of Alexander Stewart by Stephen Pearce

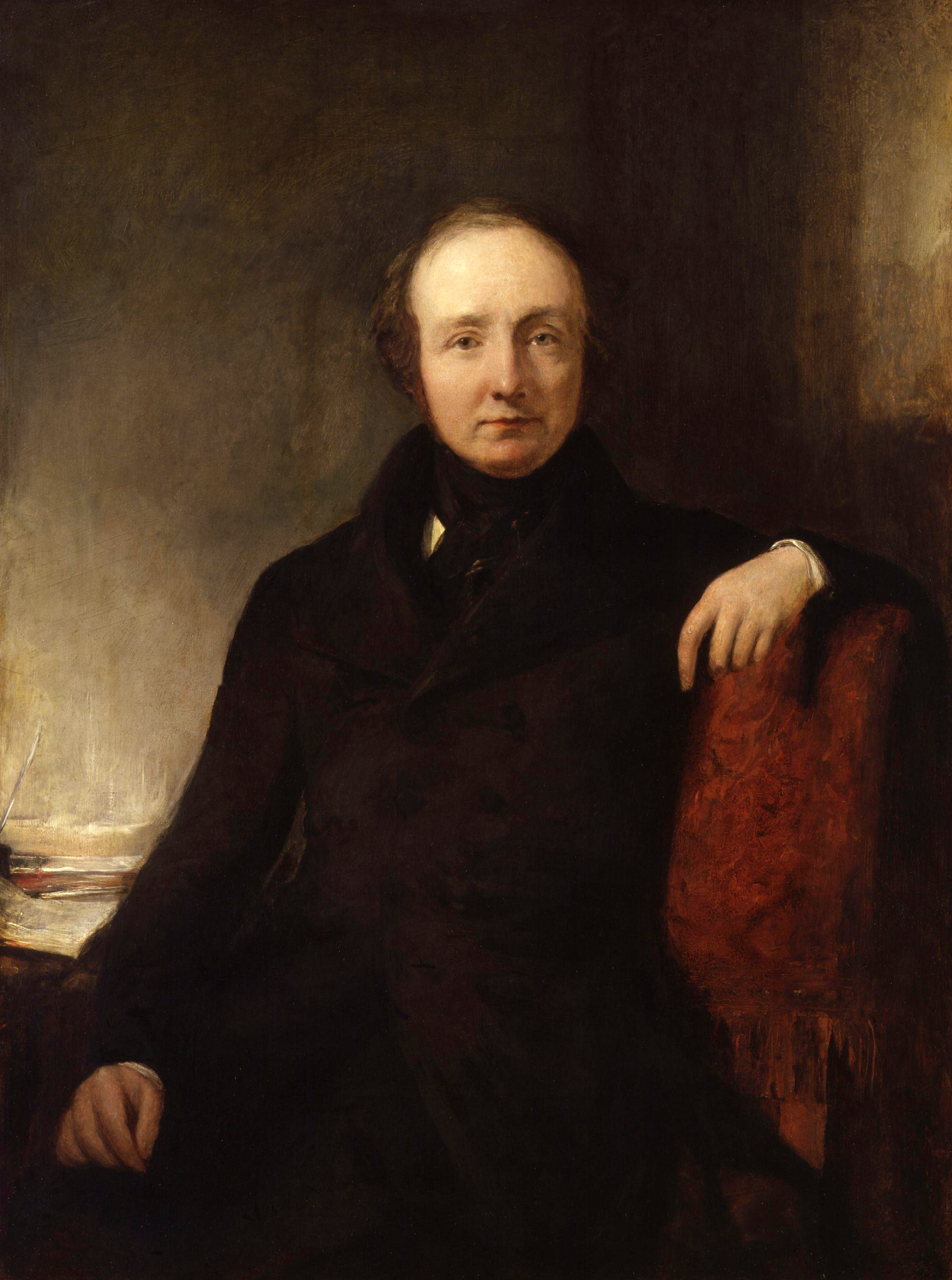
Portrait of Lewis Cubitt by William Boxall

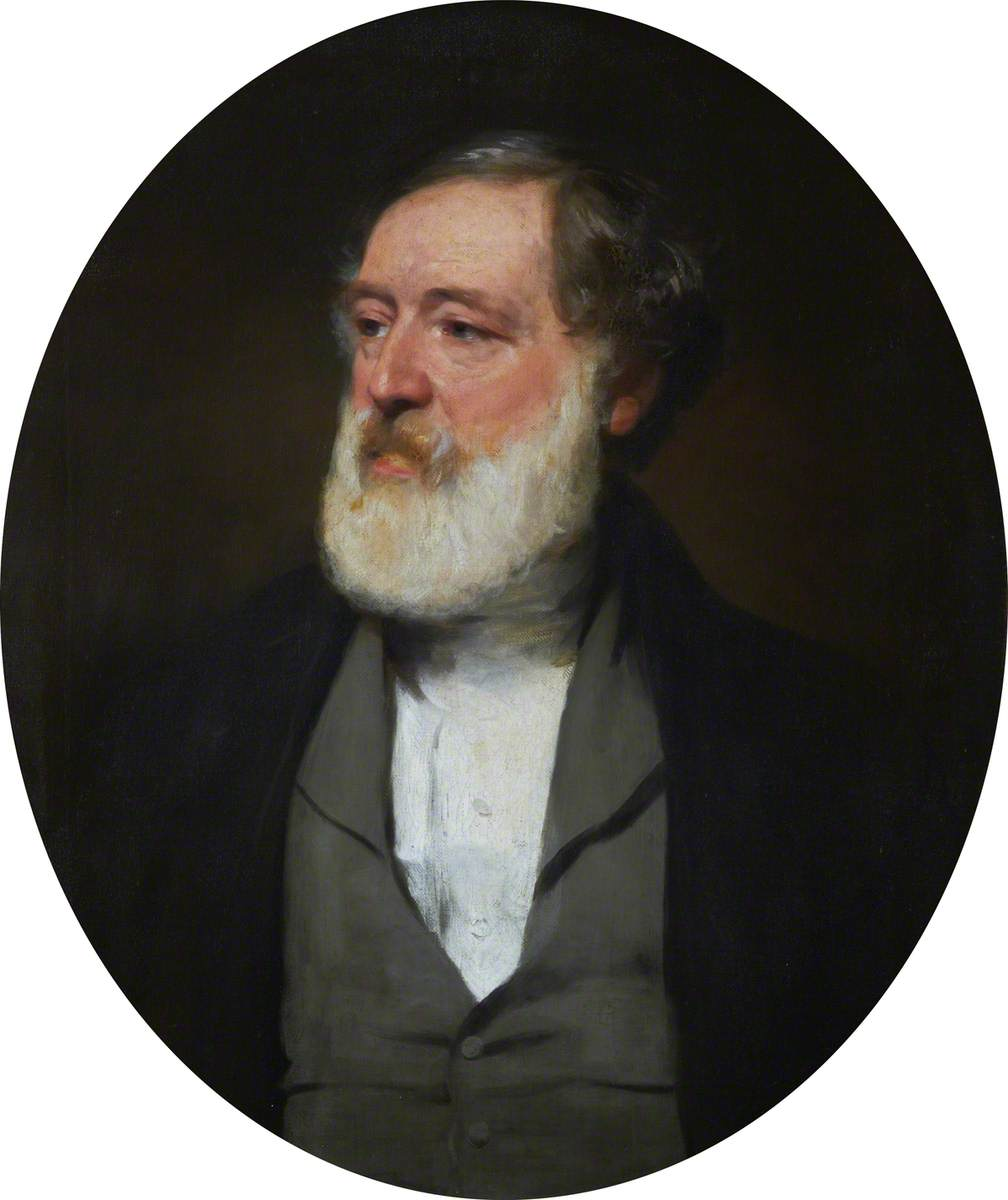
Portrait of John Frederick Lewis by John Frederick Lewis

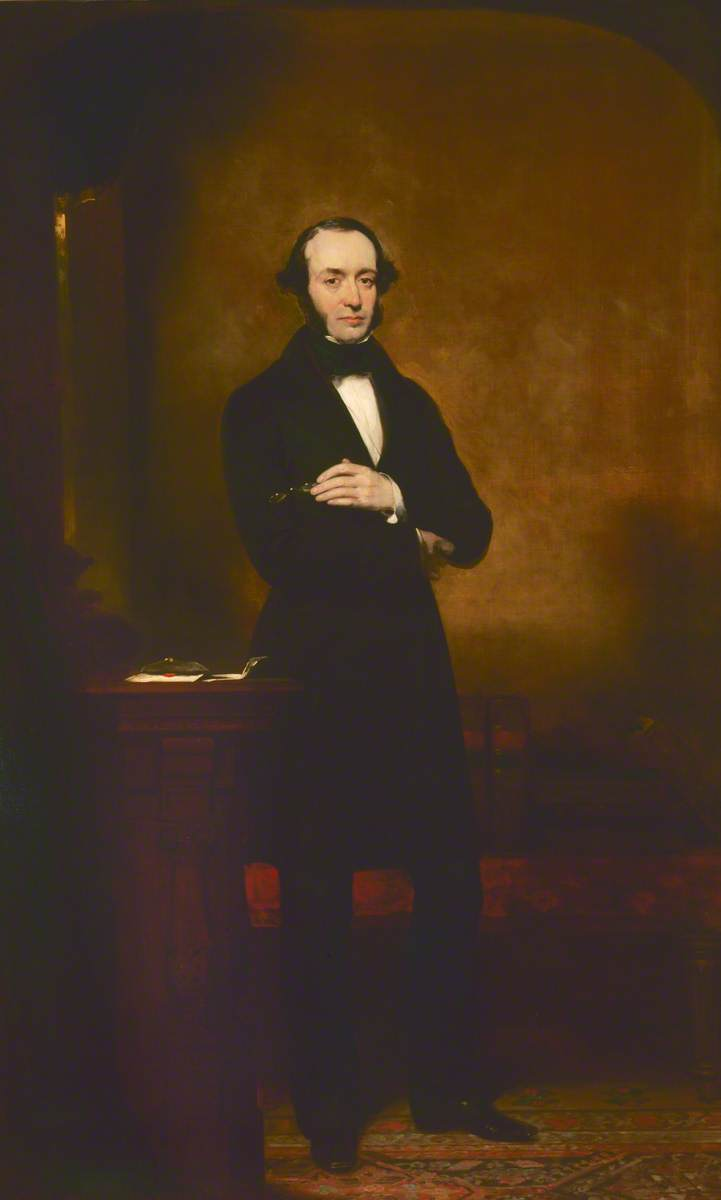
Portrait of John Inglis by John Watson Gordon

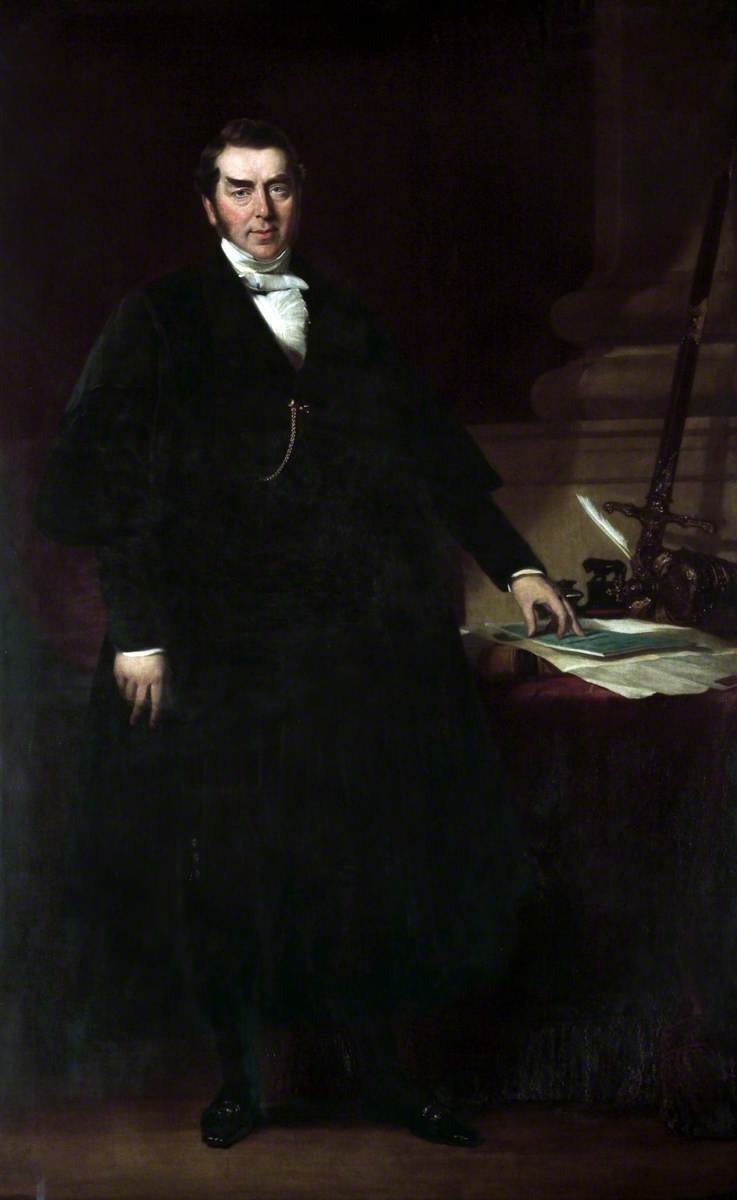
Portrait of Samuel Holme by George Patten

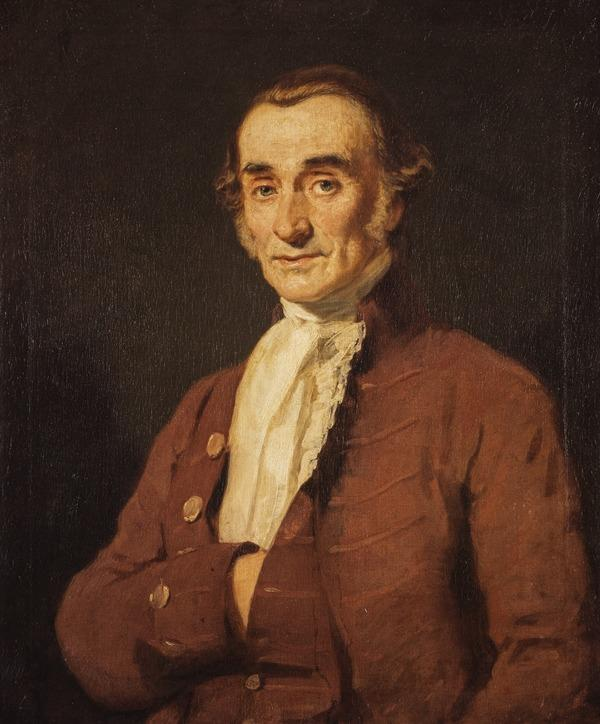
Portrait of Charles Mackay by Daniel Macnee

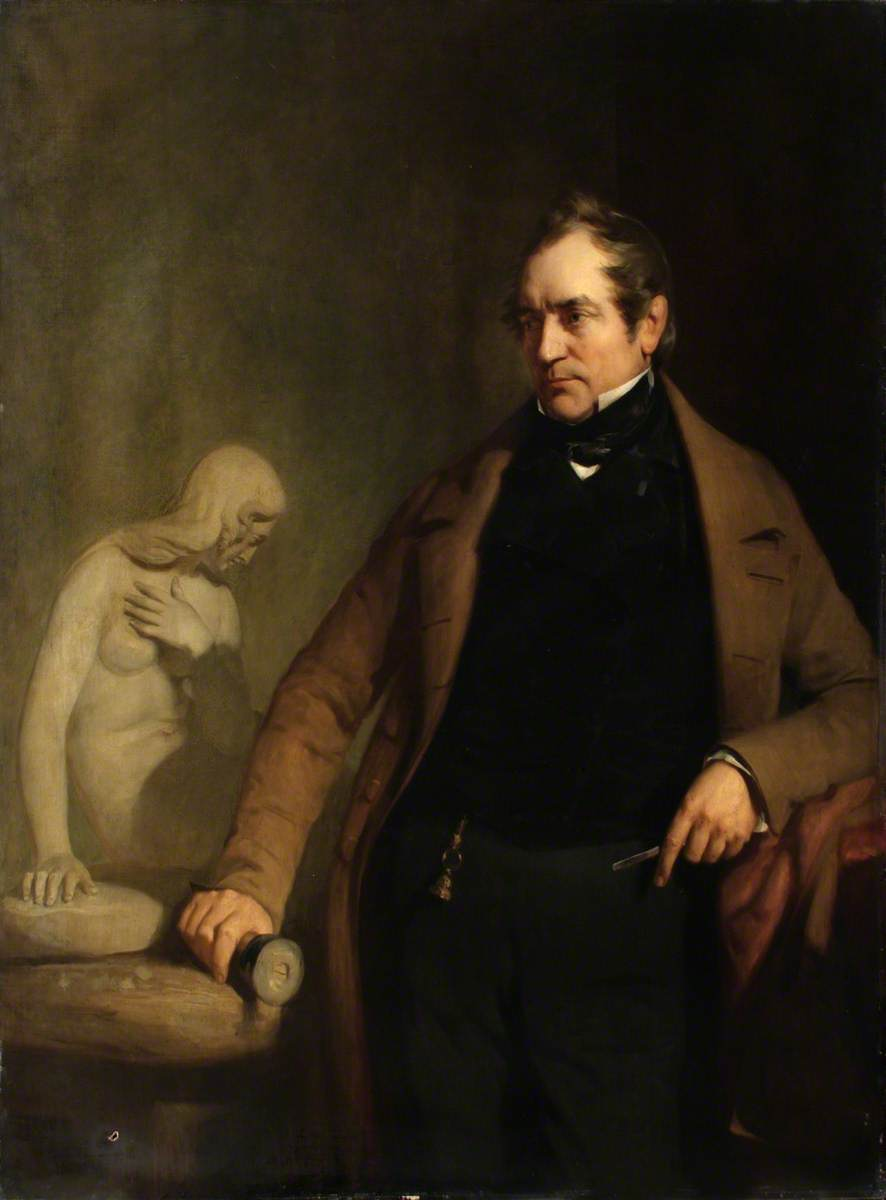
Portrait of Edward Hodges Baily by Thomas Mogford

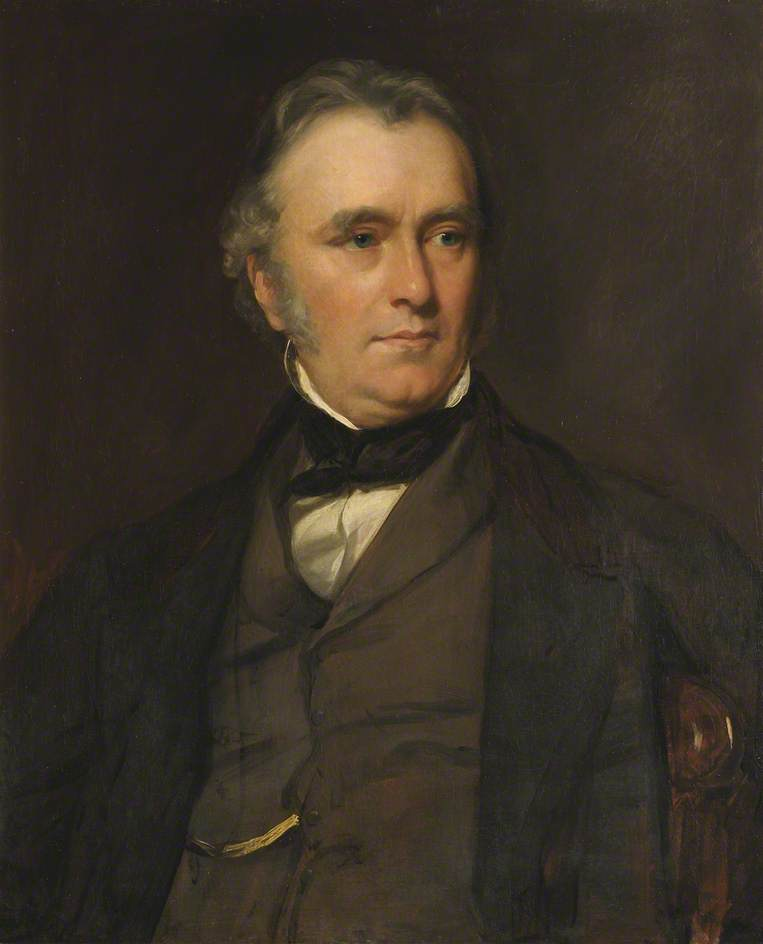
Portrait of Thomas Babington Macaulay by Francis Grant

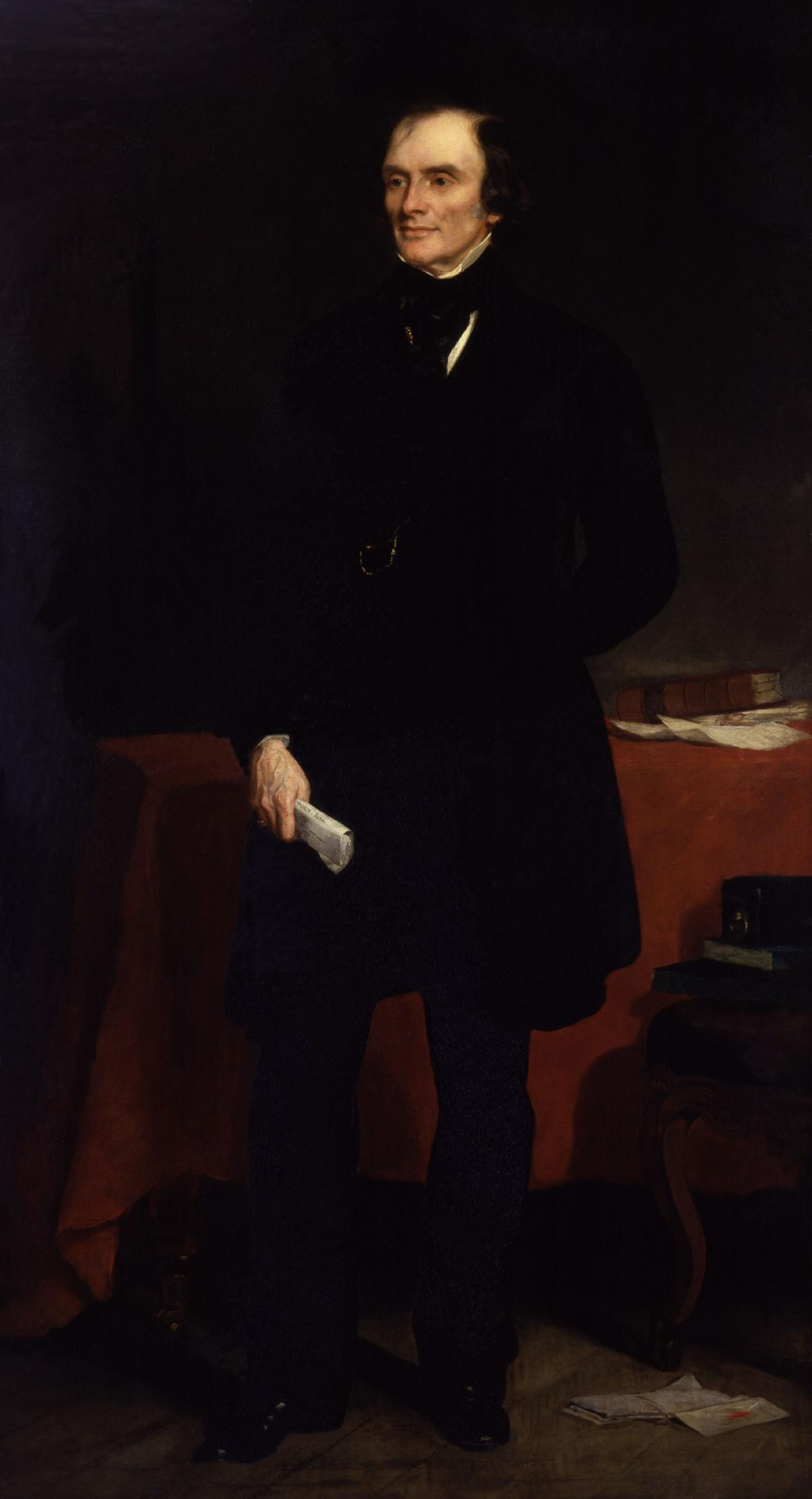
Portrait of Lord John Russell by Francis Grant

== See also ==
- Royal Academy Exhibition of 1853, the previous year's edition

== Bibliography ==
- Murray, Peter. Daniel Maclise, 1806-1870: Romancing the Past. Crawford Art Gallery, 2009.
- Van der Merwe, Pieter & Took, Roger. The Spectacular career of Clarkson Stanfield. Tyne and Wear County Council Museums, 1979.
