= The Last of the Crew =

Painting by Clarkson Stanfield

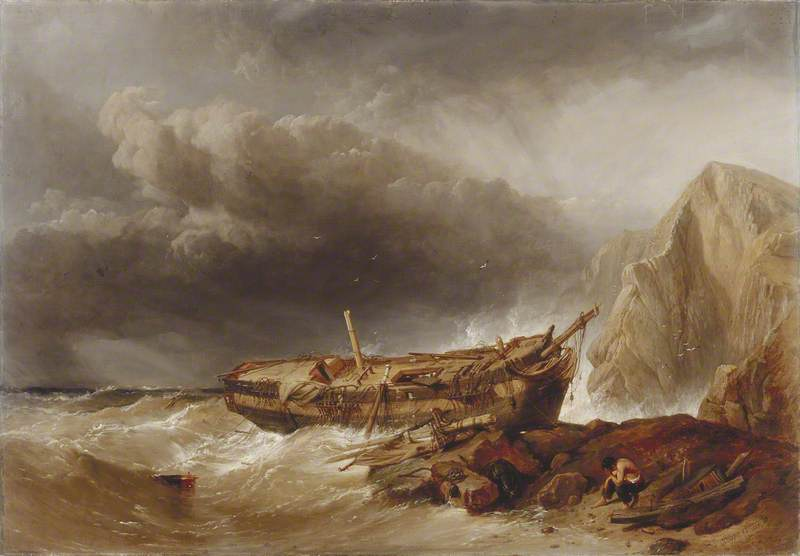
- Artist: Clarkson Stanfield
- Year: 1853
- Medium: Oil on canvas, landscape painting
- Dimensions: 83.5 cm × 121.5 cm (32.9 in × 47.8 in)
- Location: Manchester Art Gallery, Manchester

The Last of the Crew is an 1853 landscape painting by the British artist Clarkson Stanfield. It depicts the aftermaths of a shipwreck during a storm. The focus is on the sole survivor of the crew, alone on the rugged coastline.

Stanfield, a former sailor was noted for his romantic seascapes. The work was displayed at the Royal Academy's Summer Exhibition of 1854 at the National Gallery in London. The painting is now in the collection of the Manchester Art Gallery, having been acquired in 1920.

== Bibliography ==
- Bury, Stephen (ed.) Benezit Dictionary of British Graphic Artists and Illustrators, Volume 1. OUP, 2012.
- Munday, John. Edward William Cooke, 1811-1880 : a Man of His Time. Antique Collectors' Club, 1996.
- Van der Merwe, Pieter & Took, Roger. The Spectacular career of Clarkson Stanfield. Tyne and Wear County Council Museums, 1979.
