= Portrait of Thomas Babington Macaulay (Ward) =

Painting by Edward Matthew Ward

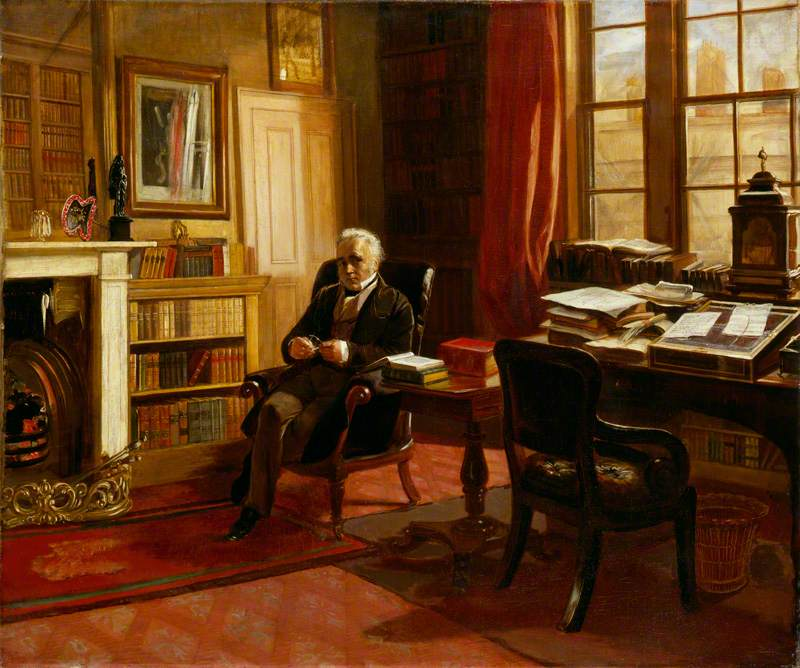
- Artist: Edward Matthew Ward
- Year: 1853
- Type: Oil on canvas, portrait painting
- Dimensions: 63.5 cm × 76.2 cm (25.0 in × 30.0 in)
- Location: National Portrait Gallery, London

Portrait of Thomas Babington Macaulay is an oil on canvas portrait painting by the British artist Edward Matthew Ward, from 1853. The painting is at the National Portrait Gallery, in London, having been acquired in 1972.

== History and description ==
It depicts the politician and writer Thomas Babington Macaulay, who is shown seated in his study at The Albany in Piccadilly. Macaulay found the sittings for the picture tedious. He was working on his magnum opus The History of England. It was one of a series of seven paintings Ward produced showing famous writers in their studies.

Francis Grant produced a different Portrait of Thomas Babington Macaulay the same year which was displayed at the Royal Academy Exhibition of 1853 and is now at Trinity College in Cambridge.

== Bibliography ==
- Funnell, Peter. Victorian Portraits in the National Portrait Gallery Collection. National Portrait Gallery, 1996.
- Ormond, Richard. National Portrait Gallery in Colour. Studio Vista, 1979.
