= Portrait of Hope Grant =

Painting by Francis Grant

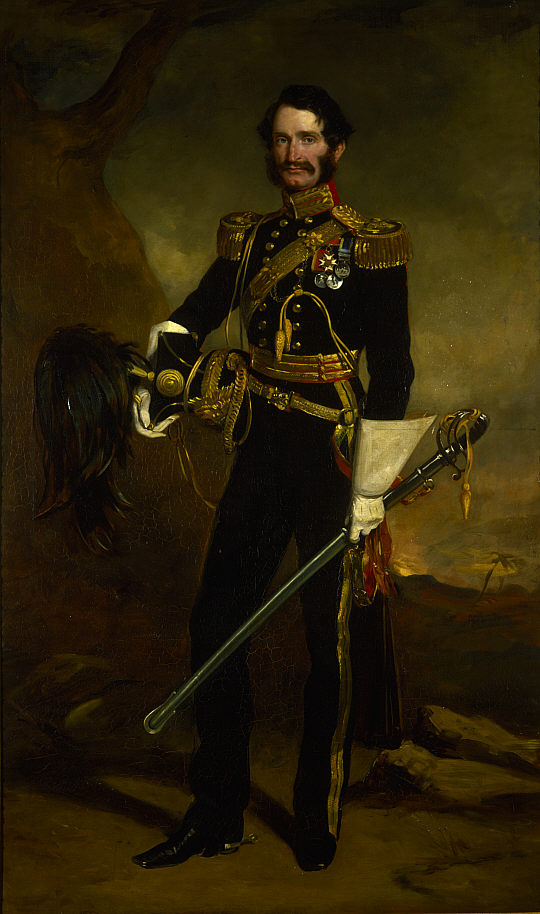
- Artist: Francis Grant
- Year: 1853
- Type: Oil on canvas, portrait painting
- Dimensions: 233.4 cm × 132.1 cm (91.9 in × 52.0 in)
- Location: Scottish National Portrait Gallery, Edinburgh

Portrait of Hope Grant is an oil on canvas portrait painting by the British artist Francis Grant, from 1853. It depicts his younger brother, the British Army officer Hope Grant.

The sitter is shown as a Lieutenant Colonel in the uniform of the Ninth Lancers, wearing the Companion of the Order of the Bath and three campaign medals. The backdrop reflects his extended service in India. The brothers continued to rise in their different careers. Francis went on to become President of the Royal Academy while Hope Grant led the expedition to Peking during the Second Opium War.

The work was displayed at the Royal Academy Exhibition of 1854 at the National Gallery in London. The painting is now in the collection of the Scottish National Portrait Gallery in Edinburgh, having been acquired in 1892. Francis painted his brother several times, a later work shows him posing with a cello, a musical instrument he was notably skilled at.
