= The Room in Which Shakespeare Was Born =

Painting by Henry Wallis

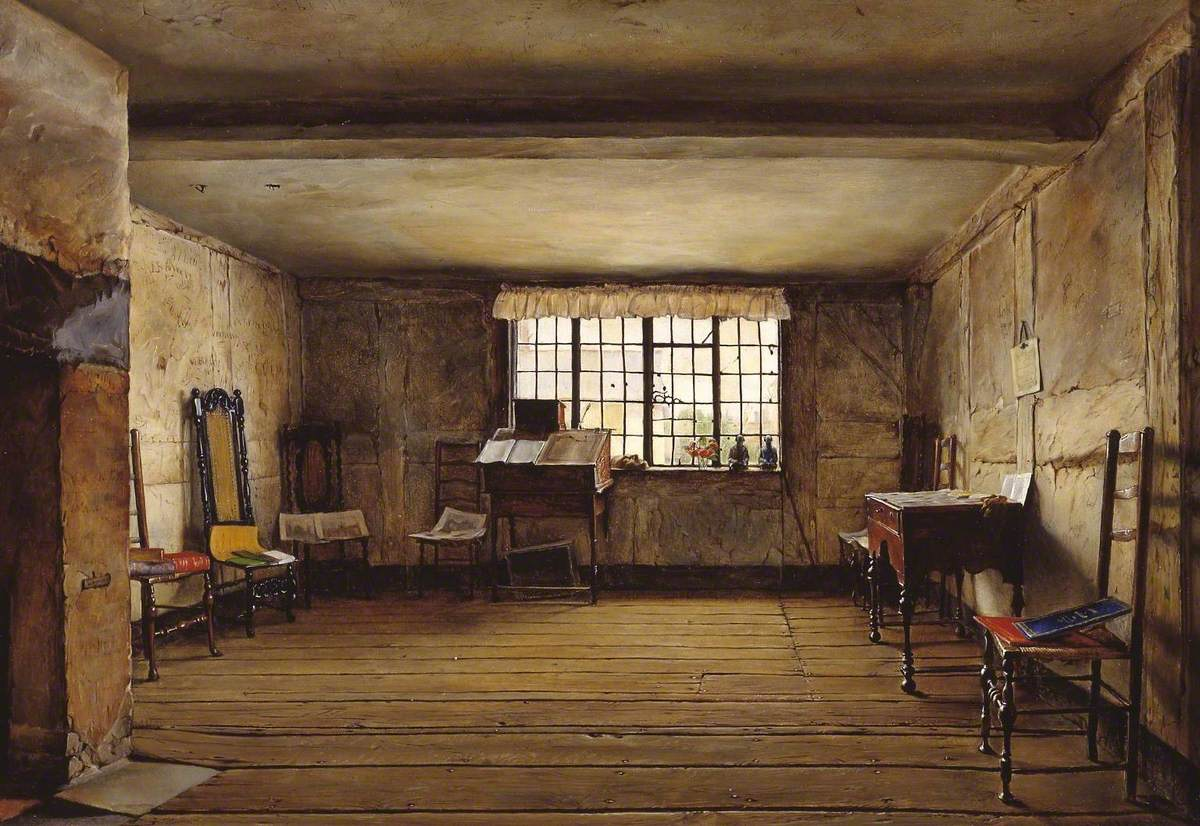
- Artist: Henry Wallis
- Year: 1853
- Type: Oil on canvas
- Dimensions: 41.9 cm × 29.2 cm (16.5 in × 11.5 in)
- Location: Tate Britain, London

The Room in Which Shakespeare Was Born is an 1853 oil painting by the British artist Henry Wallis. It depicts the room in Shakespeare's Birthplace in Stratford-Upon-Avon in Warwickshire as it looked in the mid-Victorian era. Wallis was a member of the Pre-Raphaelite movement. The work was displayed at the Royal Academy Exhibition of 1854 at the National Gallery. Today the painting is in the collection of the Tate Britain in London, having been acquired in 1955.

== Bibliography ==
- Conrad, Peter. The Victorian Treasure-house. Collins, 1973.
- Østermark-Johansen, Lene. Walter Pater's European Imagination. Oxford University Press, 2022.
- Upstone, Robert. The Pre-Raphaelite Dream: Paintings & Drawings from the Tate Collection. Harry N. Abrams, 2003.
