= The Execution of the Marquis of Montrose =

Painting by Edward Matthew Ward

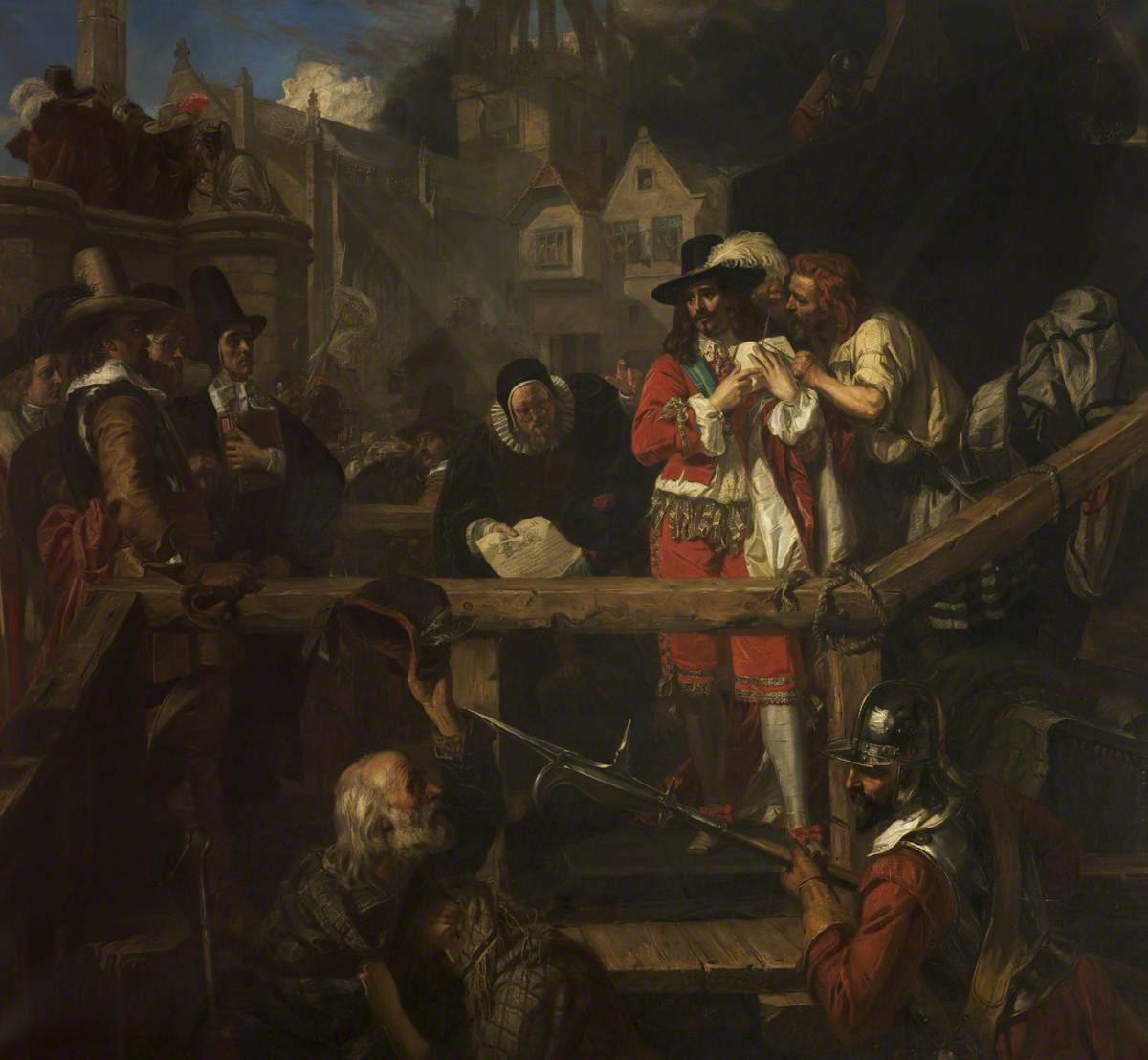
- Artist: Edward Matthew Ward
- Year: 1853
- Type: Oil on canvas, history painting
- Dimensions: 201 cm × 231 cm (79 in × 91 in)
- Location: Salford Museum and Art Gallery, Greater Manchester

The Execution of the Marquis of Montrose is an 1853 history painting by the British artist Edward Matthew Ward depicting a scene from the Wars of the Three Kingdoms. On 21 May 1650 the Scottish Royalist leader James Graham, Marquess of Montrose was executed by the Mercat Cross in Edinburgh. He is shown standing on the scaffold before he was hanged by his Covenanter opponents.

Following the Burning of Parliament in 1834, the Houses of Parliament were rebuilt and decorated with scenes from British history. As part of this Ward produced this and The Last Sleep of the Earl of Argyll an equivalent scene from 1685 of the Earl of Argyll before his own execution for leading a failed uprising. Produced in consultation with Thomas Babington Macaulay, the aim was to provide a balance to the two competing sides of the seventeenth century. However the original pictures were too large to hang in their intended location in the corridors of the House of Commons and were instead reproduced as frescos. The painting was displayed at the Royal Academy Exhibition of 1853 held at the National Gallery in London. It is now in the collection of Salford Museum and Art Gallery, having been acquired in 1877.

== Bibliography ==
- Dafforne, James. The Life and Works of Edward Matthew Ward. Virtue and Company, 1879.
- Morris, Edward. Public Art Collections in North-west England: A History and Guide. Liverpool University Press, 2001.
