= Portrait of Thomas Babington Macaulay (Grant) =

Painting by Francis Grant

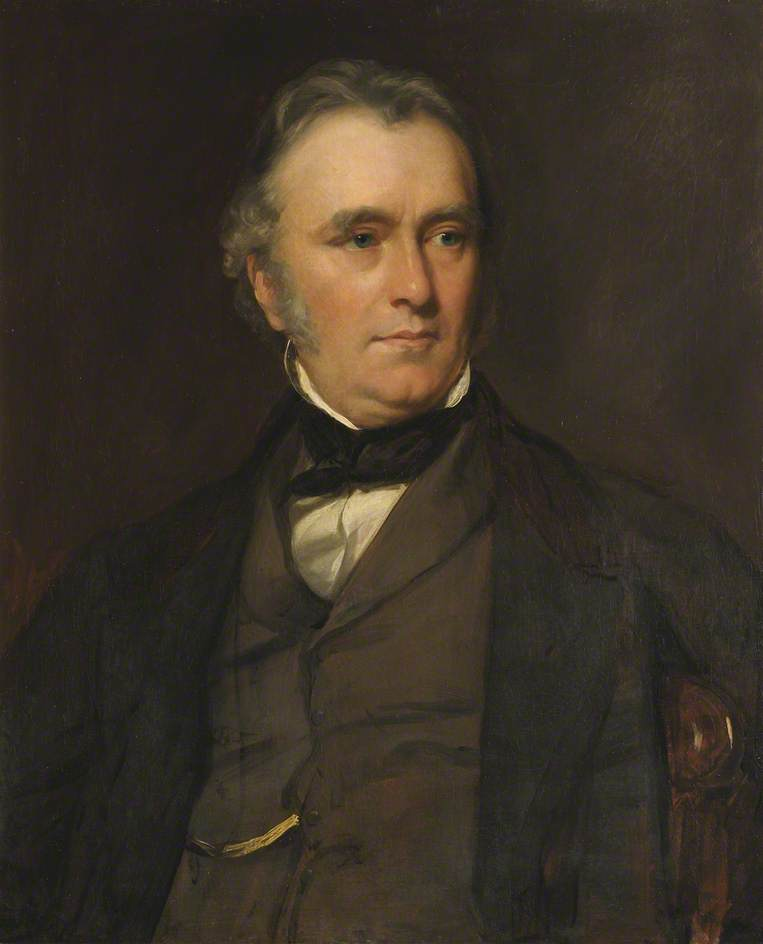
- Artist: Francis Grant
- Year: 1853
- Type: Oil on canvas, portrait painting
- Dimensions: 75 cm × 62 cm (30 in × 24 in)
- Location: Trinity College, Cambridge

Portrait of Thomas Babington Macaulay is an 1853 portrait painting by the British artist Francis Grant. It depicts the politician and author Thomas Babington Macaulay, known for his The History of England from the Accession of James the Second influential in the development of Whig history. Grant was a leading portraitist of the early Victorian era and went on to be elected President of the Royal Academy.

It was commissioned to hang at Trinity College at Cambridge University. It was displayed at the Royal Academy Exhibition of 1854 held at the National Gallery and again at the 1868 Exhibition of National Portraits at the South Kensington Museum. An oil sketch made in preparation for the painting was acquired by the National Portrait Gallery in 1877, with Grant himself noting "I always thought this small picture the best likeness of the two".

== Bibliography ==
- Ormond, Richard. Early Victorian Portraits, National Portrait Gallery, 1974.
- Wills, Catherine. High Society: The Life and Art of Sir Francis Grant, 1803–1878. National Galleries of Scotland, 2003.
