= Lectionary 241 =

Greek manuscript

Lectionary ℓ 240
- New Testament manuscript
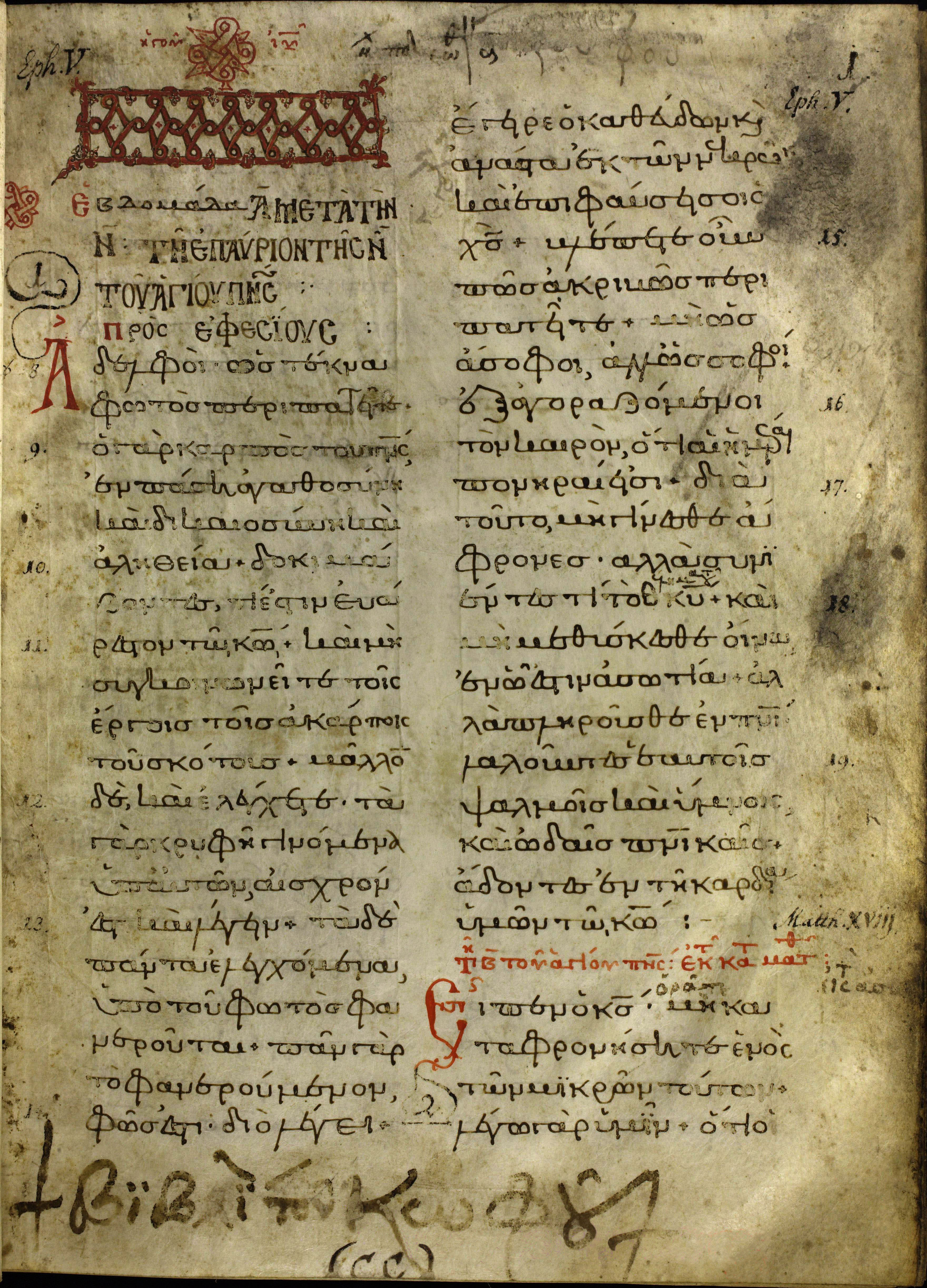
- Folio 1 recto
- Text: Evangelistarium, Apostolarium
- Date: 1199
- Script: Greek
- Now at: Glasgow University Library
- Size: 27.3 cm by 21 cm
- Type: Byzantine/mixed

Lectionary 241, designated by siglum ℓ 241 (in the Gregory-Aland numbering) is a Greek manuscript of the New Testament, on parchment. It is dated by a Colophon to the year 1199. Scrivener labelled it as 232^{evl}. The manuscript is lacunose.

== Description ==
The codex contains lessons from the Gospels of Matthew, Luke lectionary (Evangelistarium), and Epistles (Apostolarium), with some lacunae.

The text is written in Greek minuscule letters, on 176 parchment leaves (27.3 cm by 21 cm), in two columns per page, 26 lines per page. 8 leaves per quire.

The initial A and initial E are rubricated. Lessons are numbered by modern hand (de Missy?). There is no marginalia (with the exception of the numbering of the Lessons, 1–350, and citation of the chapters and verses by the paginator. The nomina sacra are written in an abbreviated way, verses are separated by "+", the errors of itacism occur. There are some marginal notes.

== Textual variants ==
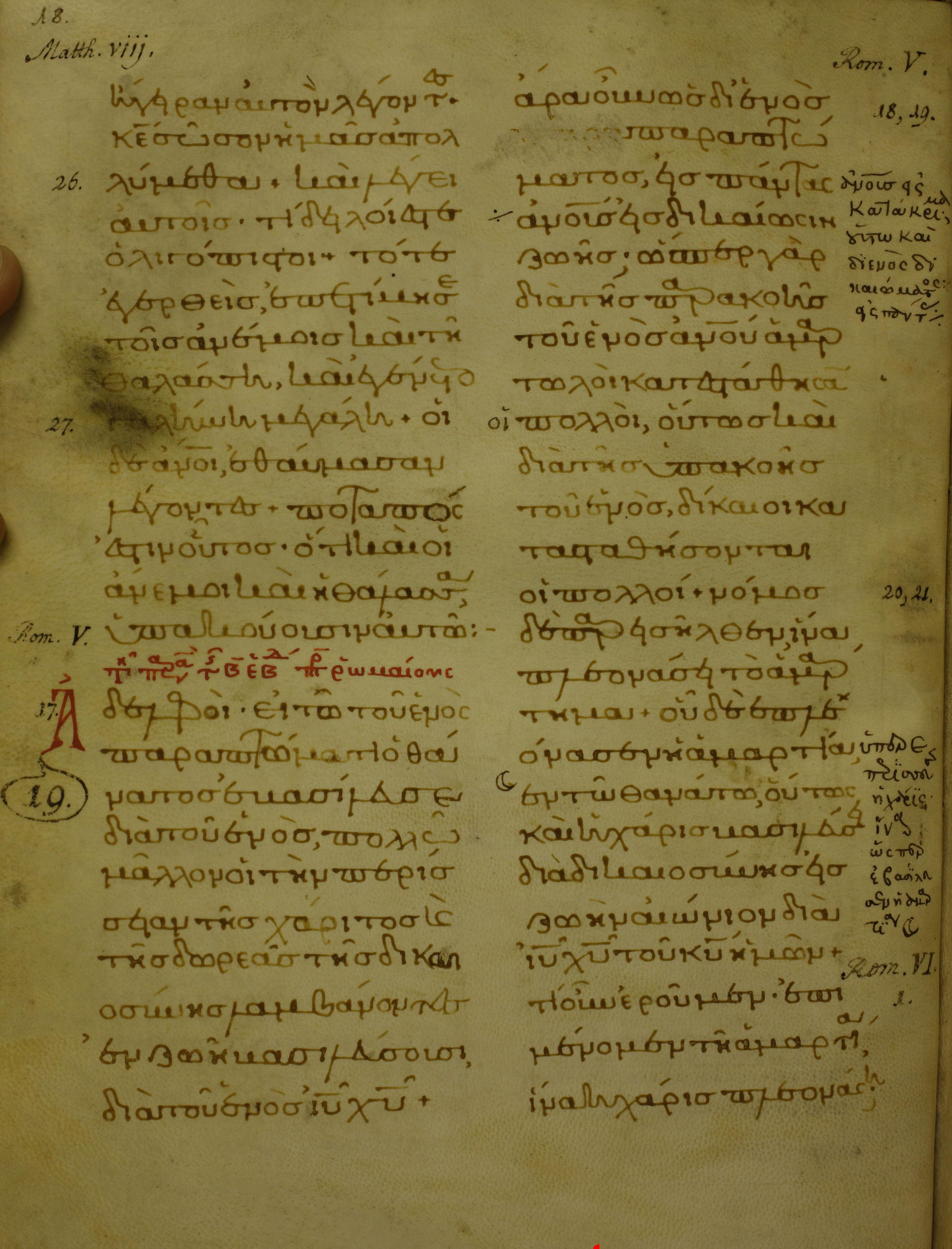
Folio 9 verso with text of Matthew 8:25-57 and Romans 5; there are marginal notes

The word before the bracket is the reading of the UBS edition, the word after the bracket is the reading of the manuscript. The reading of Textus Receptus in bold.

Matthew 11:2 – Χριστου ] Ιησου (supported by Codex Bezae, 0233, 1424 and other)
Matthew 11:7 – εξηλθατε ] εξηλθετε
Matthew 11:8 – omit ] ιματιοις
Matthew 11:13 – επροφητευσαν ] προεφητευσαν
Matthew 11:15 – omit ] ακουειν
Matthew 11:16 – δε ] omit
Matthew 11:16 – καθεμενοις ] καθεζομενοις
Matthew 11:16 – ετεροις ] ετεροις (TR reads: εταιροις)
Matthew 11:18 – omit ] προς υμας (supported by Codex Koridethi, f^{13}, Syriac Curetonian, Syriac Harkleian)
Matthew 11:19 – των εργων ] των τεκνων
Romans 10:11 – επ αυτω ] επ αυτω Θεω
Romans 10:12 – τους επικαλουμενους ] τοις επικαλουμενοις
Romans 10:14 – επικαλεσωνται ] επικαλεσονται

== History ==
It is assigned by the INTF to the 12th century. According to the colophon on the last leaf it was written in the month of August, in the year 6707 (from the creation of the world), in the reign of Alexius Commenus III Angelus.

The manuscript once belonged to Caesar de Missy, chaplain to George III, in 1748 (along with the codices 560, 561, ℓ 162, ℓ 239, ℓ 240). Then it belonged to William Hunter. The Hunter's collection remained in London for several years after his death – for the use of his nephew, Matthew Baillie (1761-1823) – and finally came to the Glasgow University in 1807.

The manuscript was added to the list of New Testament manuscripts by Scrivener (number 232) and Gregory (number 241). Gregory saw it in 1883.

The manuscript is sporadically cited in the critical editions of the Greek New Testament (UBS3).

The codex is housed at the Glasgow University Library, as a part of the Hunterian Collection (Ms. Hunter 419) in Glasgow.

== See also ==
- List of New Testament lectionaries
- Biblical manuscript
- Textual criticism

== Bibliography ==
- John Young & P. H. Aitken, A catalogue of the manuscripts in the Library of the Hunterian Museum in the University of Glasgow (Glasgow, 1908), pp. 343–344
- Ian C. Cunningham, Greek Manuscripts in Scotland: summary catalogue, with addendum (Edinburgh, 1982), no. 55
