= Lectionary 240 =

Lectionary ℓ 240
- New Testament manuscript
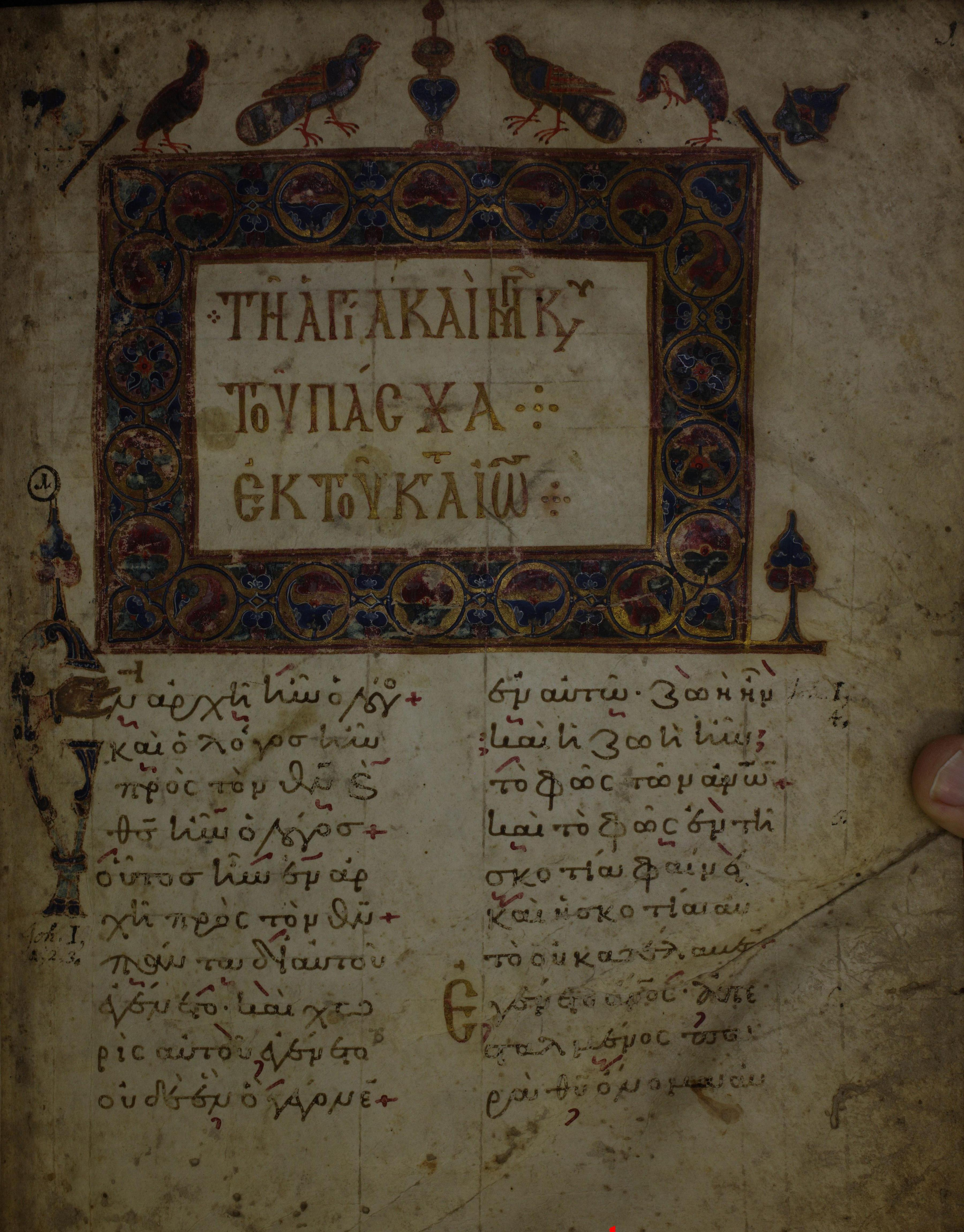
- folio 1 recto with text of John 1:1-6, decorated headpiece
- Text: Evangelistarium
- Date: 12th century
- Script: Greek
- Now at: Glasgow University Library
- Size: 28 cm by 21 cm

Lectionary 240, designated by siglum ℓ 240 (in the Gregory-Aland numbering) is a Greek manuscript of the New Testament, on parchment. Palaeographically it has been assigned to the 12th century. Scrivener labelled it by 231^{evl}. The manuscript has complex contents.

== Description ==
The codex contains 237 daily lessons for reading from Easter to Pentecost from the Gospels of John, Matthew, Luke lectionary (Evangelistarium). The manuscript is well preserved.

The text is written in Greek minuscule letters, on 251 parchment leaves (28 cm by 21 cm), in two columns per page, 22-25 lines per page. The headpieces are decorated with gold; the punctuation and accents added later in red. It uses breathings and accents, punctuation, interrogative sign (in red); ιt contains some notes made by several later hands.

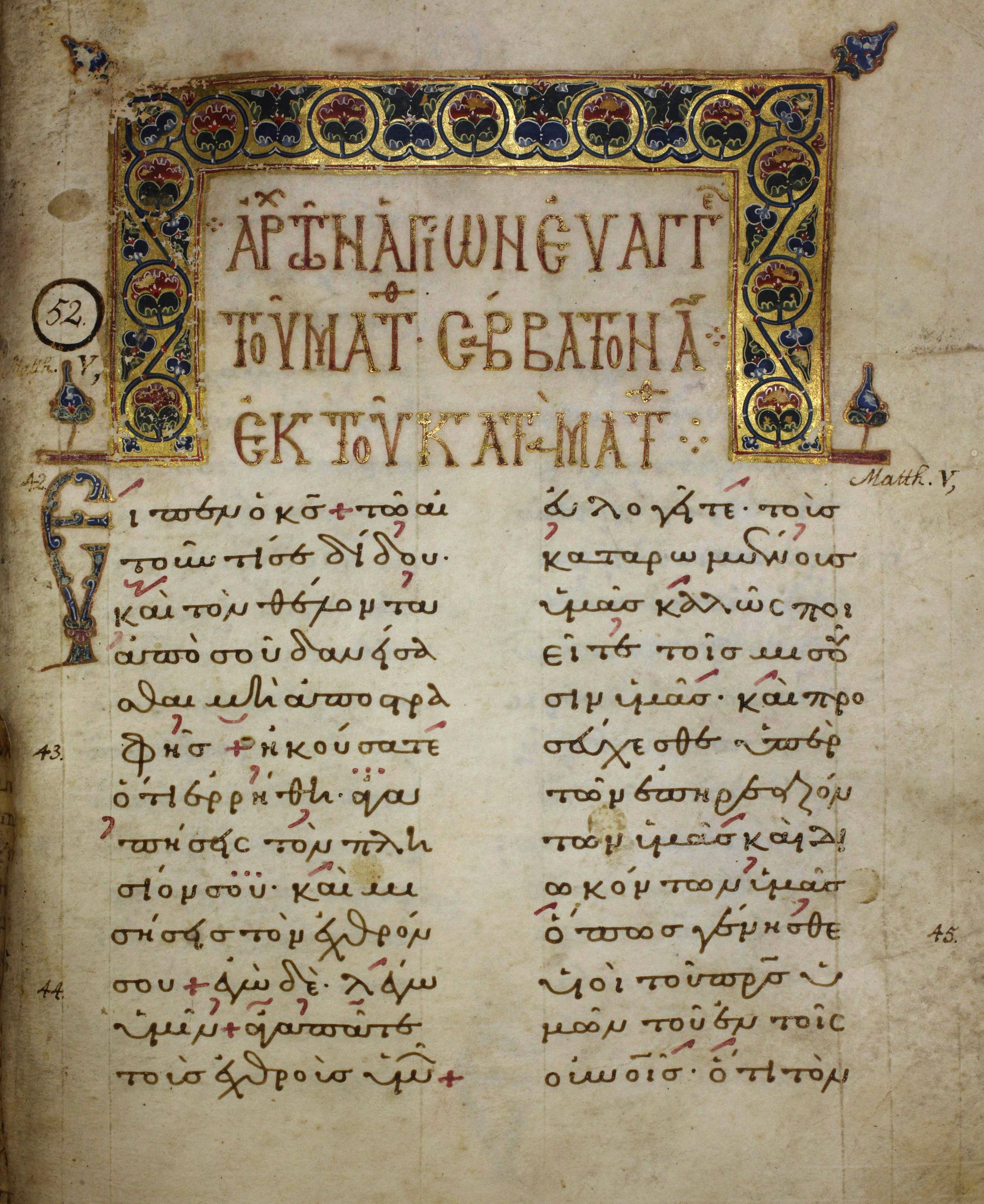
Folio 51 recto with text of Matthew 5:42-45, the decorated headpiece

Textual variants

The word before the bracket is the reading of the UBS edition, the word after the bracket is the reading of the manuscript. The reading of Textus Receptus in bold.

Matthew 5:42 – δος ] διδου
Matthew 5:44 – και προσευχεσθε υπερ των διωκοντων υμας ] ευλογειτε τους καταρομενους υμας καλως ποιειτε τοις μισουσιν υμας και προσευχεσθε υπερ των επηρεαζοντων υμας και διωκοντων υμας (TR reads: ευλογειτε τους καταρομενους υμας καλως ποιειτε τους μισουντας υμας και προσευχεσθε υπερ των επηρεαζοντων υμας και διωκοντων υμας)
John 1:7 – πιστευσωσιν ] πιστευσωσι
John 1:16 – οτι ] και
John 1:18 – εωρακεν ] εωρακε
John 1:18 – μονογενης θεος ] μονογενης υιος
John 1:20 – εγω ουκ ειμι ] ουκ ειμι εγω
John 1:21 – και λεγει ] λεγει
John 1:25 – και ηρωτησαν αυτον ] και ηρωτησαν αυτων
John 1:28 – βηθανια ] βηθανια (TR reads βηθαβαρα)

== History ==
The manuscript was dated by Scrivener and Gregory to the 12th or 13th century. It is presently assigned by the INTF to the 12th century.

According to the inscriptions the manuscript once belonged to the Church of the Saint George, presented by one Nicetas, and afterwards it belonged to the Monastery of Prodromus. The manuscript once belonged to Caesar de Missy, chaplain to George III, in 1747 (along with the codices 560, 561, ℓ 162, ℓ 239, ℓ 241). Then it belonged to William Hunter. The Hunter's collection remained in London for several years after his death – for the use of his nephew, Matthew Baillie (1761-1823) – and finally came to the Glasgow University in 1807.

The manuscript was added to the list of New Testament manuscripts by Scrivener (number 231) and Gregory (number 240). Gregory saw it in 1883. The manuscript has been exhibited on the following occasion: "Treasures of Scottish Libraries", in National Library of Scotland, Edinburgh, 1961.

The manuscript is not cited in the critical editions of the Greek New Testament (UBS3).

Currently the codex is housed at the Glasgow University Library, as a part of the Hunterian Collection (Ms. Hunter 405) in Glasgow.

== See also ==
- List of New Testament lectionaries
- Biblical manuscript
- Textual criticism

== Bibliography ==
- John Young & P. H. Aitken, A catalogue of the manuscripts in the Library of the Hunterian Museum in the University of Glasgow (Glasgow, 1908), pp. 324–325
- Ian C. Cunningham, Greek Manuscripts in Scotland: summary catalogue, with addendum (Edinburgh, 1982), no. 51
