= Lectionary 239 =

Lectionary ℓ 239
- New Testament manuscript
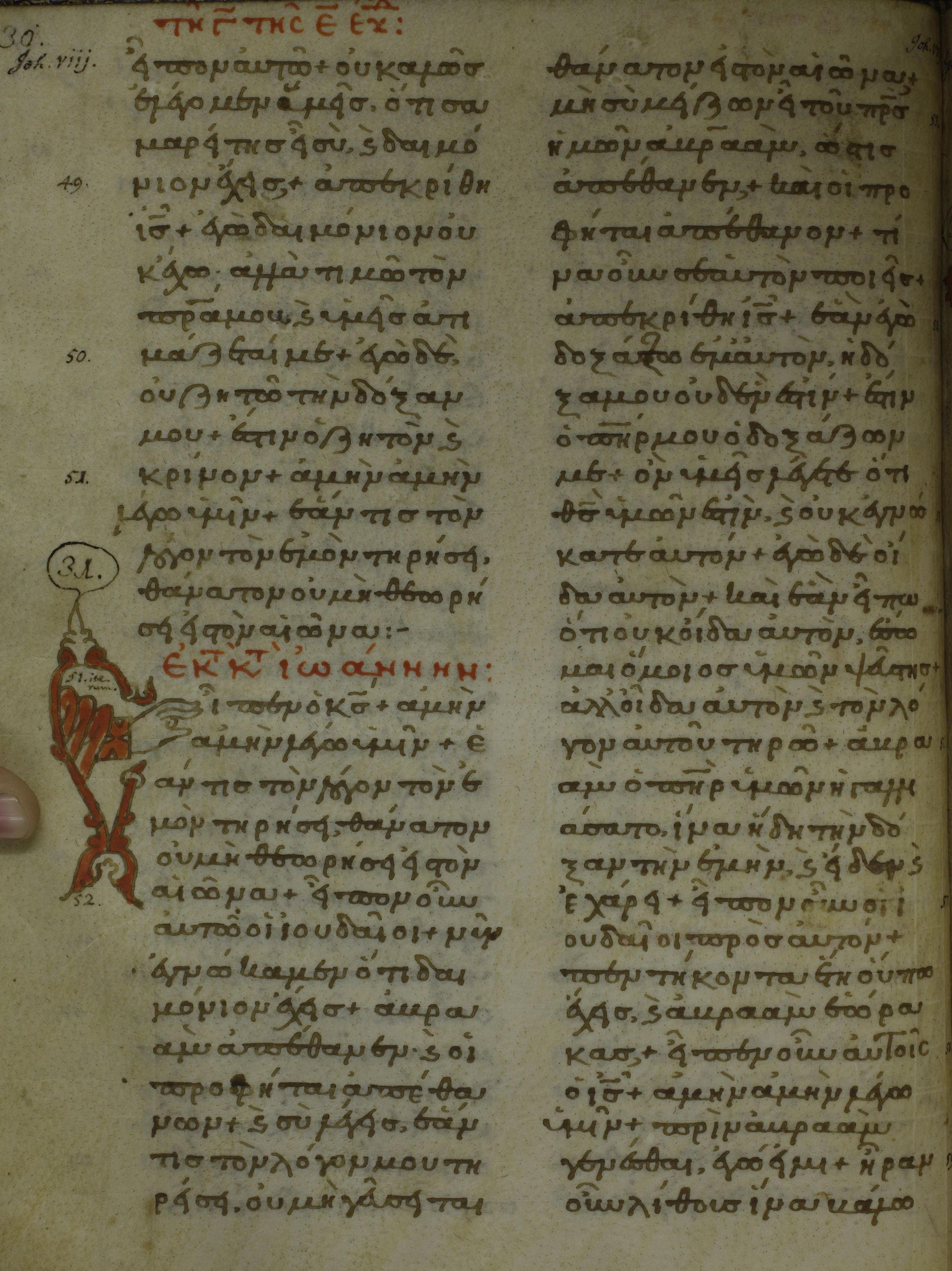
- Folio 15 verso
- Text: Evangelistarium †
- Date: 13th century
- Script: Greek
- Now at: Glasgow University Library
- Size: 26.6 cm by 20 cm

Lectionary 239, designated by siglum ℓ 239 (in the Gregory-Aland numbering) is a Greek manuscript of the New Testament, on parchment. Palaeographically it has been assigned to the 13th century. Scrivener labelled it by 230^{evl}. The manuscript has no complex contents.

== Description ==
The codex contains daily lessons for reading in Church from Easter to Pentecost. The lessons are taken from the Gospels of John, Matthew, Luke lectionary (Evangelistarium), with some lacunae at the end. The cover is from paper.

The text is written in Greek minuscule letters, on 112 parchment leaves (26.6 cm by 20 cm), in two columns per page, 27-36 lines per page. The rubricated initial letter for E with right hand making the orthodox sign of the cross. The error of itacism is frequent (especially interchange ε → αι). The nomina sacra are written in an abbreviated way.

On the last folio 112 verso it contains a grotesque twisted dragon ornament (in red and white coils). At the foot of the page in De Missy's hand (?): "Ex libris Caesaris De Missy, Berolinensis:— | Londini: Anno Domini 1748."

The lessons are numbered by modern hand (probably by de Missy).

Textual readings

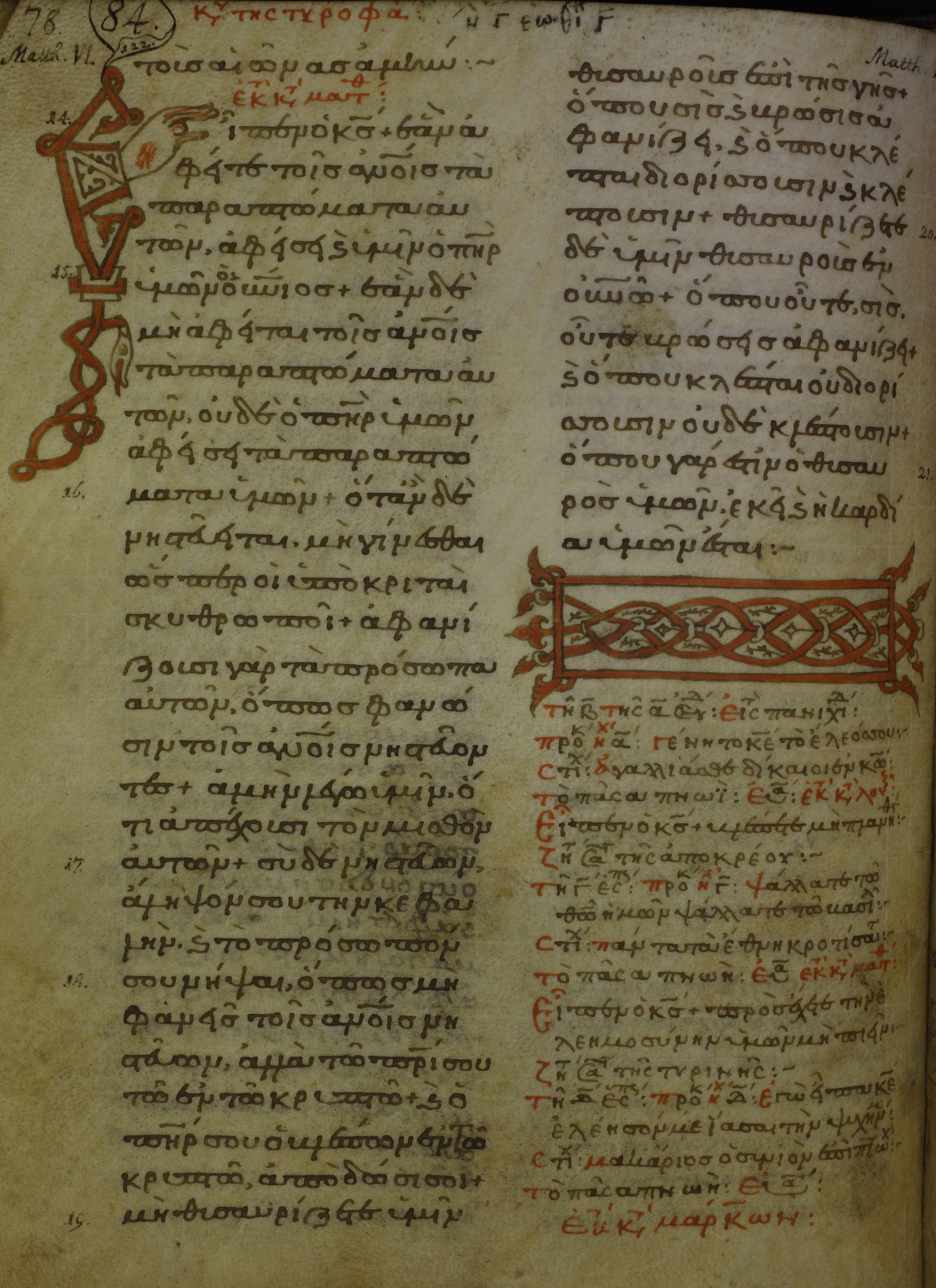
Folio 39 verso with text of Matthew 6:14-21

The word before the bracket is the reading of the UBS edition, the word after the bracket is the reading of the manuscript. The reading of Textus Receptus in bold.

Matthew 6:16 – ως ] ωσπερ
Matthew 6:16 – omit ] οτι
Matthew 6:18 – κρυφαιω ] κρυπτω
Matthew 6:21 – σου ] υμων
John 1:18 – μονογενης θεος ] ο μονογενης υιος
John 1:27 – omit ] ος εμπροσθεν μου γεγονεν
John 1:28 – βηθανια ] βηθανια (TR reads βηθαβαρα)
John 3:15 – εν αυτω ] εις αυτον
John 3:15 – omit ] μη αποληται αλλ

== History ==
According to the colophon it was written in A.D. 1259. It has been assigned by the Institute for New Testament Textual Research to the 13th century.

The manuscript once belonged to César de Missy (1703–1775), chaplain to George III, (along with the codices 560, 561, ℓ 162, ℓ 240, ℓ 241), according to note it was in London in 1748. Then it belonged to William Hunter. The Hunter's collection remained in London for several years after his death – for the use of his nephew, Matthew Baillie (1761–1823) – and finally moved to the University of Glasgow in 1807.

The manuscript was added to the list of New Testament manuscripts by Scrivener (number 230) and Gregory (number 239). Gregory saw it in 1883. The manuscript was examined and described by John Young, P. Henderson Aitken, and Ian C. Cunningham.

The manuscript is not cited in the critical editions of the Greek New Testament (UBS3).

The codex is housed at the Glasgow University Library (Ms. Hunter 440) in Glasgow, as a part of the Hunterian Collection.

== See also ==
- List of New Testament lectionaries
- Biblical manuscript
- Textual criticism

== Bibliography ==
- A. Turyn, Dated Greek Manuscripts of the Thirteenth and Fourteenth Centuries in the Libraries of Great Britain, Dumbarton Oaks Series XVII, (Washington, D. C., 1980), 6, p. 20
