= Hunterian Collection =

Specimens owned by William Hunter

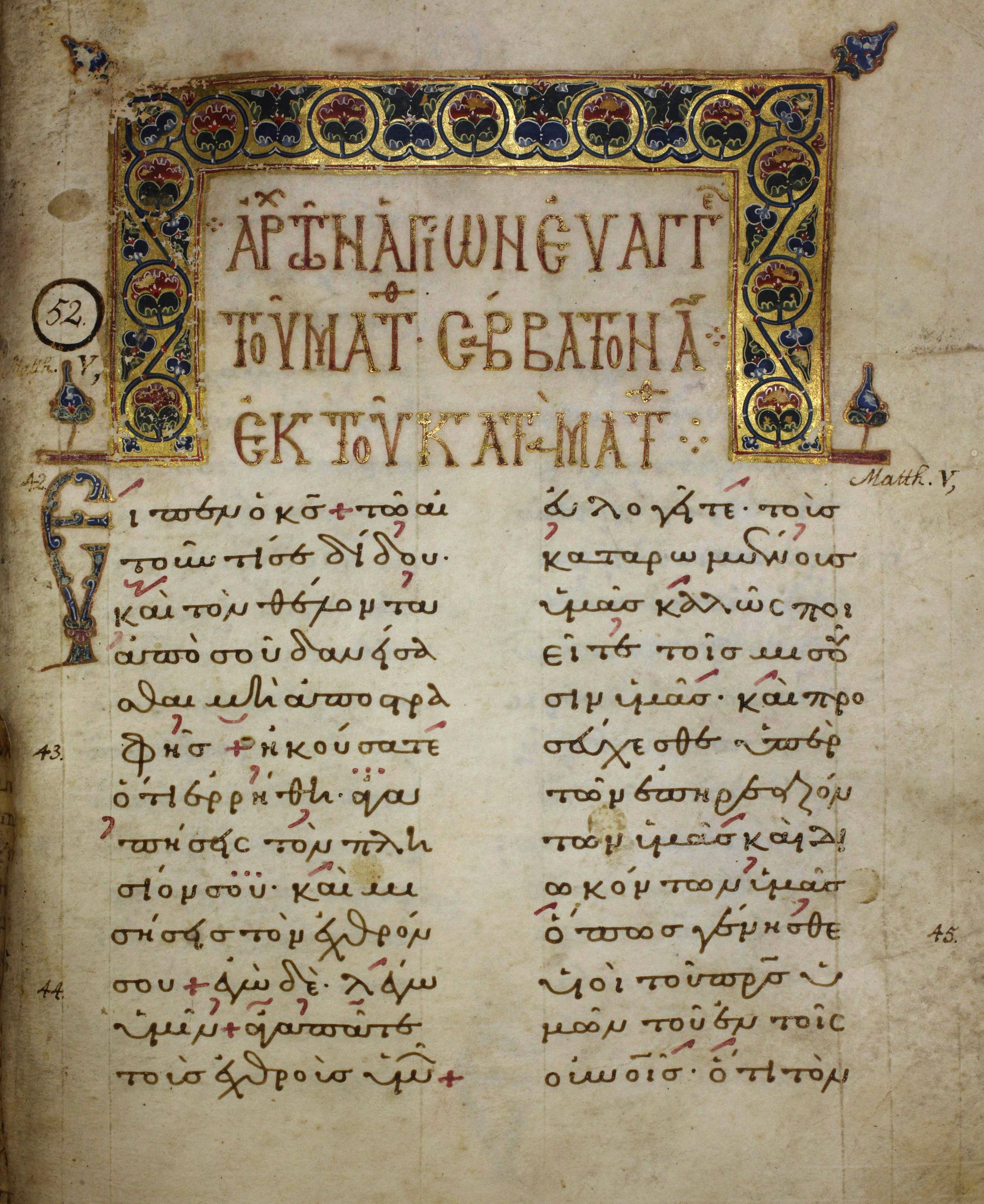
Lectionary 240 one of the manuscript from the Hunterian Collection

The Hunterian Collection is one of the best-known collections of the University of Glasgow and is cared for by the Hunterian Museum and Art Gallery and Glasgow University Library. It contains 650 manuscripts and some 10,000 printed books, 30,000 coins and 15,000 anatomical and natural history specimens. The collection was originally assembled by the anatomist William Hunter.

== History ==
The collection was assembled by the anatomist and physician, William Hunter (1718–83), who was an avid collector of coins, medals, paintings, shells, minerals, books and manuscripts. Considerable purchases were made in Paris from monastic houses and private libraries, such as those of César de Missy and Jean-Baptiste Colbert. Other major acquisitions were made in Vienna and Italy.

The library and other collections remained in London after Hunter's death for the use of his nephew, the physician and pathologist, Matthew Baillie (1761–1823), as well as William Cumberland Cruikshank (1745–1800). It moved to the University of Glasgow in 1807. The coins were stored for six years in the Bank of Scotland.

== Collection ==
=== Manuscripts and books ===
The manuscripts number around 650, of which approximately two thirds are medieval (biblical manuscripts) or Renaissance in origin; over a hundred of the remaining manuscripts are oriental (Persian and Arabic). The oldest manuscript is the Homilies of Saint Basil, dated by a colophon to the year 859. The printed books include 534 incunabula. Hunter purchased a collection of biblical manuscripts from Caesar de Missy.

About a third of Hunter's books are on the subject of medicine. They include key historical texts by authors including Hippocrates, Galen, Vesalius and William Harvey, as well as the writings of Hunter's contemporaries, such as William Smellie, Albinus and Albrecht von Haller.

=== Anatomical and natural history specimens ===
Hunter's collection contained about 15,000 specimens and preparations focusing on human anatomy and pathology, and natural history.

=== Coins ===
Hunter began to collect coins in about 1770, spending over £22,000 on them before his death in 1783. The resulting collection is believed to be the finest ever assembled by a private individual. George MacDonald estimated, "Its trays contain about 30,000 specimens, of which over 12,000 are Greek and nearly the same number Roman."

According to the Introduction of Catalogue of Greek Coins in the Hunterian Collection (MacDonald 1899), Hunter purchased many important collections, including those of Horace Walpole and the bibliophile Thomas Crofts. In 1782, in Vienna, he purchased the Hess collection, including around 700 Roman Imperial gold coins, for £2,400. King George III even donated an Athenian gold piece.

== Some manuscripts ==
- Minuscule 560
- Minuscule 561
- Minuscule 562
- Minuscule 563
- Lectionary 162
- Lectionary 239
- Lectionary 240
- Lectionary 241
