= Minuscule 562 =

- New Testament manuscript
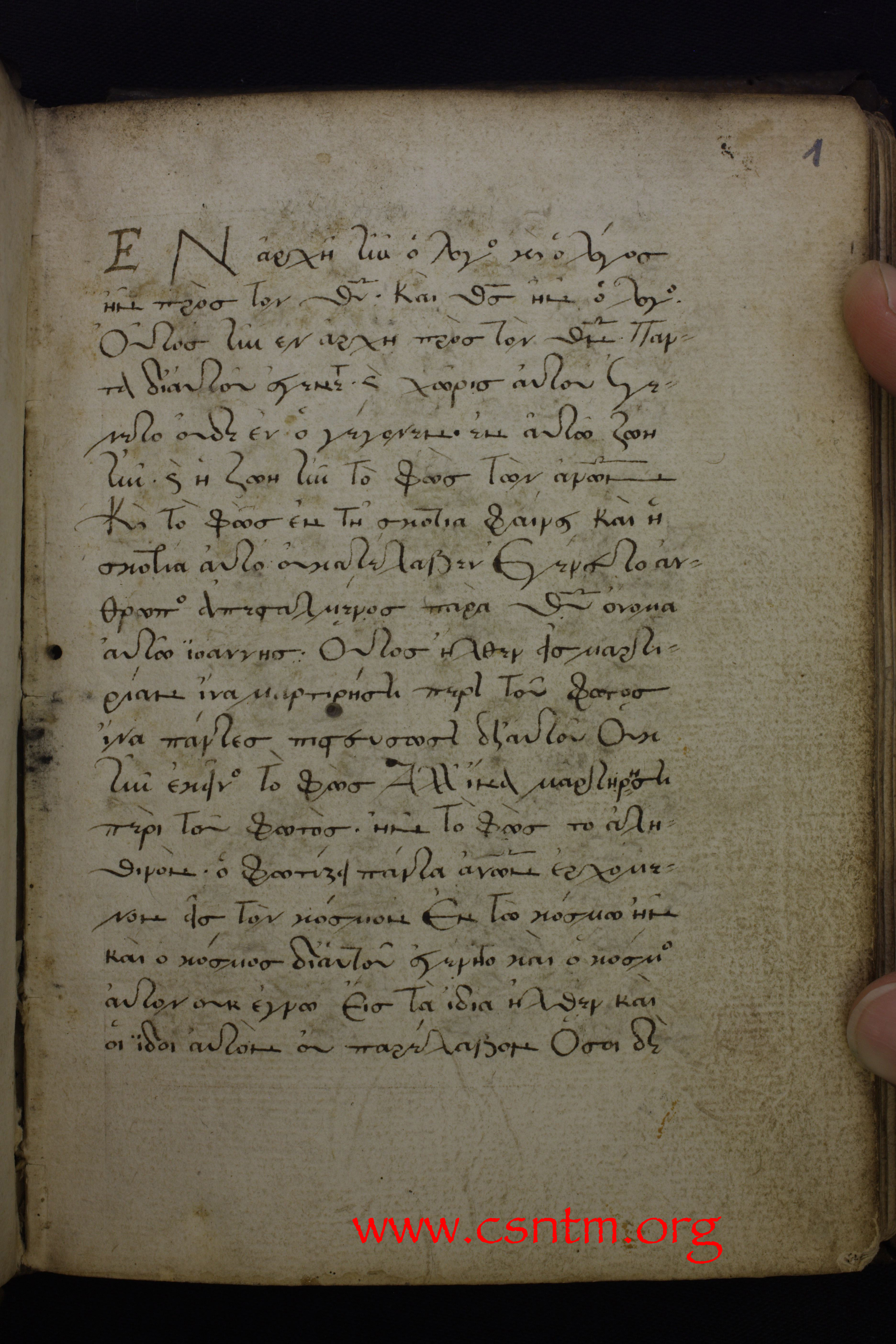
- Text: Gospel of John
- Date: 16th century
- Script: Greek
- Now at: Glasgow University Library
- Size: 14.2 cm by 10.5 cm
- Type: Byzantine / mixed
- Category: none

Minuscule 562 (in the Gregory-Aland numbering), ε 604 (in the Soden numbering), is a Greek minuscule manuscript of the New Testament, on paper. Palaeographically it has been assigned to the 16th century. Scrivener labelled it by number 522.

== Description ==
The codex contains the text of the Gospel of John on the first 58 leaves (size 14.2 cm by 10.5 cm). The leaves 59-78 contain Mithridates. The manuscript was written by many hands. The writing is in one column per page, 20 lines per page. It contains Latin κεφαλαια (chapters) at the left margin.

== Text ==
It does not contain the text of Pericope Adulterae (John 7:53-8:11). Aland did not place the Greek text of the codex in any Category.

== History ==
The manuscript was announced by Gustav Haenel. It was added to the list of the New Testament manuscripts by Scrivener (522). Gregory saw it in 1883.

Currently the manuscript is housed at the Glasgow University Library (Ms. Hunter 170) in Glasgow.

== See also ==
- List of New Testament minuscules
- Biblical manuscript
- Textual criticism
- Minuscule 560
- Minuscule 561
