= Lectionary 162 =

Lectionary ℓ 162
- New Testament manuscript
- Text: Apostolarion
- Date: 12th century
- Script: Greek
- Now at: Glasgow University Library
- Size: 28 by 20 cm

Lectionary 162, designated by siglum ℓ 162 (in the Gregory-Aland numbering) is a Greek manuscript of the New Testament, on parchment. Palaeographically it has been assigned to the 12th century. Formerly it was labelled as Lectionary 45^{a}.

== Description ==
The codex contains lessons from the Acts and Epistles lectionary (Apostolarion), on 239 parchment leaves (28 cm by 20 cm), originally 242 leaves. Lost leaves were supplied on paper. The text is written in Greek minuscule letters, in two columns per page, 22 lines per page. It has breathings and accents in red.

It contains musical notes.

== History ==
The manuscript was written by order of Luke from Antioch. In 1747 it belonged to Caesar de Missy, along with the codices 560, 561, ℓ 239, ℓ 240, ℓ 241.

The manuscript was digitized by the Center for the Study of New Testament Manuscripts in 2008.

The manuscript is not cited in the critical editions of the Greek New Testament (UBS3).

Currently the codex is located in the Glasgow University Library (Ms. Hunter 406) at Glasgow.

== See also ==
- List of New Testament lectionaries
- Biblical manuscript
- Textual criticism

== Bibliography ==
- Ian C. Cunningham, Greek Manuscripts in Scotland: summary catalogue, with addendum (Edinburgh, 1982), no. 52;
- John Young & P.H. Aitken, A catalogue of the manuscripts in the Library of the Hunterian Museum in the University of Glasgow (Glasgow, 1908), pp. 325–327.
