= Thomas Payne (publisher) =

English bookseller and publisher (c. 1718 – 1799)

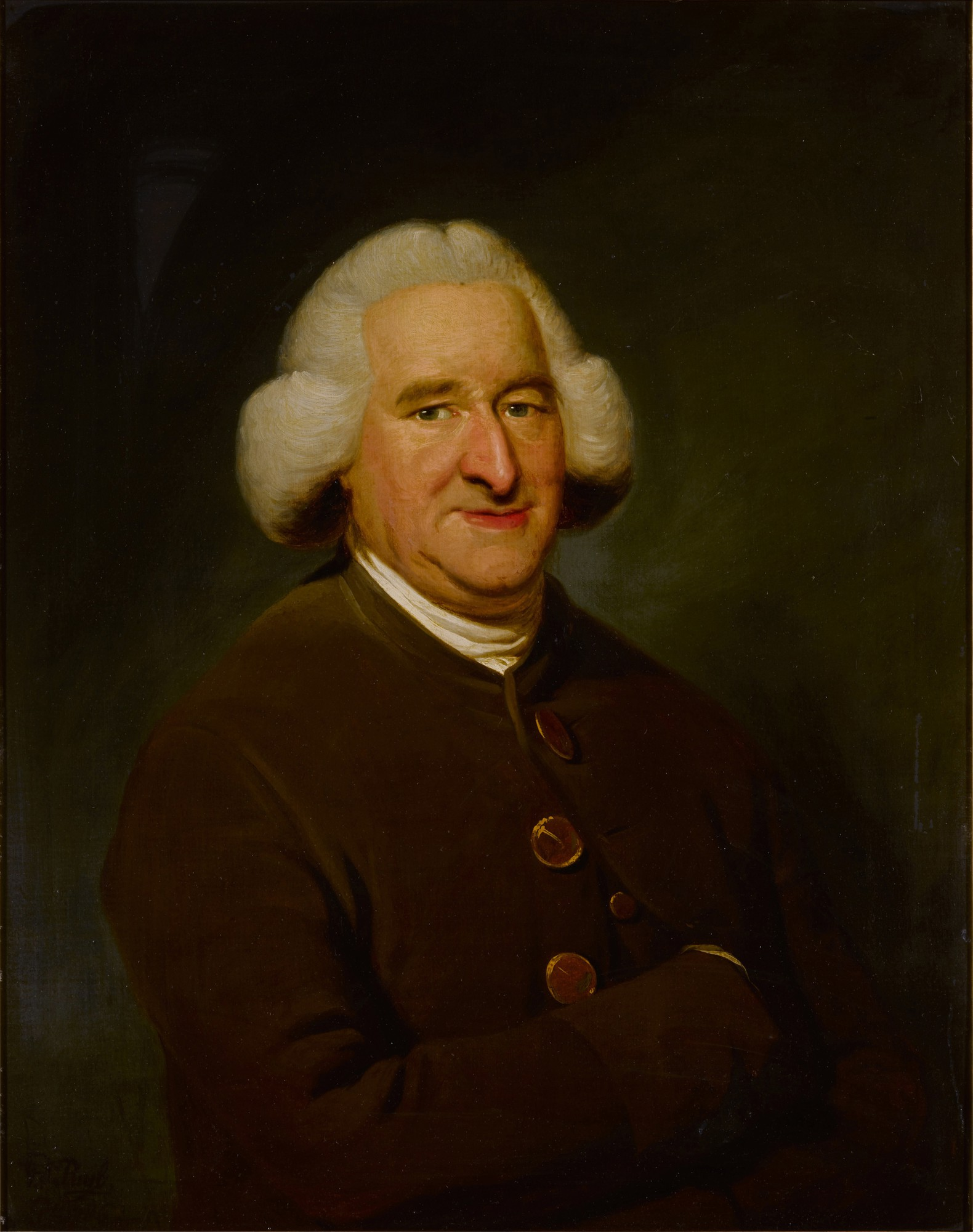
- Portrait by Gerard van der Puyl
- Born: c. 1718; Brackley, Northamptonshire, England
- Died: 1799 (aged 80–81)
- Occupation: Bookseller
- Children: 2

Thomas Payne (c. 1718 – 1799) was an important bookseller and publisher in 18th-century London.

== Life ==
Payne was born in Brackley, Northamptonshire. From 1750 he ran a shop at Mews Gate in Castle Street near Leicester Fields (the site is now occupied by the National Gallery). The premises were notoriously small, but popular with the literati of that period.

Referred to as the "Literary Coffee House", the shop became a sort of club during the day for discussions on all subjects. Patrons included George Steevens, Thomas Crofts, John Hoole and Thomas Tyrwhitt. Payne issued sale catalogues on a regular basis, as did many of his contemporaries, and these are now good sources of information about prices, popular books, bookbinding, and other aspects of 18th-century book history.

Payne's daughter Sarah married James Burney, a naval officer and brother of novelist Frances Burney, some of whose work Payne had published. He retired to Finchley in 1790 leaving the business in the hands of his son, also Thomas Payne (1752–1831). He is buried at St. Mary's church in Finchley, north London.
