= César de Missy =

Prussian theologian (1703–1775)

César de Missy (1703–1775) was a Prussian theologian, chaplain to George III, scholar of the New Testament, and book collector.

== Career ==
De Missy spent his life collecting manuscripts for a new edition of the New Testament. Some manuscripts he brought from Mount Athos (e.g. British Library, Add MS 4949).

To his collection belonged the manuscripts of the New Testament 449, 483, 560, 561, ℓ 38, ℓ 162, ℓ 239, ℓ 240, ℓ 241, and other. Afterwards the collection belonged to William Hunter, then to Matthew Baillie (1761–1823), and finally it came to the Glasgow University in 1807.

== Personal life ==
He was married (as a widower) to Elizabeth Hollis at St John Clerkenwell on 5 July 1771.

== Works ==
- Les Larmes Du Refuge: Ou Sermon Sur Le Pseaume CXXXVII (1735)
