= Thomas Crofts =

British bibliophile and Anglican priest

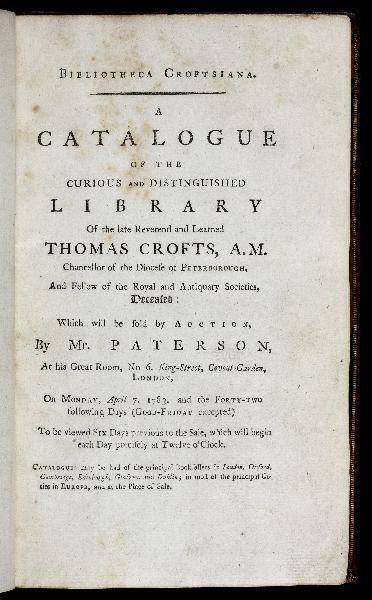
- A catalogue of his collection
- Born: 1722; Monmouth
- Died: 1781 (aged 58–59); Milton Hall
- Education: Wadham College Oxford
- Occupations: Anglican priest; bibliophile
- Known for: Bibliophile

The Reverend and Learned Thomas Crofts FRS FSA (1722 – 8 November 1781) was a British bibliophile, Anglican priest, Fellow of the Royal Society and European traveller.

== Early life ==
Crofts was born in Monmouth, Wales and was the son of John Crofts. At the age of 17 he matriculated at Wadham College, Oxford. The University of Oxford awarded him the degree Bachelor of Arts in February 1743 and the degree Master of Arts in 1746.

== The Grand Tour ==
In the following 20 years Crofts alternated between the closeted life of a Fellow of an Oxford College and at least three extended tours of Europe. On one such visit (1758–1759) he accompanied a young Oxford Graduate, Thomas Knight, a cousin and future benefactor of the family of Jane Austen the novelist, on the Grand Tour. On such visits Crofts brought back many rare books and coins.

In 1763 Crofts was installed as Rector of Donyat, Somerset. He then travelled to Aleppo, Syria where he was chaplain to the English Factory in the late 1760s and there continued researching and collecting antiquities.

== Literati ==
In 1770 Crofts returned to England as Chaplain to the 4th Duke of Leeds and lived in Bury Street in the fashionable district of St. James. He became a member of the literati frequenting the so-called 'Literary Coffee House' at the shop of the bookseller and publisher Thomas Payne. His friends and colleagues included Thomas Tyrwhitt, George Steevens, John Hoole and the anatomist and numismatist William Hunter. His library was now very extensive and books borrowed from it helped Tyrwhitt with 'The Canterbury Tales of Chaucer' (1775) and also Hoole with his translation of 'Orlando Furioso' (1783). Crofts also came to the attention of the Dilettante Society as Lord Seaforth, the Marquis of Carmarthen (Francis Osborne son of the Duke of Leeds) and the naturalist Joseph Banks nominated him for membership in The Royal Society in March 1776. It was also in 1776 that Crofts was involved with the publication of the spoof poems of Thomas Rowley, a medieval monk, which had in fact been written by Thomas Chatterton (1752–1770). Contemporary correspondence shows that Crofts recommended Tyrwhitt as an expert to George Catcott, who possessed the 'manuscripts', and he also suggested Payne as a publisher. These poems were subsequently edited by Tyrrwhitt and published as genuine in 1777 only for Tyrwhitt to recant and expose them as forgeries.

== Health problems and death ==
During the late 1770s Crofts' health began to deteriorate. He sold his large collection of coins to Hunter in January 1781 and died at the home of the 4th Earl Fitzwilliam at Milton Park, Northamptonshire on 8 Nov that year.

A tribute in the 'Biographical Memoirs of William Bowyer' described Crofts as "distinguished for his general attainments as well as antient erudition . . gleaned . . not of reading only but of intelligent travels". His extensive library was sold in over 8000 lots over 43 days in 1783. Copies of the Catalogue of the Sale 'Bibliotheca Croftsiana . . ' are still in existence and his books now reside in some of the important collections of the world.

== See also ==
- Hunterian Collection
