= William Cumberland Cruikshank =

British physician and anatomist

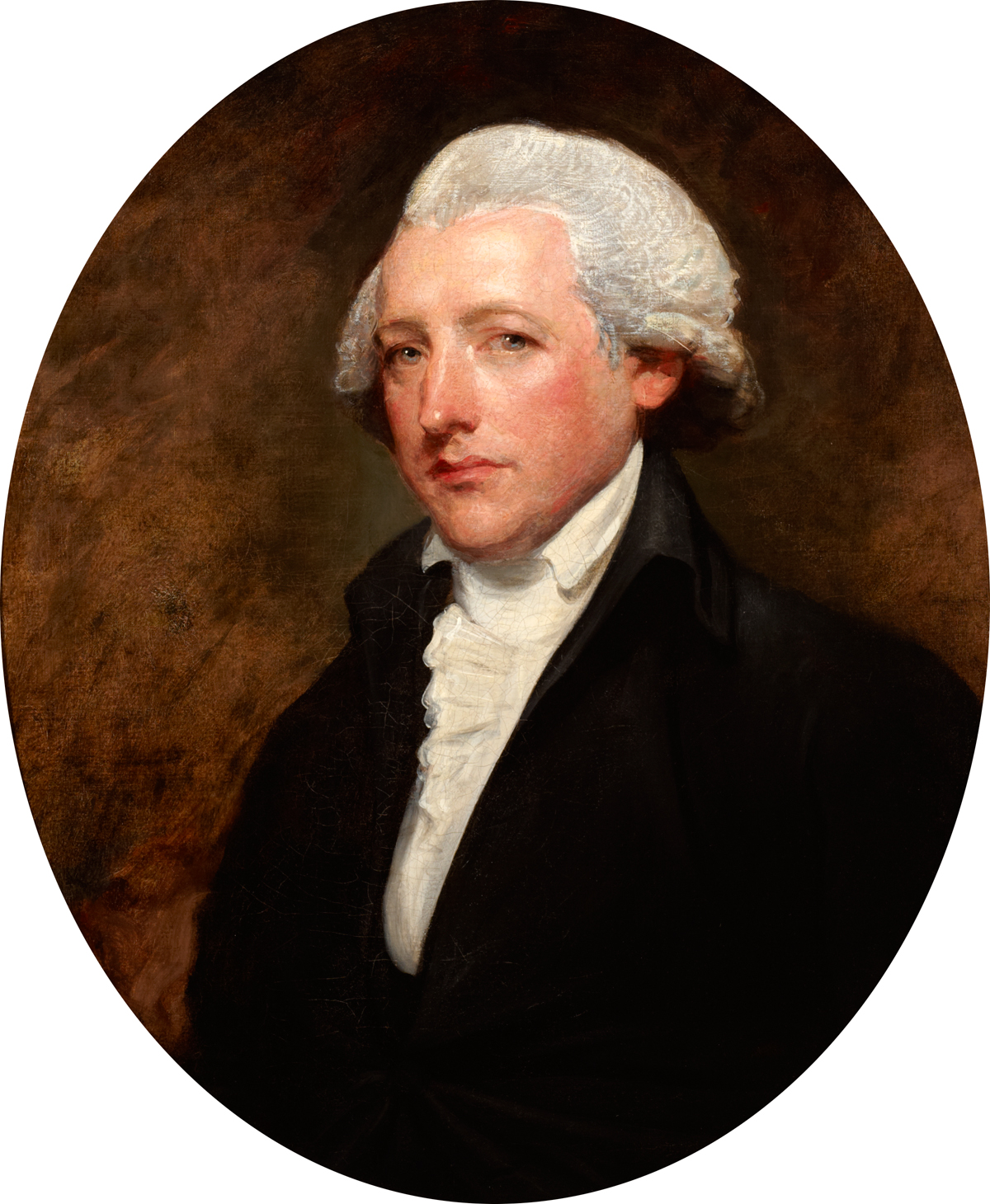
- portrait by Gilbert Stuart
- Born: 1745; Edinburgh
- Died: 27 June 1800 (aged 54–55)

William Cumberland Cruikshank (1745 in Edinburgh – 27 June 1800) was a British physician and anatomist. He was the author of The Anatomy of the Absorbing Vessels of the Human Body, which was first published in 1786.

He went to London in 1771 and became assistant to William Hunter in his anatomical work. In 1797, he was the first to demonstrate that a particular crystallizable substance exists in the urine and is precipitated from it by nitric acid.

He was elected a Fellow of the Royal Society in June 1797.
