= Papyrus 22 =

Papyrus 𝔓^{22}
- New Testament manuscript
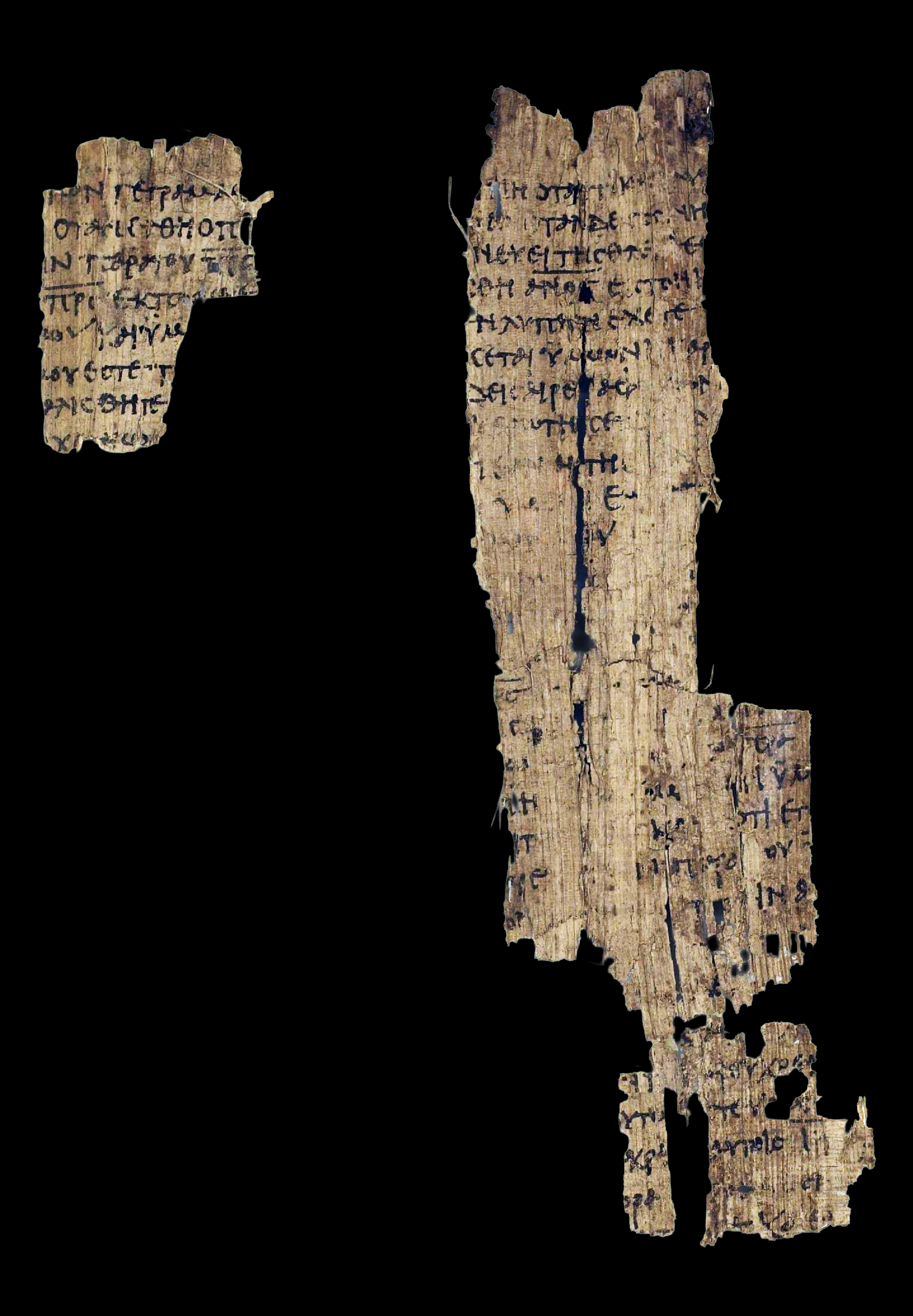
- Name: P. Oxy. 1228
- Text: John 15–16 †
- Date: 3rd century
- Script: Greek
- Found: Egypt
- Now at: Glasgow University Library
- Cite: B. P. Grenfell & A. S. Hunt, Oxyrynchus Papyri X, (London 1914), pp. 14-16
- Size: 18.5 x 5 cm
- Type: Alexandrian text-type
- Category: I

Papyrus 22 is an early copy of the New Testament in Greek. It is designated by 𝔓^{22} (in the Gregory-Åland numbering of New Testament manuscripts), and is a papyrus manuscript containing text from the Gospel of John. Using the study of comparative writings styles, (palaeography), the manuscript has been dated to the early 3rd century CE. It is the only identified New Testament papyrus to have been written originally as a roll; not a codex or re-using the back of a scroll.

== Description ==
The original manuscript was likely a roll, and currently only has extant John 15:25–16:2.21–32. The text is written in two consecutive columns, with the reverse side of the roll being blank. The manuscript employs conventional Nomina Sacra: Π̅Σ̅ Π̅Ν̅Α̅ Π̅Ρ̅Σ̅ Π̅Ρ̅Α̅ Ι̅Η̅Σ̅ Α̅Ν̅Ο̅Σ̅. The text contains no punctuation marks.

The Greek text of this codex is considered a representative of the Alexandrian text-type. Åland described it as a normal text and placed it in Category I. This manuscript displays an independent text. Coincidences with the Codex Sinaiticus are frequent, but divergences are noticeable. There are no singular readings. According to Reverend Ellwood Schofield, the papyrus "rather represents the eclecticism of the early papyri before the crystallizing of the textual families had taken place."

== History ==
The papyrus was found in Oxyrhynchus, Egypt, and was originally published by Papyrologists Bernard Grenfell and Arthur Hunt in the Oxyrhynchus Papyri, Volume 10, designated as P. Oxy. 1228. To determine its palaeographical dating, Grenfell and Hunt compared the graphical writing style to P. Oxy 654, which according to papyrologist Philip Comfort "can be dated confidently to the mid-third century." Comfort states that though the writing style of 𝔓^{22} is "a bit heavier", it should be dated to the same time period. It is currently housed at the Glasgow University Library (MS Gen 1026) in Glasgow.

== See also ==
- List of New Testament papyri
