= Minuscule 560 =

- New Testament manuscript
- Text: Gospels
- Date: 11th century
- Script: Greek
- Now at: Glasgow University Library
- Size: 18 cm by 14 cm
- Type: Byzantine text-type
- Category: V

Minuscule 560 (in the Gregory-Aland numbering), ε 1288 (in the Soden numbering), is a Greek minuscule manuscript of the New Testament, on parchment. Palaeographically it has been assigned to the 11th century. Scrivener labelled it by number 520.

== Description ==
The codex contains a complete text of the four Gospels on 367 parchment leaves (size 18 cm by 14 cm). The manuscript was written by many hands. The writing is in one column per page, 18-24 lines per page.

It contains Epistula ad Carpianum, the Eusebian tables at the beginning, tables of the κεφαλαια before each Gospel, numerals of the κεφαλαια, the τιτλοι, the Ammonian Sections, a references to the Eusebian Canons, Synaxarion, Menologion, and pictures.

== Text ==
The Greek text of the codex is a representative of the Byzantine text-type. Aland placed it in Category V. According to Claremont Profile Method it represents the textual family K^{x} in Luke 1, Luke 10, and Luke 20.

== History ==
The manuscript was written in Italy. It was in Caesar de Missy's collection in London in 1748 (along with the codex 561, ℓ 162, ℓ 239, ℓ 240).

The manuscripts was added to the list of the New Testament minuscule manuscripts by F. H. A. Scrivener (520) and C. R. Gregory (560).

Currently the manuscript is housed at the Glasgow University Library (Ms. Hunter 475) in Glasgow.

== See also ==
- List of New Testament minuscules
- Biblical manuscript
- Textual criticism
- Minuscule 562
