= Lectionary 38 =

Lectionary ℓ 38
- New Testament manuscript
- Text: Evangelistarion, Apostolos
- Date: 15th-century
- Script: Greek
- Now at: University of Göttingen
- Size: 27.5 cm by 20 cm

Lectionary 38, designated by siglum ℓ 38 (in the Gregory-Aland numbering). It is a Greek manuscript of the New Testament, on parchment leaves. Palaeographically it has been assigned to the 15th century. Formerly it was labelled as 5^{a}.

== Description ==
The codex contains Lessons from the Gospels of John, Matthew, Luke lectionary (Evangelistarium), and Lessons from Book of Acts and Pauline epistles (Apostolos), with some lacunae. It is written in Greek minuscule letters, on 56 parchment leaves (27.5 cm by 20 cm), in two columns per page, in 27-30 lines per page.

It has singular reading in Acts 12:25 εις την Αντιοχειαν (to Antioch), majority reads εις Ιερουσαλημ (to Jerusalem);

== History ==
Formerly it was held in the Konstamonitou monastery at Athos. Afterwards it belonged to Caesar de Missy. It was examined by Matthaei.

The manuscript is sporadically cited in the critical editions of the Greek New Testament (UBS3).

Currently the codex is located in the University of Göttingen (Cod. Ms. theol. 33) in Göttingen.

== See also ==
- List of New Testament lectionaries
- Biblical manuscript
- Textual criticism
