= Minuscule 561 =

- New Testament manuscript
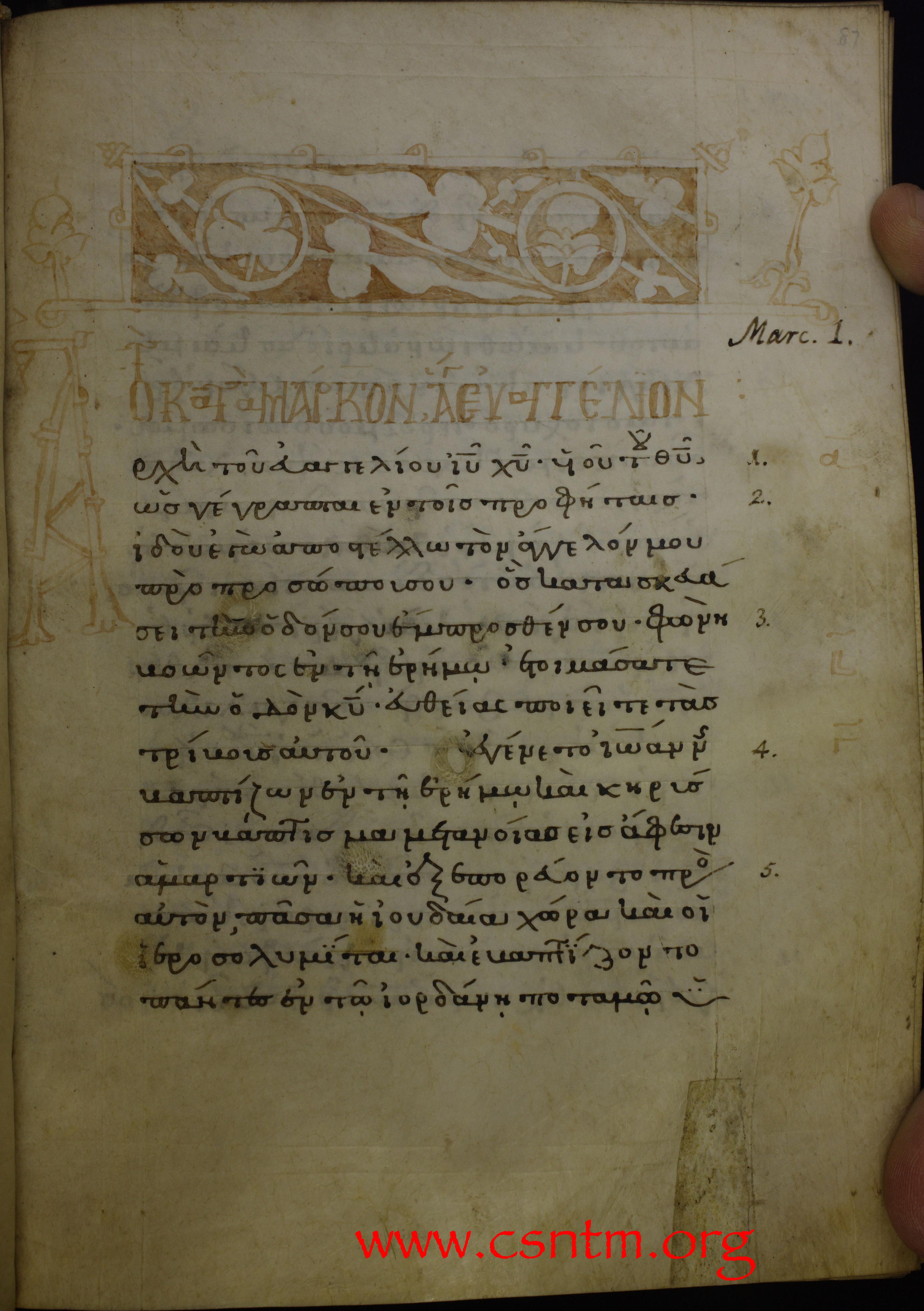
- Folio 87 recto, the first page of Mark
- Text: Gospels
- Date: 13th century
- Script: Greek
- Now at: Glasgow University Library
- Size: 19 cm by 13.5 cm
- Type: Byzantine / mixed
- Category: none
- Note: marginalia

Minuscule 561 (in the Gregory-Aland numbering), ε 1289 (in the Soden numbering), is a Greek minuscule manuscript of the New Testament, on parchment. Palaeographically it has been assigned to the 13th century. Scrivener labelled it by number 521.

The manuscript has complex contents. It has marginalia.

== Description ==
The codex contains a complete text of the four Gospels on 290 parchment leaves (size 19 cm by 13.5 cm). The manuscript was written by many hands. The writing is in one column per page, 21-25 lines per page.

The text is divided according to the κεφαλαια (chapters), whose numerals are given at the margin, and the τιτλοι (titles of chapters) at the top of the pages. There is also a division according to the smaller Ammonian Sections, (no references to the Eusebian Canons).

It contains Prolegomena, tables of the κεφαλαια (tables of contents) are placed before each Gospel, and subscriptions at the end of each Gospel.

== Text ==
The Greek text of the codex is a representative of the Byzantine text-type. Hermann von Soden classified to the textual family K^{x}. Aland did not placed it in any Category.

According to the Claremont Profile Method it represents the textual family K^{x} in Luke 1, Luke 10. In Luke 20 it has mixed Byzantine text.

== History ==
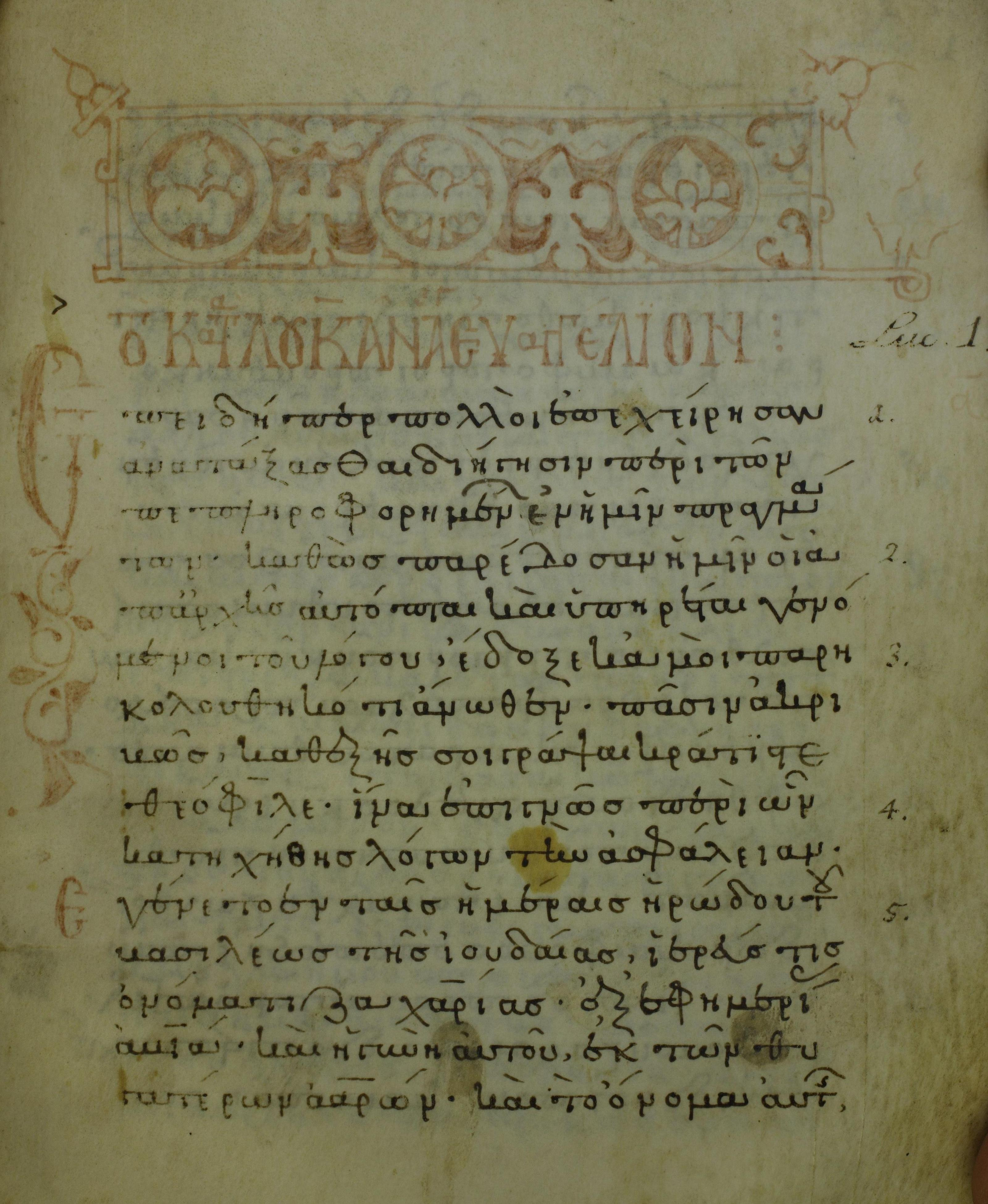
The first page of Luke (folio 147 recto)

According to the INTF it was written in the 13th-century.

The manuscript was written in Italy. It once belonged to Brian Walton in 1656. It was in Caesar de Missy's collection in London in 1748 (along with the codex 560, ℓ 162, ℓ 239). It was added to the list of the New Testament manuscripts by Scrivener (521) and Gregory (561).

Currently the manuscript is housed at the Glasgow University Library (Ms. Hunter 476) in Glasgow.

== See also ==
- List of New Testament minuscules
- Biblical manuscript
- Textual criticism
- Minuscule 562
