= Thomas Tyrwhitt =

English writer, classical scholar, and critic (1730–1786)

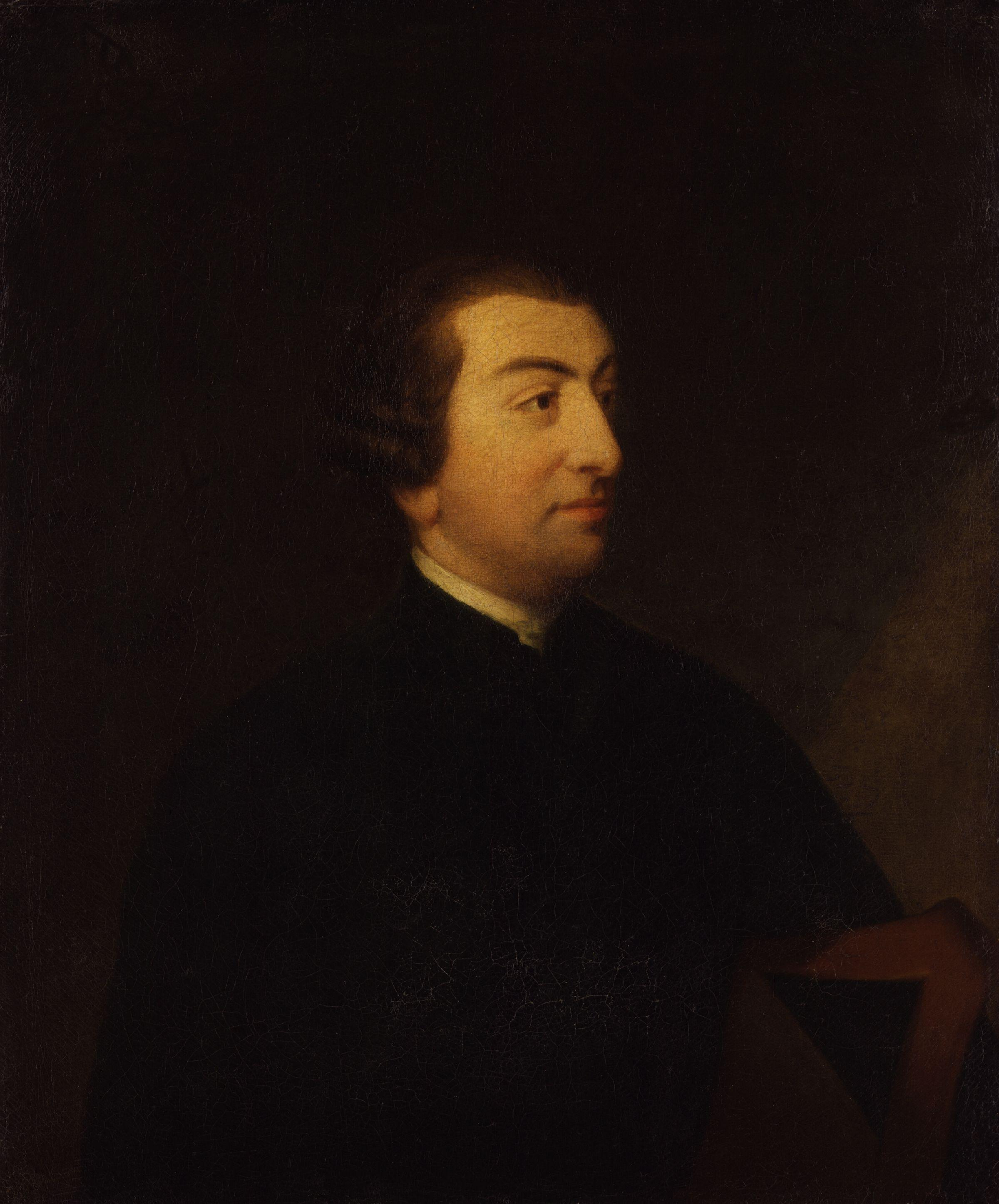
- Portrait of Thomas Tyrwhitt, 1788
- Born: 27 March 1730; London, England
- Died: 15 August 1786 (aged 56); London, England
- Occupations: Writer, scholar, critic

Thomas Tyrwhitt (/ˈtɪrɪt/; 27 March 1730 – 15 August 1786) was an English writer, classical scholar, and critic. He was best known for his edition of The Canterbury Tales in which he modernized the language and provided extensive notes as well as a glossary.

== Early life and education ==
He was born in London, where he also died. He was educated at Eton College and Queen's College, Oxford. He was elected a fellow of Merton College, Oxford in 1755. In 1756, he was appointed under-secretary at war, in 1762 clerk of the House of Commons. In 1768, he resigned his post, and spent the remainder of his life in learned retirement. In February 1771, he was elected a Fellow of the Royal Society. In 1784, he was elected a trustee of the British Museum, to which he bequeathed a portion of his valuable library.

== Works ==
His principal classical works are:

- Fragmenta Plutarchi II. inedita (1773), from a Harleian manuscript
- Dissertatio de Babrio (1776), containing some fables of Aesop, hitherto unedited, from a Bodleian manuscript
- the pseudo-Orphic De lapidibus (1781), which he assigned to the age of Constantius
- Conjecturae in Strabonem (1783)
- Isaeus De Meneclis hereditate (1785)
- Aristotle's Poetica, his most important work, published after his death under the superintendence of Thomas Burgess, bishop of Salisbury, in 1794.

Special mention is due of his editions of Chaucer's Canterbury Tales (1775–1778); and of Poems, supposed to have been written at Bristol by "Thomas Rowley" and others in the 15th century (1777–1778), with an appendix to prove that the poems were all the work of Thomas Chatterton. Tyrwhitt's bibliophile friend Thomas Crofts is credited with introducing Tyrwhitt in 1776 to George Catcott, the owner of the "manuscripts" of the poems. Initially Tyrwhitt was convinced that they were authentic, and pressed for publication in 1777. It was only when the third edition was published that Tyrwhitt changed his mind and pronounced the poems forgeries.

In 1782, he published a Vindication of the Appendix in reply to the arguments that they were authentic. While clerk of the House of Commons he edited Proceedings and Debates of the House of Commons, 1620–1621 from the original manuscript in the library of Queen's College, Oxford, and Henry Elsynge's The Manner of Holding Parliaments in England (1768).

== Sources ==
- Courtney, William Prideaux (1899). "Tyrwhitt, Thomas" . In Lee, Sidney (ed.). Dictionary of National Biography. Vol. 57. London: Smith, Elder & Co.
- Caldwell, Tanya. "Tyrwhitt, Thomas (1730–1786)". Oxford Dictionary of National Biography (online ed.). Oxford University Press. doi:10.1093/ref:odnb/27959. (Subscription, Wikipedia Library access or UK public library membership required.)
