= Matthew Baillie =

Scottish physician and pathologist

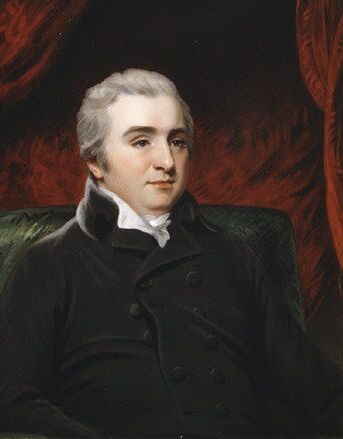
- portrait by Henry Bone after John Hoppner
- Born: 27 October 1761
- Died: 23 September 1823 (aged 61)
- Education: University of Glasgow; University of Oxford
- Scientific career
- Fields: medicine pathology
- Workplaces: Royal College of Physicians

Matthew Baillie FRS (27 October 1761 – 23 September 1823) was a Scottish physician and pathologist, credited with first identifying transposition of the great vessels (TGV) and situs inversus.

== Early life and education ==
Matthew Baillie was born in the manse at Shotts in Lanarkshire, the son of Rev Prof James Baillie DD (1723-1778) and his wife, Dorothea Hunter (sister of Dr John Hunter and Dr William Hunter. His father was Professor of Divinity at Glasgow University. His sisters were centenarian Agnes Baillie (1760-1861) and poet/author Joanna Baillie. He was a pupil of his uncle, the anatomist John Hunter and his father-in-law, Dr. Thomas Denman, a pre-eminent obstetrician in London at the turn of the nineteenth century, whose textbook on childbirth had been first published in 1788. Baillie was educated at the Old Grammar School of Hamilton (renamed the Hamilton Academy in 1848), the University of Glasgow, and obtained his MD from Balliol College, Oxford in 1789, having been named Snell Exhibitioner in 1779.

== Career ==
He was bequeathed £5000n on the death of his uncle William Hunter in 1783, also inheriting his uncle's house in Great Windmill Street in London, plus the adjacent medical school and museum. Baillie taught at the school from 1783 to 1803. He then taught anatomy and was appointed Physician at St George's Hospital in 1789, but gave up both posts to establish his own medical practice in Grosvenor Square, becoming Physician in Ordinary to George III. He became Fellow of the Royal College of Physicians in 1790, specialising in morbid anatomy.

He was elected a Fellow of the Royal Society in 1790 and delivered their Croonian Lecture in 1791 (on the subject of muscles). He was also the second President of the Medical and Chirurgical Society of London 1808–1810.

It was said of him,

His physical frame was feeble, compared with his mental powers. He was the middle stature, and of rather a slender form. His countenance was marked with a great deal of sagacity and penetration.

== Death ==
Baillie died of tuberculosis on 23 September 1823 in Duntisbourne, Gloucestershire, England at the age of 61 and was buried in Duntisbourne Abbots, Gloucestershire. There is also a memorial to him within Westminster Abbey. The memorial (with bust) is by James Heffernan working in the studio of Francis Chantrey.

== Family ==
Baillie was married to Sophia Denman, the sister of Thomas Denman, 1st Baron Denman.

== Works ==
His 1793 book, The Morbid Anatomy of Some of the Most Important Parts of the Human Body, is considered the first systematic study of pathology, and the first publication in English on pathology as a separate subject. He is credited with first identifying transposition of the great vessels (TGV) and situs inversus. The 1793 book went into multiple editions and was translated into numerous languages, and five editions were released in Britain before his death.

- The Morbid Anatomy of Some of the Most Important Parts of the Human Body (1793)
- Anatomy of the Gravid Uterus, by William Hunter published by Baillie (1794)
- A Series of Engravings, tending to illustrate the Morbid Anatomy of some of the most Important Parts of the Human Body (1799, 1802, 1812)
- Lectures and Observations on Medicine by the late Matthew Baillie (1825)
- An Account of a Particular Change of Structure in the Human Ovarium (Philosophical Transactions, London, 1789, Vol.79, pp. 71–78)

== See also ==
- Dr. Sir Richard Croft, 6th Baronet
- Hunterian Collection
