= Glasgow University Library =

Library in Glasgow, Scotland

University of Glasgow Library
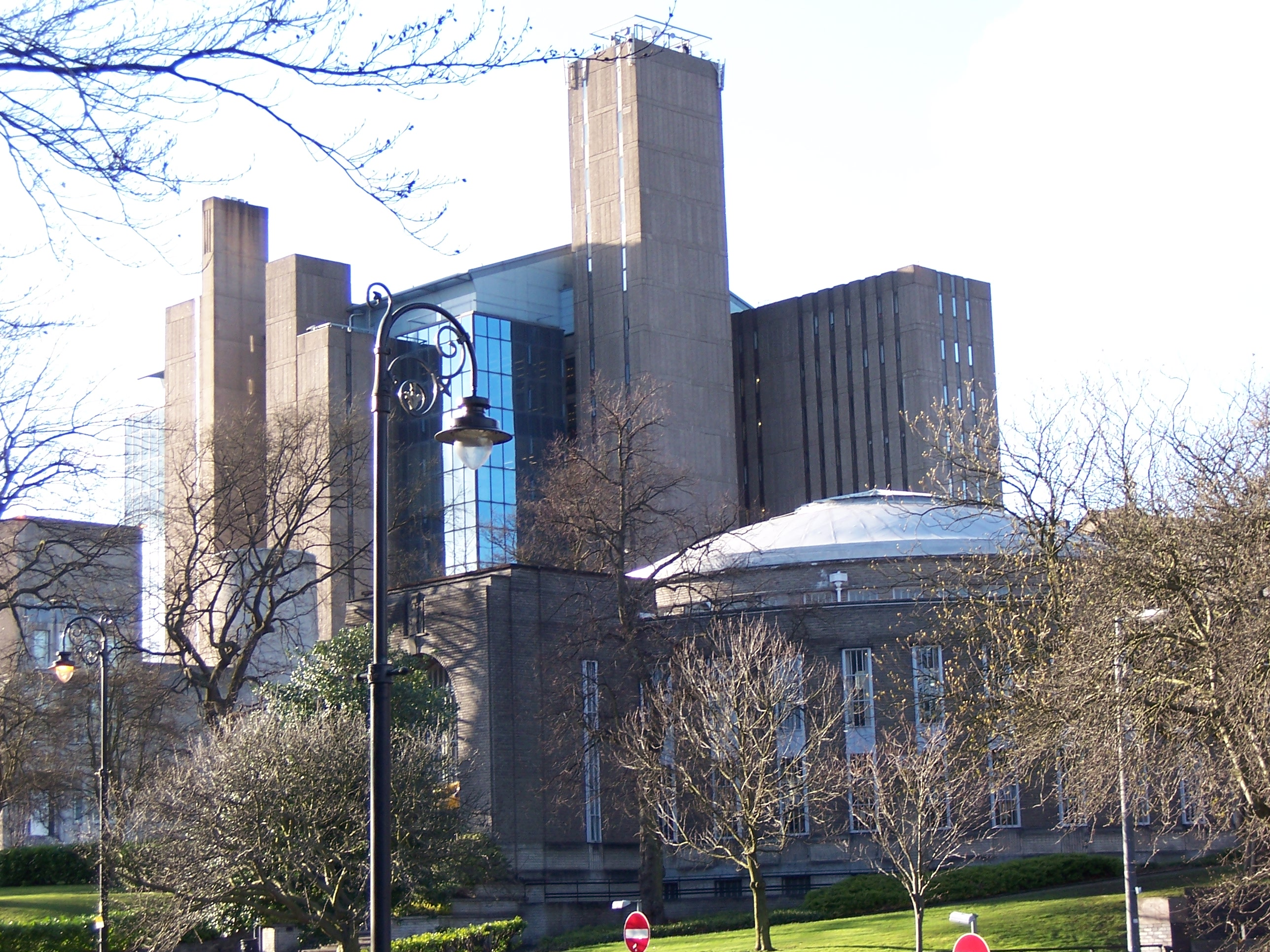
- The Main Library Building, prior to 2012, with the McMillan Reading Room in the foreground.
- 55.8733°N 4.2890°W
- Location: Glasgow, Scotland
- Type: Academic library
- Established: 1475
- Branches: 8

Collection
- Items collected: Books, manuscripts, journals and electronic resources
- Size: 2.5 million physical volumes across all campus libraries, (4.3 million including e-books).
- Legal deposit: Formerly (1709–1836)

Access and use
- Access requirements: Staff, students and alumni of the University of Glasgow

Other information
- Director: Susan Ashworth (librarian)
- Employees: 334
- Affiliation: University of Glasgow
- Website: www.lib.gla.ac.uk

Glasgow University Library in the main library of the University of Glasgow. At the turn of the 21st century, the main library building itself held 1,347,000 catalogued print books, and 53,300 journals. In total, the university library system including branch libraries now holds approximately 2.5 million books and journals, along with access to 1,853,000 e-books, and over 50,000 e-journals. The University also holds extensive archival material in a separate building. This includes the Scottish Business Archive, which alone amounts to 6.2 kilometres of manuscripts.

The current 12-storey building was opened in 1968 and is a prominent landmark in Glasgow's West End. In 2014, there were over 1.7 million visits made to the library.

== History ==
The first explicit mention of the Library is dated November 1475, when the first donations by the University's Chancellor, Bishop John Laing, were recorded. After the Reformation the University of Glasgow and its Library were reinvigorated under the Principalship of Andrew Melville in 1574–1580. The Library grew steadily throughout the 18th century due largely to the fact that it was granted legal deposit status between 1709 and 1836. Legal deposit ceased in 1836 and the Library was granted an annual lump sum which allowed it to develop its collections in line with the University's teaching and research interests. The library of the royal physician to Queen Charlotte, William Hunter, received in 1807, comprised some 10,000 volumes that augmented the library's holdings by fifty per cent, and extended their reach well beyond the contemporary curriculum; of Hunter's 650 manuscript codices, over a hundred are illuminated, and his incunabula "accorded Glasgow a prominence that it could not have achieved with its own resources".

By 1888 the holdings of the Library had risen to around 150,000 volumes, due in part to large donations and contributions by wealthy private collectors, such as William Hunter, John Smith of Crutherland, George Arnott Walker Arnott, William Euing and David Murray.

Following the considerable expansion of the university buildings in the 1630s onwards, the first purpose-built Library for the university was designed by William Adam and opened in 1744 at the Old College in High Street. From 1870 until 1968, the University Library was housed within the main Gilbert Scott Building in Gilmorehill. The old Library closed in July 1968 and the new building opened to readers on 30 September 1968.

== Current building ==
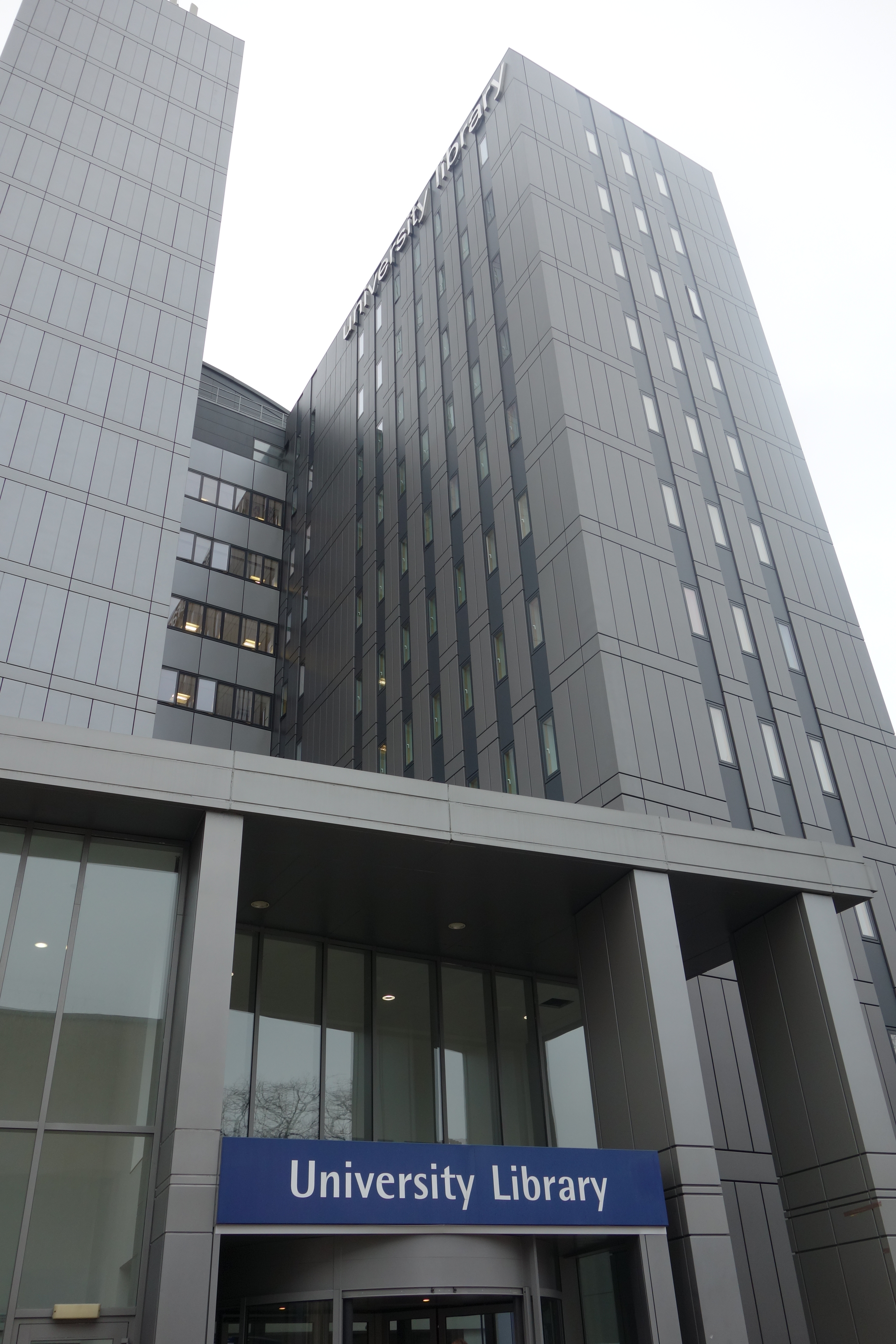
Entrance of the Library (2017)

Designed by William Whitfield, the present 12-storey library was constructed in 1968 and extended in the 1980s and 1990s. It formed the centerpiece of the new campus buildings built across Hillhead during the 1960s. In line with architectural fashion of the period (Edinburgh University Library opened its new eight storey main library in a similar style in 1967), it is of Brutalist design, being clad in Precast concrete flint aggregate panels. (However, as of 2012, the building was overclad in an "aluminum rain screen system" due to deterioration of the original panels.) The main library floors are stacked in a central core with the peripheral towers containing services. The cluster of towers are reminiscent of San Gimignano, and form part of a complex that also incorporates the Hunterian Art Gallery. The original building has been extensively refurbished to facilitate a modern information technology environment. The library has collections ranging from astronomy to zoology, as well as a world-class Special Collections department. Special Collections on level 12 has an internationally significant collection of manuscripts and printed works. In the foyer, there is a display area featuring changing exhibitions of rare material from their collections. In 1993 the Glasgow University Library complex was selected by the international conservation organisation DoCoMoMo as one of sixty key Scottish monuments of the post-war era.

Open 361 days of the year, the library provides a resource not only for the academic community in Glasgow but also for scholars worldwide. There are study spaces for more than 2500 students, with over 800 computers. Wi-Fi access is available throughout the building. A new cafe and social learning space was opened in 2009, followed by an exhibition gallery, and a level dedicated to post-graduate study. In 2016 the main entrance level was totally reconstructed in an open configuration, including a new Conservation Studio, and at the same time, the basement area has been reformed to become a further study area.

The library staff comprises a team of over three hundred daytime, evening, and weekend staff. The University Librarian from 1 August 2015 is Susan Ashworth. The Friends of Glasgow University Library, an educational charity formed in 1976, is open to public membership, promotes the Library and its work, and each year presents a series of talks and events. The first fully illustrated account of the Library and its unique and distinctive collections, from 1451 to the present day, "The University of Glasgow Library: Friendly Shelves" was published in June 2016, with Forewords by The Chancellor Professor Sir Kenneth Calman and the Principal Anton Muscatelli.

== Notable collections ==
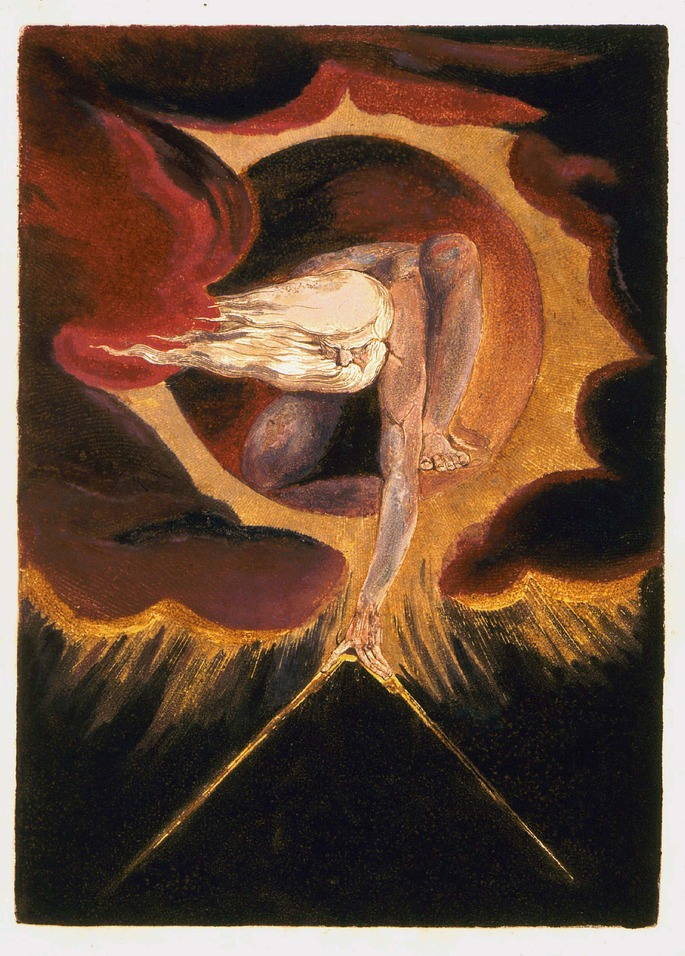
The Ancient of Days, Copy B, in Europe a Prophecy by William Blake (1794)

The Library incorporates the Archives of the University of Glasgow accumulated since 1451, and the Scottish Business Archive of internationally important collections of business records covering the whole of Scotland and its global trades from the 18th century to the present.

The Library's Special Collections are classed as being of national and international importance. Its subject strengths include art, languages, literature, history, and the history of law, science, and medicine, represented by over 200,000 manuscript items and around 200,000 printed works (1,060 of which are incunabula, printed before 1501.) The holdings of medieval and renaissance manuscripts, and emblem literature, are of international status. Collections include those of George Buchanan from 1578, the Hunterian Library, the Stirling Maxwell Collection including emblem literature from 1531 onwards, the James McNeill Whistler Archive, the Euing Collection of music and Bibles, the Dougan Collection of early photography including Hill & Adamson, the modern Edwin Morgan Scrapbooks and the Scottish Theatre Archive.

The library is the only European Documentation Centre (EDC) in the west of Scotland, and one of the largest in the UK. The EDC is part of the Maps, Official Publications, and Statistics Unit on Level 7. The centre contains full texts of legislation and proposed legislation, as well as reports and statistics from the European Union.

Specialist collections for veterinary medicine, dentistry, and chemistry are held in separate branch libraries around campus. Other notable collections include music scores, Russian and East European material, and significant 18th- and 19th-century print books and journals at the Library Research Annexe. The 2015 public exhibition in the adjacent Hunterian Art Gallery, Ingenious Impressions -The Coming of the Book, showcased the incunabula collection. A web catalogue of these rarities has been created.

== See also ==
- Papyrus 22
- Hunterian Collection
