= William Hunter (anatomist) =

Scottish physician (1718–1783)

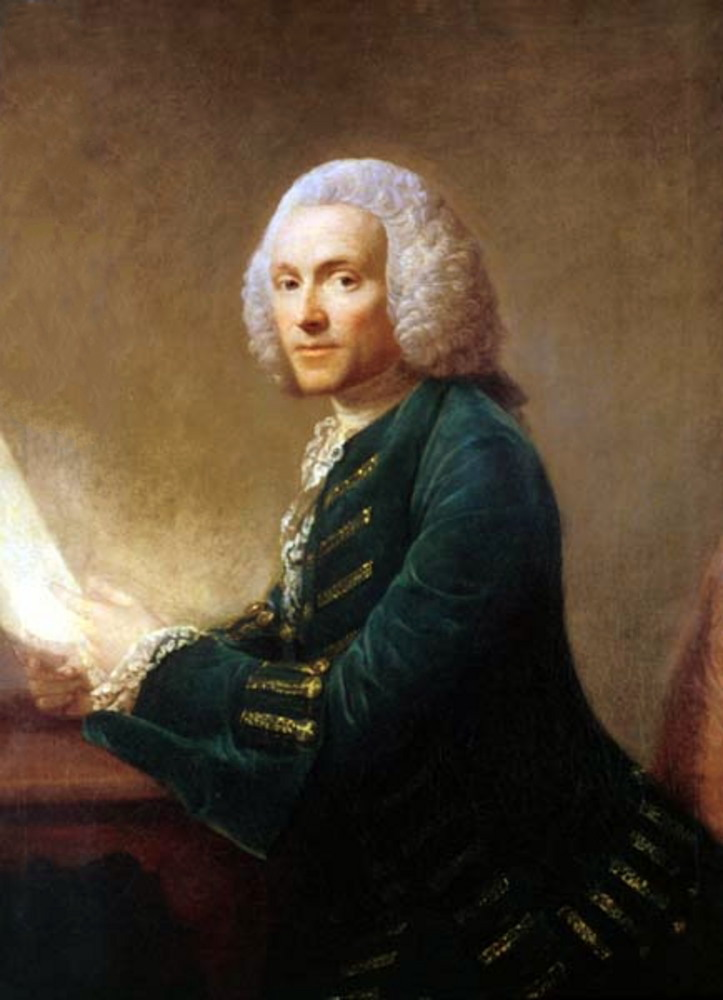
- Portrait by Allan Ramsay, 1764–1765
- Born: 23 May 1718; East Kilbride, Scotland
- Died: 30 March 1783 (aged 64); London, England
- Education: University of Glasgow; University of Edinburgh
- Scientific career
- Fields: Anatomy, obstetrics

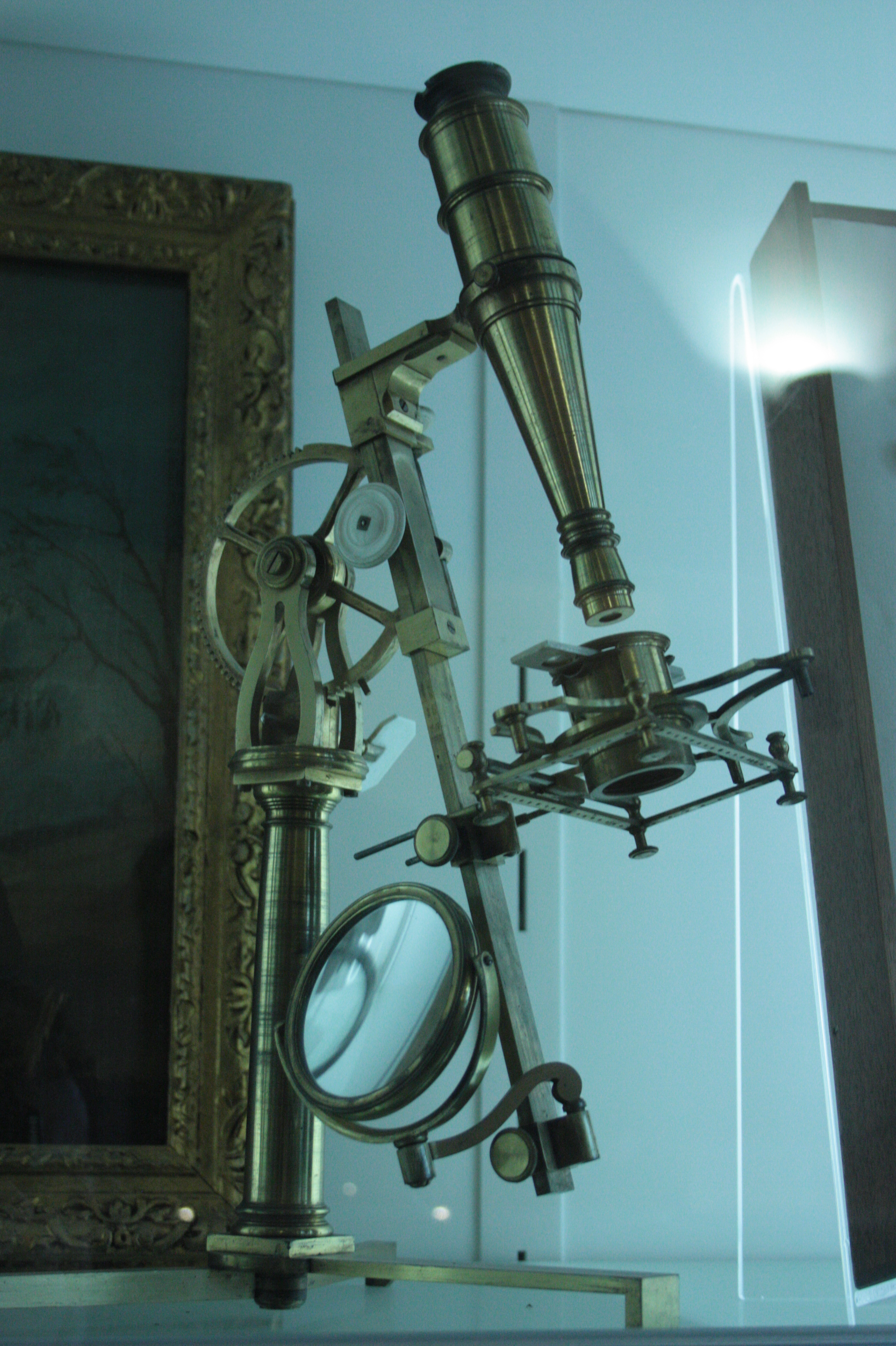
William Hunter's microscope, Hunterian Museum, Glasgow

William Hunter FRS (23 May 1718 – 30 March 1783) was a Scottish anatomist and physician. He was a leading teacher of anatomy, and the outstanding obstetrician of his day. His guidance and training of his equally famous brother, John Hunter, was also of great importance.

== Early life and career ==
William Hunter was born at Long Calderwood, now a part of East Kilbride, South Lanarkshire, to Agnes Paul (c. 1685–1751) and John Hunter (1662/3–1741). He was the elder brother of the surgeon John Hunter. After studying divinity at the University of Glasgow, he went into medicine in 1737, studying under William Cullen.

Arriving in London, Hunter became resident pupil to William Smellie (1741–44) and he was trained in anatomy at St George's Hospital, London, specialising in obstetrics. He followed the example of Smellie in giving a private course on dissecting, operative procedures and bandaging, from 1746. His courtly manners and sensible judgement helped him to advance until he became the leading obstetric consultant of London. Unlike Smellie, he did not favour the use of forceps in delivery. Stephen Paget said of him:

He never married; he had no country house; he looks, in his portraits, a fastidious, fine gentleman; but he worked till he dropped and he lectured when he was dying.

To orthopaedic surgeons he is famous for his studies on bone and cartilage. In 1743 he published the paper On the structure and diseases of articulating cartilages – which is often cited – especially the following sentence: "If we consult the standard Chirurgical Writers from Hippocrates down to the present Age, we shall find, that an ulcerated Cartilage is universally allowed to be a very troublesome Disease; that it admits of a Cure with more Difficulty than carious Bone; and that, when destroyed, it is not recovered".

== Later career ==
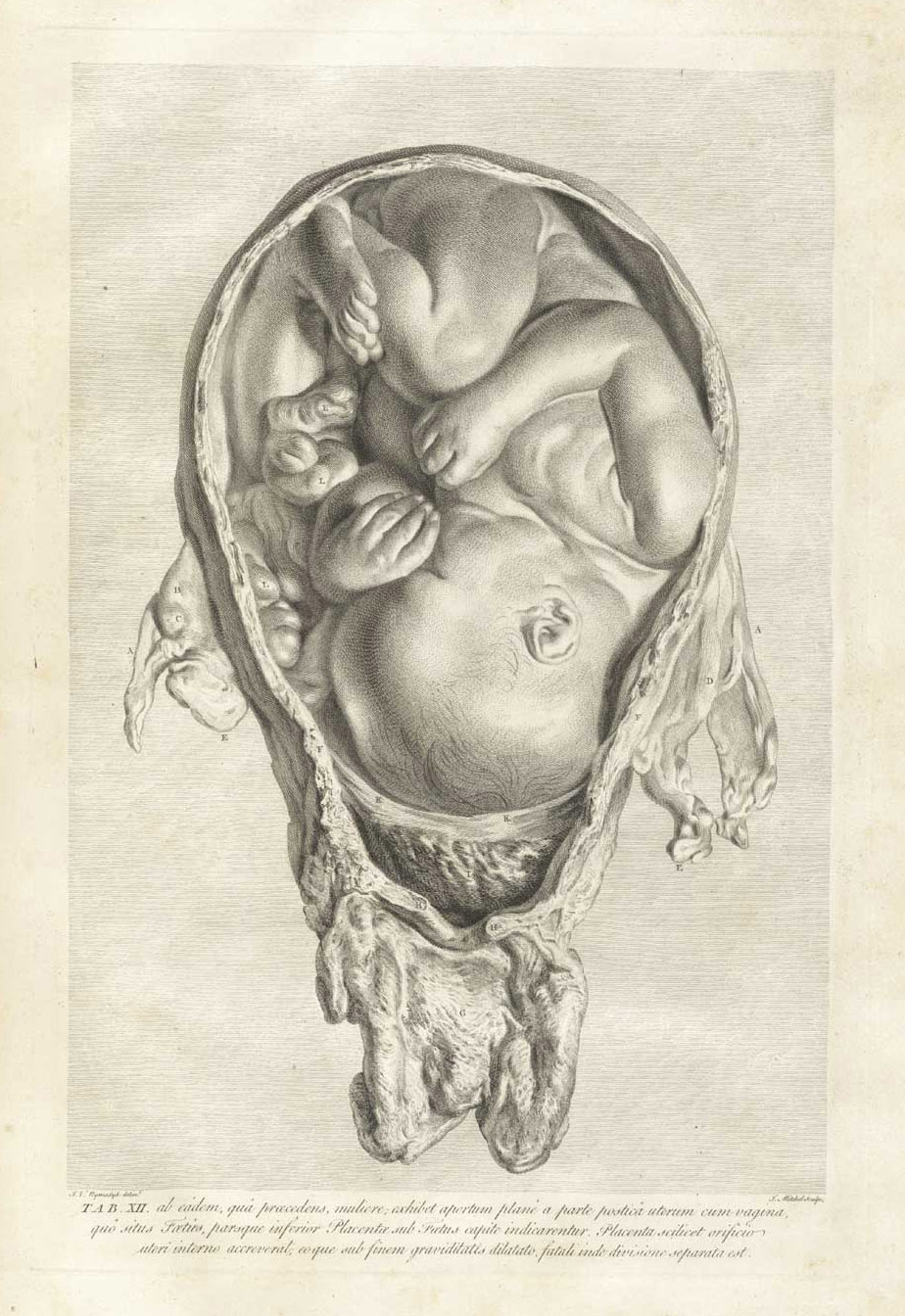
Page from The Anatomy of the Human Gravid Uterus Exhibited in Figures

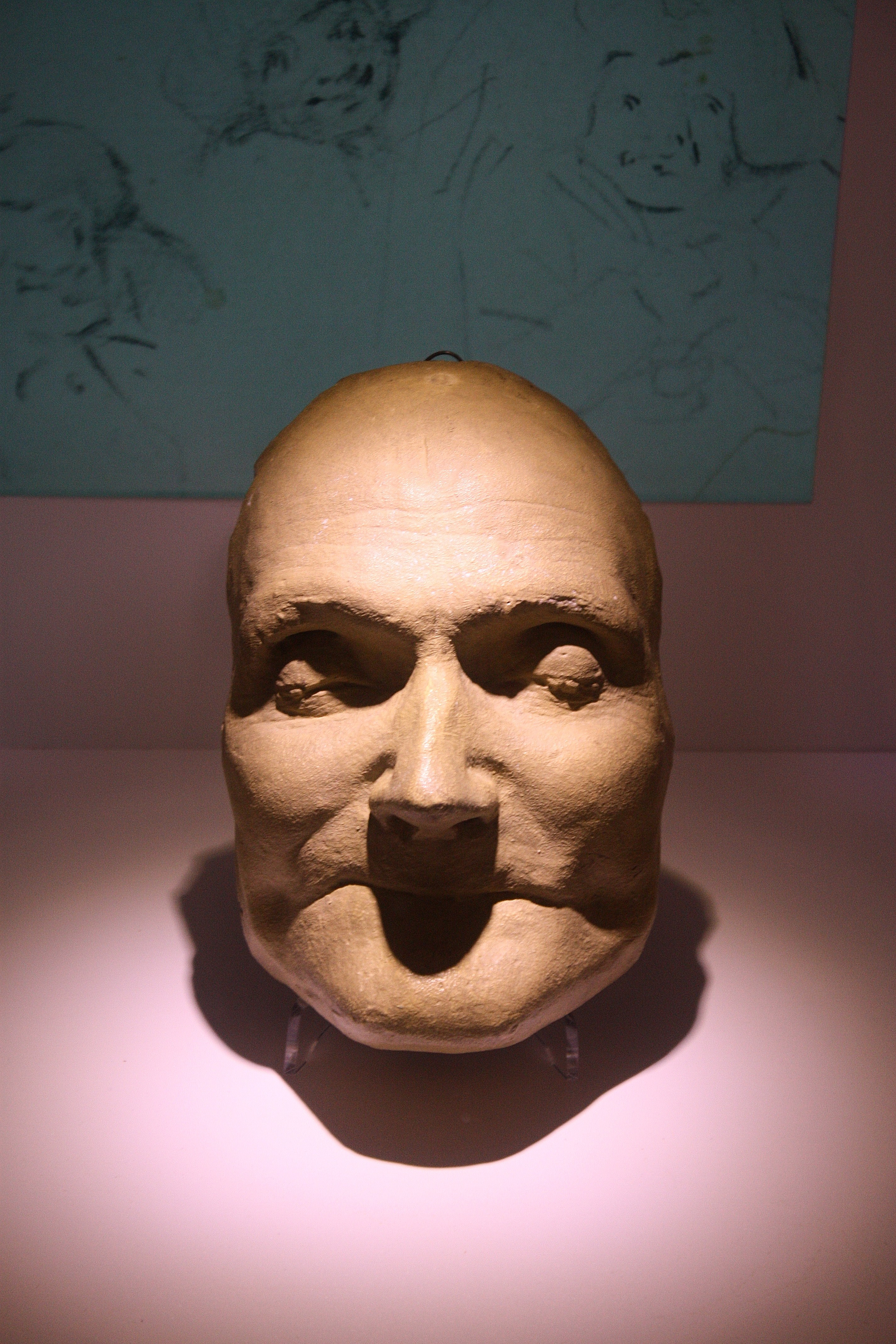
Plaster cast death mask, made several hours after his death. Hunterian Museum and Art Gallery, Glasgow, Scotland.

In 1764, he became physician to Queen Charlotte. He was elected a Fellow of the Royal Society in 1767 and Professor of Anatomy to the Royal Academy in 1768.

In 1768 he built the famous anatomy theatre and museum in Great Windmill Street, Soho, where the best British anatomists and surgeons of the period were trained. His greatest work was Anatomia uteri umani gravidi [The anatomy of the human gravid uterus exhibited in figures] (1774), with plates engraved by Rymsdyk (1730–90), and published by the Baskerville Press. He chose as a model for clear, precise but schematic illustration of anatomic dissections the drawings by Leonardo da Vinci conserved in the Royal Collection at Windsor: Kenneth Clark considered him responsible for the 18th century rediscovery of Leonardo's drawings in England. He praised them highly in his lectures and planned to publish them with his own commentary, but never had the time for the project before his death.

To aid his teaching of dissection, in 1775 Hunter commissioned sculptor Agostino Carlini to make a cast of the flayed but muscular corpse of a recently executed criminal, a smuggler. He was professor of anatomy at the Royal Academy of Arts in London from 1769 until 1772. He was interested in arts, and had strong connections to the artistic world.

== An avid collector ==
Around 1765 William Hunter started collecting widely across a range of themes beyond medicine and anatomy: books, manuscripts, prints, coins, shells, zoological specimens, and minerals. In several of these areas, he worked closely with specialists, such as Johan Christian Fabricius, and George Fordyce who used his collections as tools for new biological and chemical science. He bequeathed his collections, plus a large sum to build a museum, to the University of Glasgow. The collections survive today as the nucleus of the University of Glasgow's Hunterian Museum and Art Gallery, while his library and archives are now held in the university's library.

Hunter's coin collection was especially fine, and the Hunter Coin Cabinet in the Hunterian Museum is one of the world's great numismatic collections. According to the Preface of Catalogue of Greek Coins in the Hunterian Collection (Macdonald 1899), Hunter purchased many important collections, including those of Horace Walpole and the bibliophile Thomas Crofts. King George III even donated an Athenian gold piece on 7 April of 1774.

When the famous book collection of Anthony Askew, the Bibliotheca Askeviana, was auctioned off upon Askew's death in 1774, Hunter purchased many significant volumes in the face of stiff competition from the British Museum.

He died in London in 1783, aged 64, and was buried at St James's, Piccadilly. A memorial to him lies in the church.

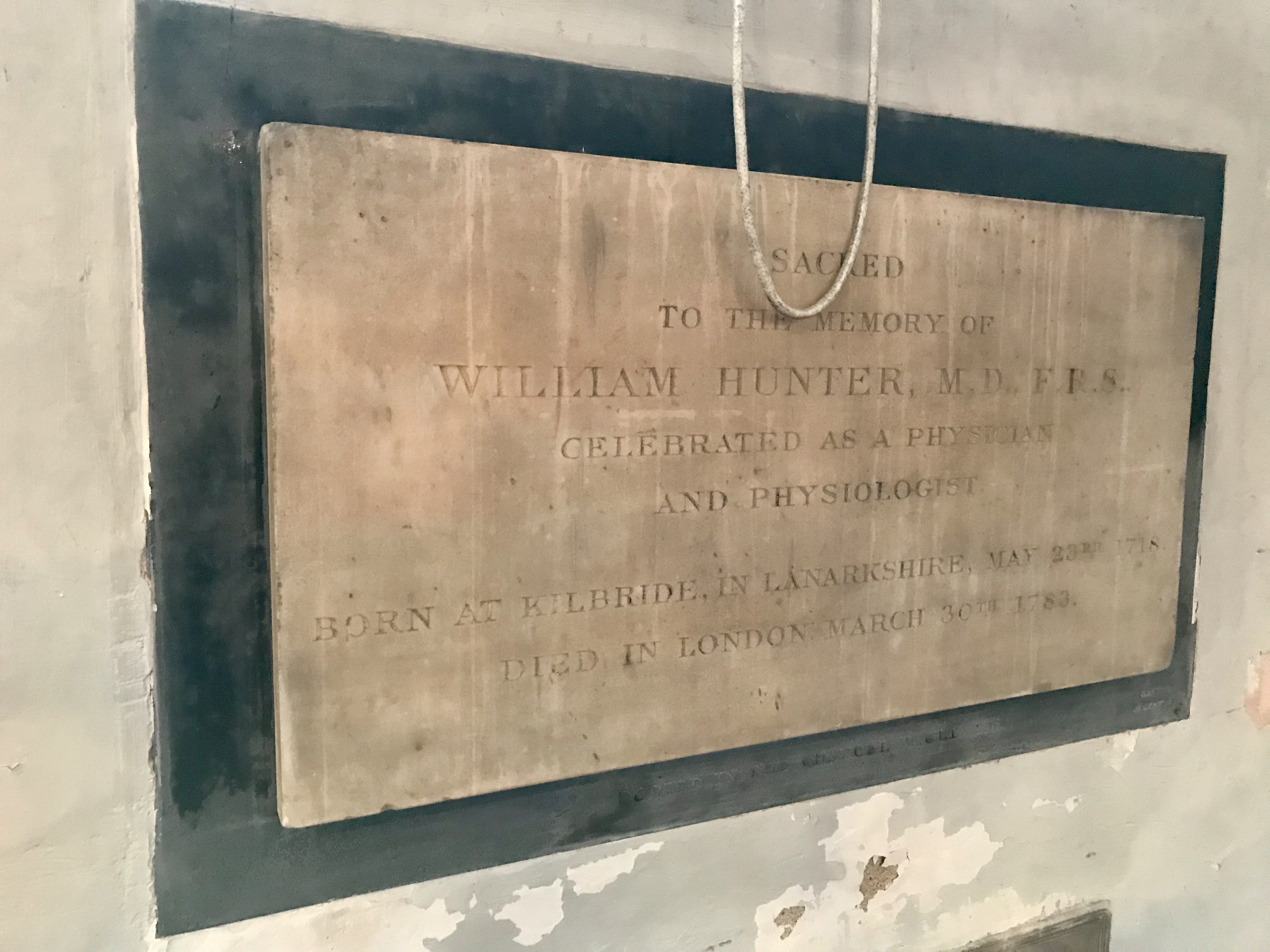
A memorial to William Hunter in St James's Church, Piccadilly.

== Controversy ==
In 2010, the self-described historian Don Shelton made some lurid claims about the methods by which Hunter, his brother John, and his teacher and competitor William Smellie might have obtained bodies for their anatomical work. In a non-peer-reviewed opinion piece in the Journal of the Royal Society of Medicine he suggested that the two physicians committed multiple murders of pregnant women in order to gain access to corpses for anatomical dissection and physiological experimentation. He suggested that there was an inadequate match between supply and demand of pregnant corpses and that the two physicians must have commissioned many murders in order to carry out their work.

Shelton's comments attracted media publicity, but were heavily criticised on factual and methodological grounds by medical historians, who pointed out that in 1761, Peter Camper had indicated that figures "were not all from real life", and likely methods other than murder were available to obtain bodies of recently deceased pregnant women at that time. Hunter also provided case histories for at least four of the subjects illustrated in The Anatomy of the Gravid Uterus Exhibited in Figures, published in 1774. A recent review of Hunter's sources of anatomical specimens was published in 2015. That "multiple methods of preservation were combined" at Hunter's Great Windmill Street school in order to retain as much information from the individual cadavers as possible further indicates the rarity and value of these bodies.

Helen King indicated that the over-enthusiastic response of the media and the internet to Shelton's unreviewed speculations raised fresh questions about how medical history is generated, presented and evaluated in the media and, in particular, on the internet.

== See also ==
- Hunterian Museum and Art Gallery
- Hunterian Collection
- Hunter House Museum, his birthplace
