= The Death of Chatterton =

Painting by Henry Wallis

External videos
- Wallis's Chatterton, Smarthistory

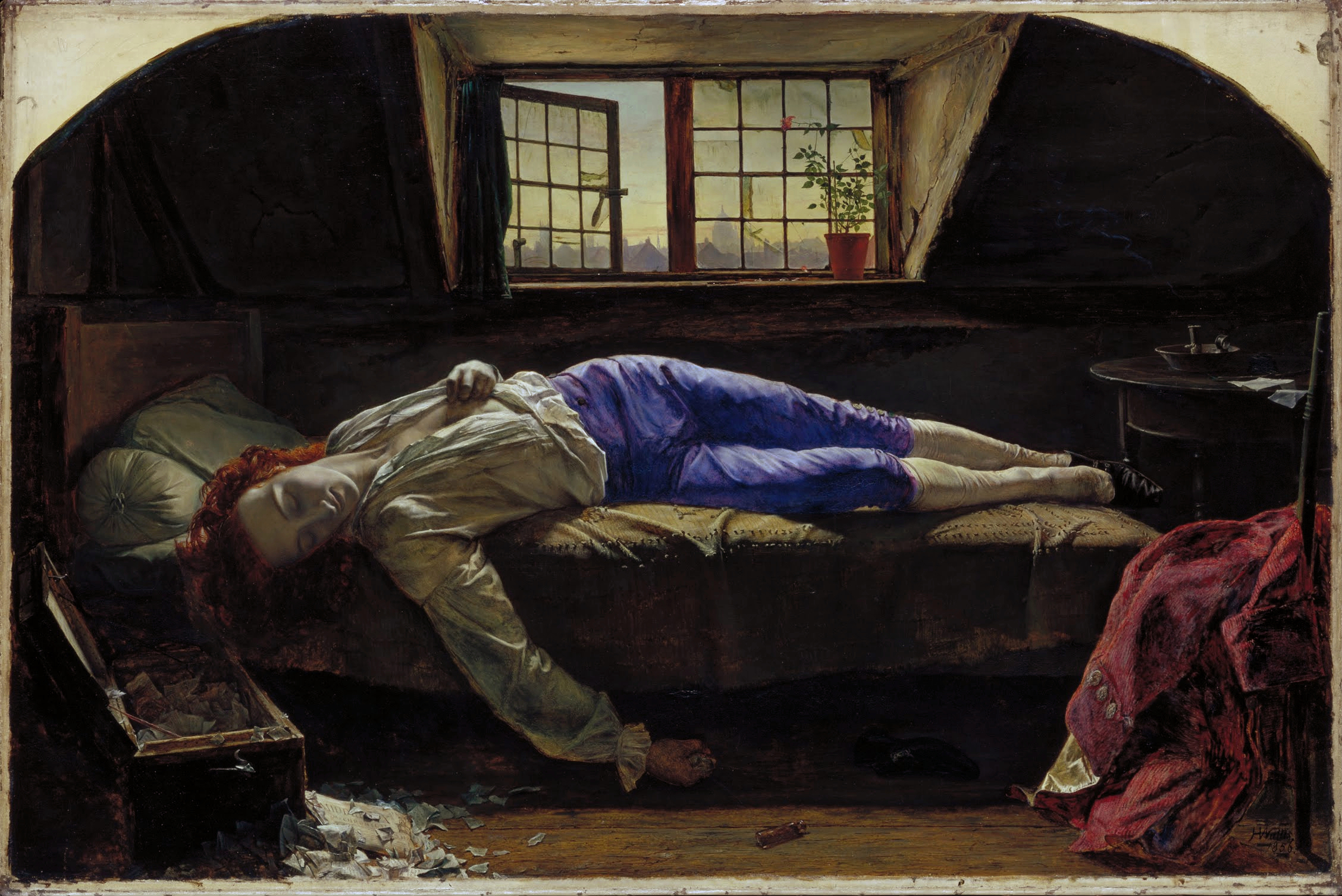
The Death of Chatterton by Henry Wallis, Tate version

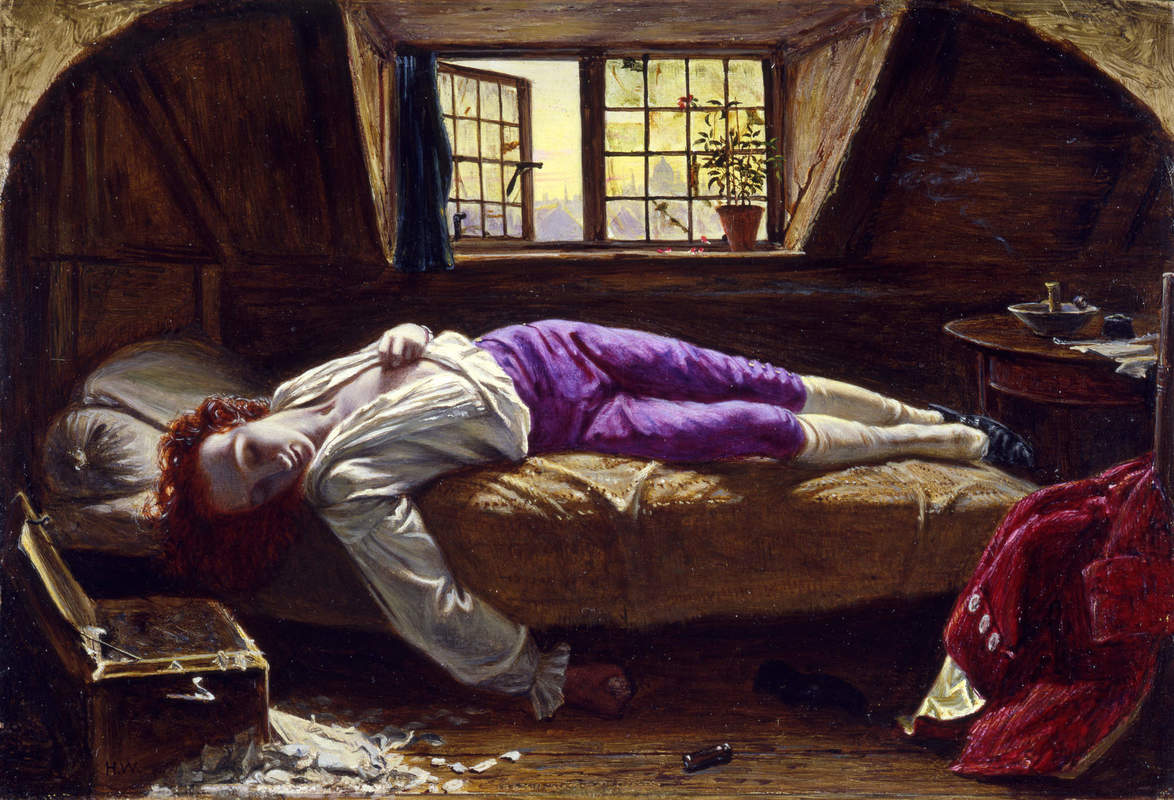
The Death of Chatterton by Henry Wallis, Birmingham version

The Death of Chatterton is an oil painting on canvas, by the English Pre-Raphaelite painter Henry Wallis (1830–1916), now in Tate Britain, London. Two smaller versions, sketches or replicas, are possessed by the Birmingham Museum and Art Gallery and the Yale Center for British Art. The Tate painting measures 62.2 centimetres (24.5 in) by 93.3 centimetres (36.7 in), and was completed during 1856.

== The painting ==
The subject of the painting was the 17-year-old English early Romantic poet Thomas Chatterton (1752–1770), shown dead after he had poisoned himself with arsenic in 1770. Chatterton was considered a Romantic hero for many young and struggling artists in Wallis's time.

Wallis's Chatterton reveals his association with the Pre-Raphaelite style, seen in the vibrant colours and careful build-up of symbolic detail. He used a bold colour scheme with a contrasting palette and he exploited the fall of the natural light through the window of the garret to implement his much loved style at the time, chiaroscuro. Wallis painted the work in a friend's chamber in Gray's Inn, with St Paul's Cathedral visible on the skyline through the window. It was probably a coincidence that this location was close to the garret in Brooke Street where Chatterton had died 86 years before. The model used for the painting was the young George Meredith, a 19th-century English novelist and poet.

The painting was Wallis's first exhibited work. It was shown at the Royal Academy summer exhibition in 1856, with a quotation from the Tragedy of Doctor Faustus by Christopher Marlowe inscribed on the frame: "Cut is the branch that might have grown full straight, And burned is Apollo's laurel bough". It was an immediate success, with John Ruskin describing it as "faultless and wonderful". It drew large crowds at the Art Treasures Exhibition in Manchester in 1857, was also exhibited in Dublin in 1859, and was one of the most popular paintings of the 19th century in reproductive print form.

Wallis sold the painting to Augustus Egg in 1856, and Egg sold the right to make engraved reproductions. The painting became the subject of a court case after Dublin photographer James Robinson was inspired to recreate the painting as a tableau vivant so he could sell photographs of the scene. The painting was left to the Tate Gallery by Charles Gent Clement in 1899.

There are two smaller versions of the same subject by Wallis, one either a study or a replica in the Birmingham Museum and Art Gallery, which measures 17.3 centimetres (6.8 in) by 25.25 centimetres (9.94 in) and, somewhat unusually for the period, a small oil-on-panel replica at the Yale Center for British Art, which measures 22.7 centimetres (8.9 in) by 30.2 centimetres (11.9 in). The Birmingham work was sold at Christie's in 1875 to Baron Albert Grant and then in 1877 to William Kendrick, who donated it to the gallery in 1918.

== In popular culture ==
The main singer of the group Feu! Chatterton said that he was inspired by this painting for the name of the group.

The painting is quoted in Stanley Kubrick's 1975 film Barry Lyndon in a scene where the titular protagonist, wounded in a duel, convalesces at a country inn.

The painting features, and then acts as a central motif, in the film Love and Death on Long Island.

Babyshambles' second album, Shotter's Nation, features this artwork on the album cover.

The painting is a central motif in Peter Ackroyd's novel Chatterton (1987), and an adapted version of it is reproduced on the book's cover.

Afsky's debut album, Sorg, features this artwork on the album cover.
