= Juniore =

French indie pop band

Juniore is a French indie pop band formed in Paris in 2013. The group is led by singer/songwriter Anna Jean, daughter of 2008 Nobel Prize in Literature J.M.G. Le Clézio. The band's musical style is influenced by the music of the 1960s; the website AllMusic describes their music as mixing "modern indie pop sensibilities with elements of retro French pop, dark, twangy surf guitar, and a vocal style that falls somewhere between Cat Power and Françoise Hardy." Jean had previously appeared in the duo Domingo and featured on the Bot’Ox track "Blue Steel". The band's debut album, Ouh là là, is released on Le Phonographe, a label that Jean founded with Samy Osta, who is also the producer of albums by La Femme and Feu! Chatterton. The second album features Samy Osta (guitars, production) and Swanny Elzingre (drums).

Their song "Ah Bah D'accord" from their album "Un, Deux, Trois" featured in a 2021 "Live Happy" commercial for the TUI Group travel company.

== Discography ==
Album

- Ouh là là (2017)
- Un, Deux, Trois (2020)
- Trois, Deux, Un (2024)

Compilation album

- Juniore (2016)

Extended play

- Marabout (2015)

Singles

- "Christine"/"Dans le noir" (2013)
- "La fin du monde" (2014)
- "Marabout" (2015)
- "Panique" (2017)
