= William Barrett (antiquarian) =

English surgeon and antiquary

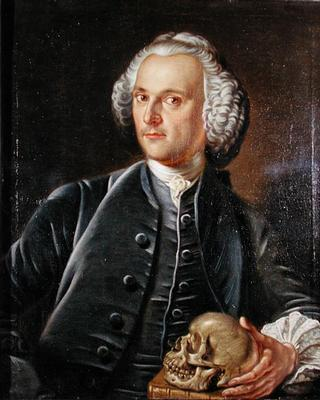
- William Barrett, 1764 portrait by Jan van Rymsdyk
- Born: 1733
- Died: 1789 (aged 55–56)

William Barrett (1733–1789) was an English surgeon and antiquary.

== Life ==
He was born early in 1733 at Notton, Wiltshire. He passed his examination as a surgeon on 19 February 1755, and settled in Bristol in practice of his profession. On 9 November 1775 he became a Fellow of the Society of Antiquaries. On 13 October 1789 he died at High Ham, Somerset.

== Works ==
His History and Antiquities of Bristol was announced early: an engraving of him, by William Walker, from a portrait by Jan van Rymsdyk, ‘ætatis 31’ (i.e. in 1764), was issued 25 years before the book itself was printed. and he is there described as ‘William Barrett, Surgeon and Author of the "History and Antiquities of Bristol."’ In his research, though acquaintances of his such as Catcott and Burgum, the pewterers, he met Thomas Chatterton the forger. He accepted all the youth's statements, and Chatterton produced many documents for him. In 1788, he put out his proposals for the publication of his History by subscription. Many of Chatterton's fabrications did make their way into his History (1789) when it finally came out long after the forger had died, damaging Barrett's reputation severely.

After Barrett's death the antiquarian forgeries of Chatterton passed to the British Museum, via Robert Glynn.

== Bibliography ==
- Barrett, William (1789). The History and Antiquities of the City of Bristol. Bristol: William Pine.
- Bettey, Joseph (2003). The First Historians of Bristol: William Barrett and Samuel Seyer. Bristol: Bristol Historical Association.
