= Robert Glynn =

British physician (1719–1800)

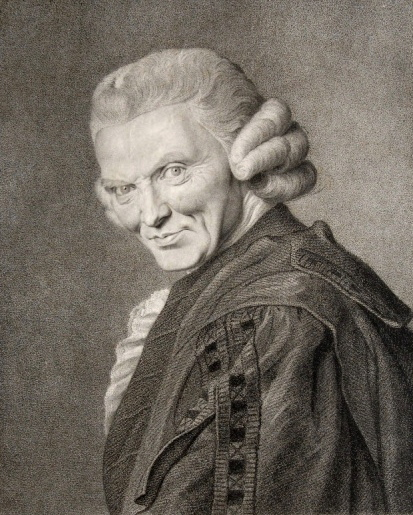
Robert Glynn

Robert Glynn, afterwards Clobery (5 August 1719 – 6 February 1800) was an English physician, known as a generous eccentric.

== Life ==
Glynn was the eldest and only surviving son of Robert Glynn of Brodes in Helland parish, near Bodmin, Cornwall, who married Lucy, daughter of John Clobery of Bradstone, Devon, was born at Brodes on 5 August and baptised at Helland Church on 16 September 1719. After some teaching from a curate named Whiston, he was placed on the foundation at Eton College. In 1737 he was elected scholar of King's College, Cambridge, where he took the degrees of B.A. 1741, M.A. 1745, and M.D. 1752, and became a Fellow. His medical tutor at Cambridge was the elder William Heberden of St John's College. Glynn himself announced in March 1751 a course of lectures at King's College on the medical institutes, and next year gave a second course on anatomy. For a short time he practised at Richmond, Surrey, but soon returned to Cambridge, and never again left the university.

On 5 April 1762 he was admitted a candidate, and on 28 March 1763 became a fellow, of the College of Physicians in London. William Pitt the Younger, whom he had attended in the autumn of 1773, offered him in 1793 the professorial chair of medicine at Cambridge, which Glynn refused. He was at the close of his life the acknowledged local head of his profession, and his medical services were in great repute at Ely, where he attended every week.

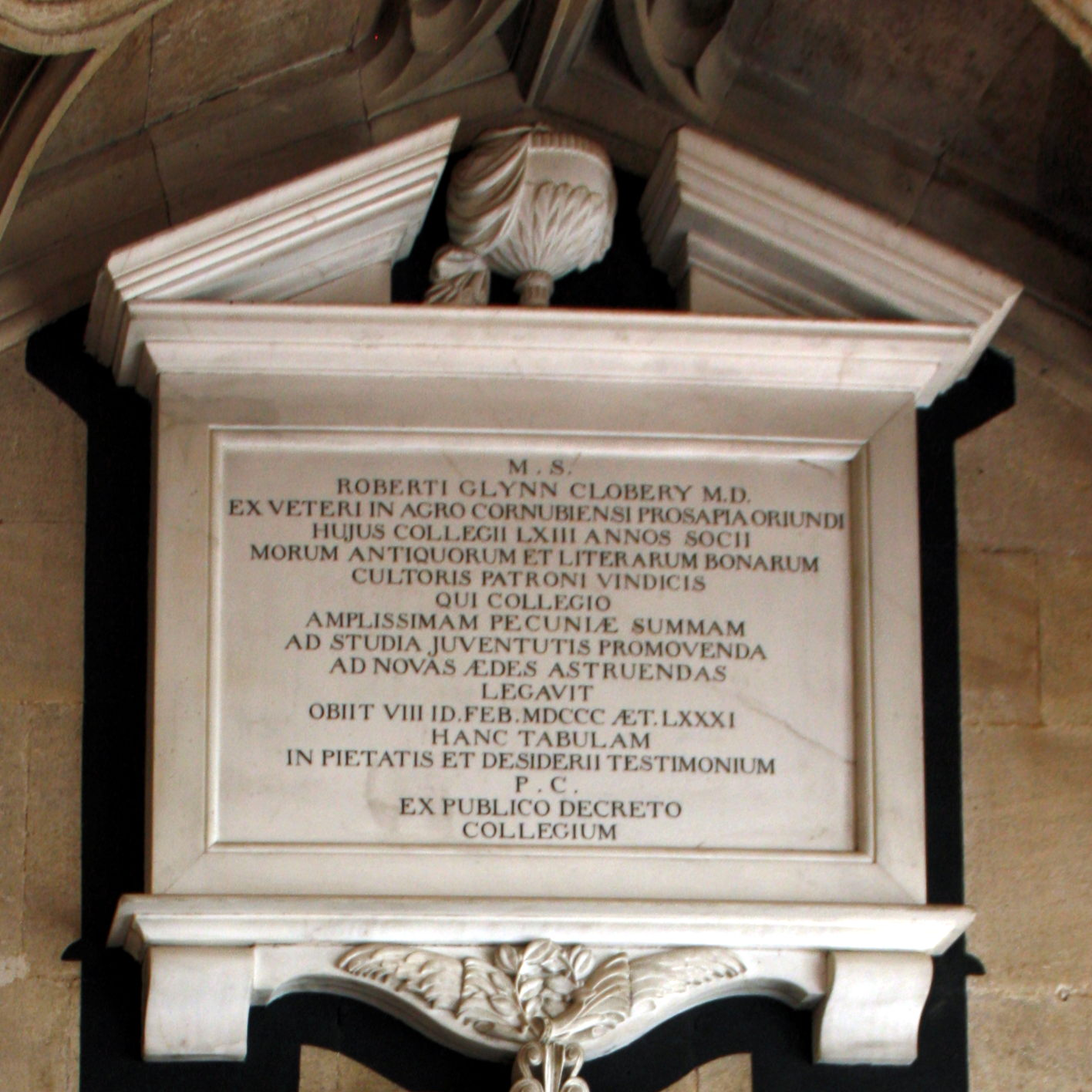
Commemorative plaque to Robert Glynn in King's College Chapel.

Late in life Glynn inherited a considerable property from a maternal uncle, and with it took the name of Clobery. He died in his rooms in King's College, Cambridge, on 6 February 1800, and, according to his own direction, was buried in the vault of the college chapel by torchlight, between the hours of ten and eleven at night on 13 February, in the presence of members of the college only. A tablet to his memory was placed in King's College Chapel, in a small oratory on the right hand after entering its south door.

== Legacy ==
Though he was in good practice and lived economically as a fellow, Glynn was generous rather than rich. He left his lands in Holland to the Rev. John Henry Jacob, sometime a fellow of King's College, and son of John Jacob of Salisbury, M.D., a particular friend. The college received a legacy in stock; it was mainly expended on buildings erected under superintendence of William Wilkins the architect around 1825–30; with a prize of £20 a year divided between two scholars. To the Rev. Thomas Kerrich of Magdalene College, Cambridge, his friend and executor, he bequeathed £5,000. His portrait was drawn by Kerrich, and engraved by J. G. and G. S. Facius in 1783. His library was sold in 1800.

== Reputation ==
Glynn was eccentric in manner and dress. George Pryme describes him as usually wearing 'a scarlet cloak and three-cornered hat; he carried a gold-headed cane. He also used pattens in rainy weather.' Another contemporary, Sir Egerton Brydges, records the doctor's pride "on saying whatever came uppermost into his mind". His tea parties were famous, and frequented by many undergraduates. As a physician he showed judgment and attention, but with characteristic eccentricity he almost invariably ordered a blister. He resolutely refrained from prescribing opium, cathartics, or bleeding. He recommended and practised an open air life.

He was friendly with William Mason, and attended Thomas Gray in his last illness; Glynn's initial noncommittal diagnosis of "gout of the stomach" missed terminal uremia. He returned with Russell Plumptre, the Regius Professor of Physic, a medical associate and friend, but could do nothing. Richard Watson was one of his patients in 1781, when he gave his opinion that recovery was hopeless; Watson lived on to 1816. He gave free advice to patients from the Fens, and would take no fees from Cornishmen or Etonians. His kindness to one of his poor patients was celebrated by a younger son of Henry Plumptre, president of Queens' College, in verses called Benevolus and the Magpie. An anecdote imputing inhumanity to him is in Samuel Parr's Works.

Three letters from Glynn to George Hardinge are in John Nichols's Illustrations of Literature. William Wadd in his Nugæ Chirurgicæ quotes a poetical jeu d'esprit on Glynn as a physician. Horace Walpole called him in 1792 "an old doting physician and Chattertonian at Cambridge," and professed to believe that some falsehoods current about himself had been invented or disseminated by Glynn.

== Verse ==
In 1757 Glynn competed successfully for the Seatonian Prize out of dislike for a certain Bally, who gained the same prize in 1756 and 1758; it was insinuated that he was not the author of his own poem. His poem of The Day of Judgement was printed at Cambridge in 1757, 2nd edit. 1757, 3rd edit. 1758, and again in 1800. It was included in the various impressions of the Musæ Seatonianæ, Richard Alfred Davenport's Poets, vol. lviii., Thomas Park's Poets, vol. xxxiii., and in similar publications. Some stanzas by him beginning "Tease me no more" appeared in the General Evening Post, 23 April 1789, and were reprinted in the Poetical Register for 1802, and Henry John Wale's My Grandfather's Pocket-Book.

== On Chatterton ==
Glynn believed in the authenticity of the forged "Rowley poems" published by Thomas Chatterton, and his faith was confirmed by a visit to Bristol in 1778. The Latin letter introduced by William Barrett into his history of Bristol is said to have been written by Glynn, and on Barrett's death the original forgeries by Chatterton were presented to him. Glynn bequeathed them to the British Museum, and they are now part of the British Library's manuscript collection as Add MS 5766 A-C. He had a bitter quarrel with George Steevens over these manuscripts.

Glynn is said to have given scholarly input to the essay by Thomas James Mathias in the Chatterton controversy, and he is referred to with respect in Mathias's Pursuits of Literature. Gilbert Wakefield used to say (according to Samuel Rogers) that both Thomas Rennell and Glynn assisted Mathias in this satire.
