= Arthur Teboul =

French singer (born 1987)

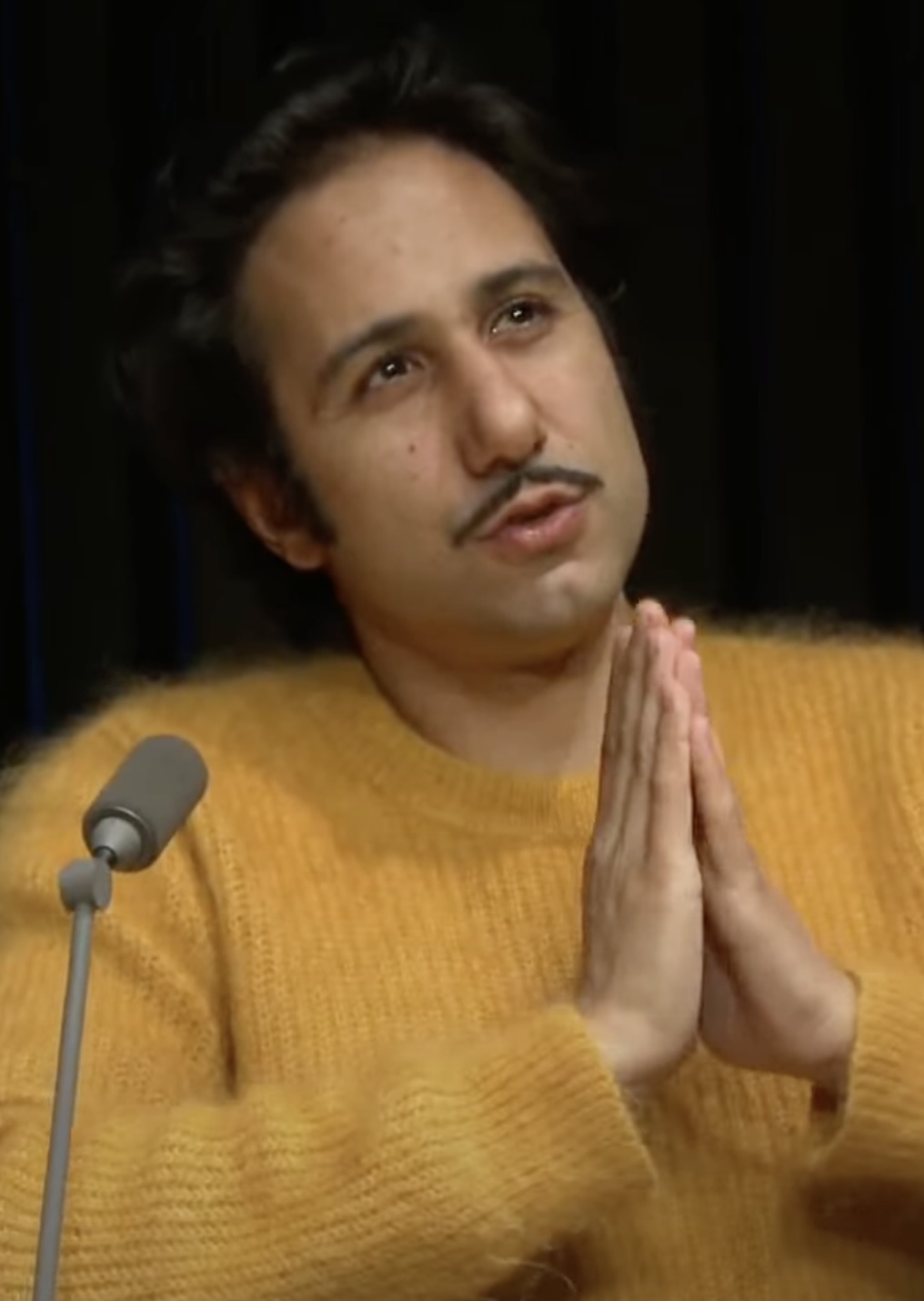
- Teboul in 2024

Background information
- Born: 28 November 1987 (age 38); Paris, France
- Origin: France
- Genres: Rock
- Occupations: Singer, songwriter
- Years active: 2011–present

Arthur Teboul (born 28 November 1987) is a French singer-songwriter and co-founder of the French rock band Feu! Chatterton. He has released several albums with his group. They achieved mainstream success in France in 2021 with their album Palais d'argile.

== Career ==
Teboul was born in Paris in 1987. His parents are Sephardic Jews. They are both executives in corporate communications, both from immigrant backgrounds, originally from Algeria and Morocco. He grew up in a loving family with two brothers, Jules who became a lawyer and Sacha who studied at an art school. He stated: "my Jewish identity is very important to me". His grandparents were important role models.

He met Sebastien Wolf, with whom he would form the band Feu! Chatterton in his early twenties, when arriving at a new school Lycée Louis-le-Grand. After becoming friends with several future members of his band between 14 and 18, he went to a business school. He reconnected with his friends because there was a lot of free time. After forming the band Feu! Chatterton, he began working with his father who became the designer the album covers, posters and visuals for websites.

Their debut album Ici le Jour (a tout enseveli) received critical acclaim in 2015. He has since released three other studio albums with his band, L'Oiseleur (fr) (2018), Palais d'argile (2021) and Labyrinthe (2025). Palais d'argile achieved platinum status in France with 100,000 sold copies.

== Personal life ==
He is married with interior decorator Mégane Servadio - she created Etttore agency with Stéphanie Darmon. Teboul lives in Paris in a flat with a view to the Père Lachaise trees. Teboul is the father of a girl born in 2023.

== Discography ==
=== Studio albums with Feu! Chatterton ===
- Ici le Jour (a tout enseveli) (fr) (2015)
- L'Oiseleur (fr) (2018)
- Palais d'argile (2021)
- Labyrinthe (2025)
