= Henry Wallis =

English Pre-Raphaelite painter, writer and collector (1830–1916)

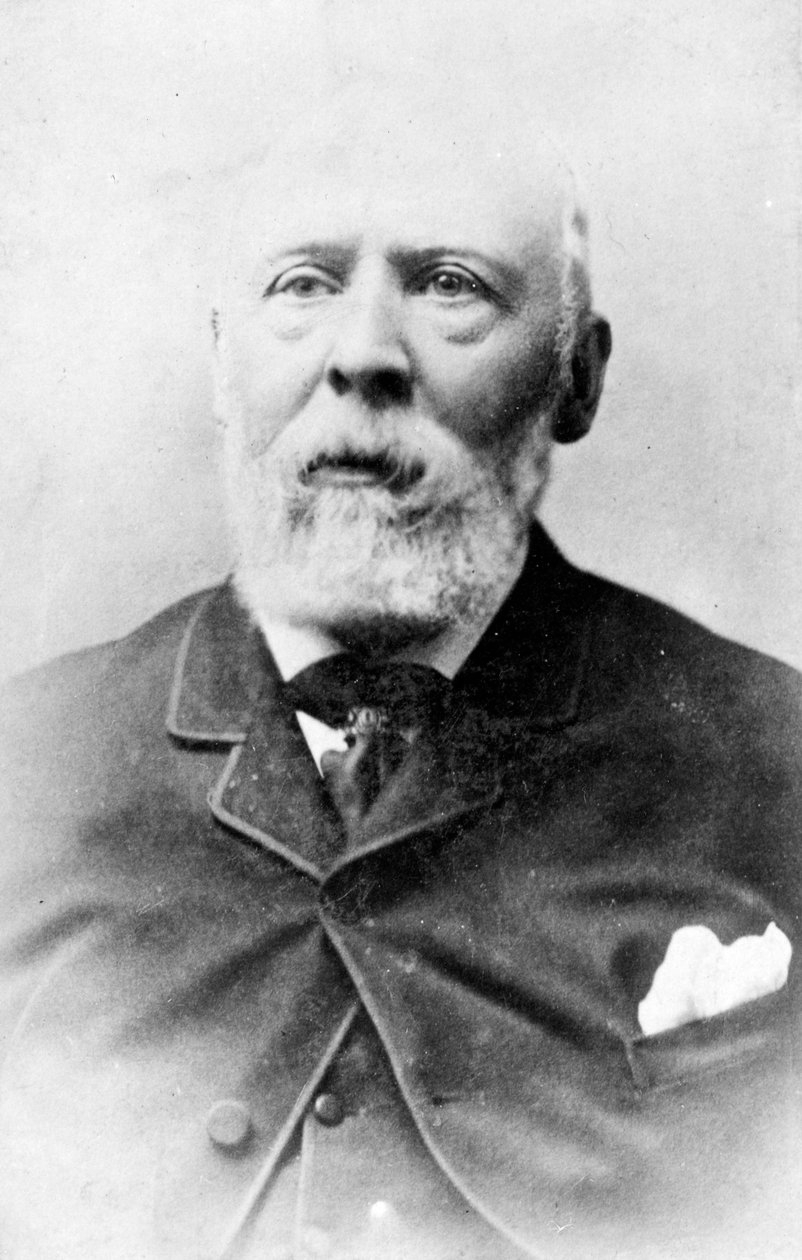
- Born: 21 February 1830; London, England
- Died: 20 December 1916 (aged 86); Croydon, England
- Notable work: The Death of Chatterton; The Stonebreaker
- Movement: Pre-Raphaelite Brotherhood

Henry Wallis RWS (21 February 1830 – 20 December 1916) was a British Pre-Raphaelite painter, writer and collector. He is best known for his 1856 painting The Death of Chatterton.

== Life ==
Wallis was born in London on 21 February 1830; his father's name and occupation are unknown. When in 1845 his mother, Mary Anne Thomas, married Andrew Wallis, a prosperous London architect, Henry took his stepfather's surname. His artistic training was thorough and influential. He was admitted as a probationer to the RA and enrolled in the Painting School in March 1848. He also studied in Paris at Charles Gleyre's atelier and at the Academie des Beaux Arts, sometime between 1849 and 1853.

Wallis is best remembered for his first great success, The Death of Chatterton, which he exhibited at the Royal Academy in 1856. The painting depicted the impoverished late 18th-century poet Thomas Chatterton, who poisoned himself in despair at the age of seventeen, and was considered a Romantic hero for many young and struggling artists in Wallis's day. His method and style in Chatterton reveal the importance of his connection to the Pre-Raphaelite movement, seen in the vibrant colours and careful build-up of symbolic detail. He used a bold colour scheme with a contrasting palette and he exploited the fall of the natural light through the window of the garret to implement his much loved style at the time, chiaroscuro. The size of Chatterton's garret was only fractionally larger than the scope of the painting, with room for Wallis and his easel and little else during the preliminary sketches, which were done on-site. The painting is 25x37" and is in the Tate Britain, with other versions in the Birmingham Museum and Art Gallery and the Yale Center for British Art.

There may have been more examples of Chatterton as it was popular and when Wallis had to pay the rent he would paint another version. He once said that dead poets are more saleable than dead labourers (referring to The Stonebreaker, his next major work). The Stonebreaker (1857, exhibited in 1858) consolidated his reputation as a true Pre-Raphaelite. In total, he showed 35 exhibits at the RA, but later in life developed a greater interest in watercolour painting. He was elected a full member of the RWS (Royal Watercolour Society) in 1878 and exhibited over 80 watercolours at the society.

The model for his acclaimed The Death of Chatterton was the young George Meredith, whose first wife Mary Ellen would later run off with Wallis.

Wallis's method of painting, especially in the early years of his career, and in particular for The Death of Chatterton, was to do the initial sketch, saturate it in water, use a grey tint to block in the shade, put on the colour and allow it to dry. When firm, he would use a hair pencil to add in the details, for which he is so renowned. For the light, he would touch the area in question with water and then rub it with a piece of bread. His studio during these years was in Chelsea, a very bohemian and out of the way part of London at the time.

He died, aged 86 and almost blind, at 1 Walpole Road, Croydon, on 20 December 1916. He was buried on the eastern side of Highgate Cemetery.

== Gallery ==
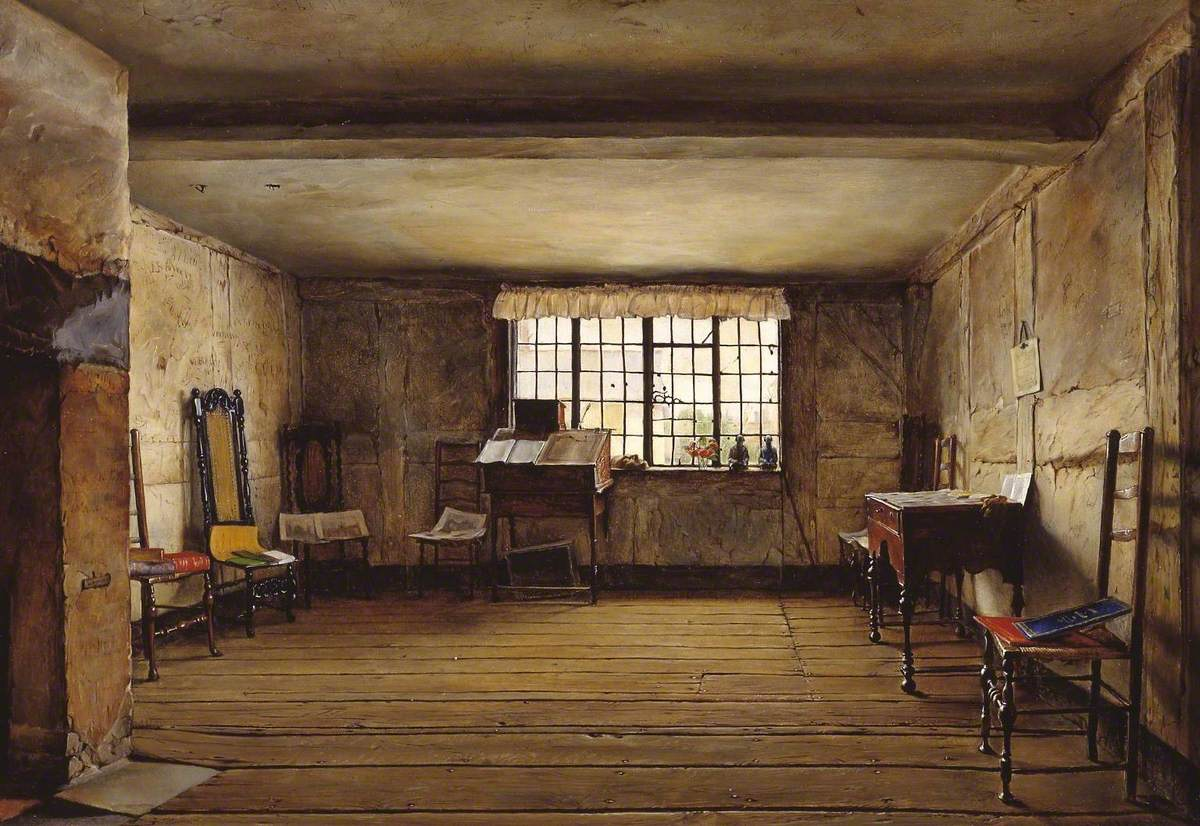
The Room in Which Shakespeare Was Born (1853)

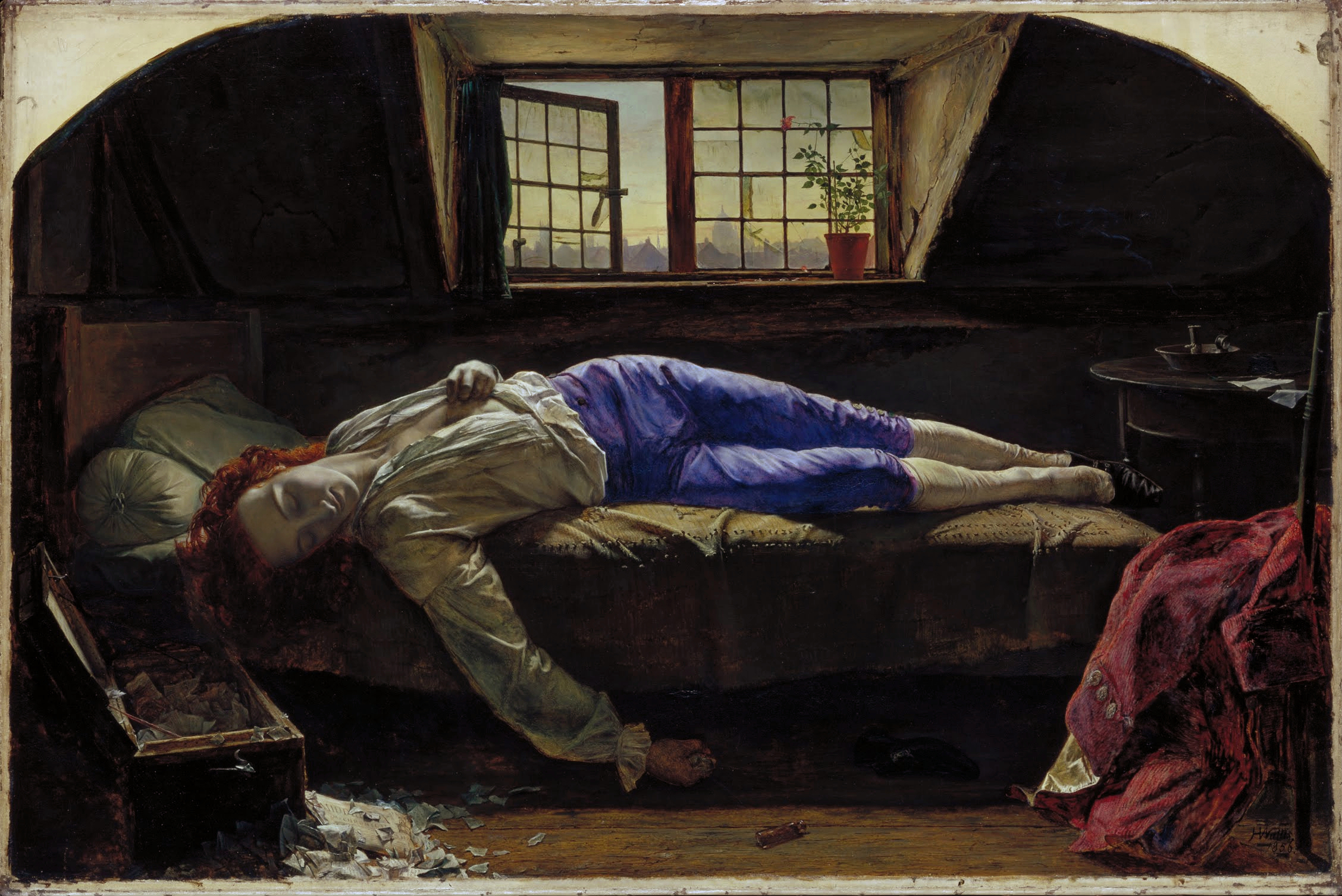
The Death of Chatterton (1856)

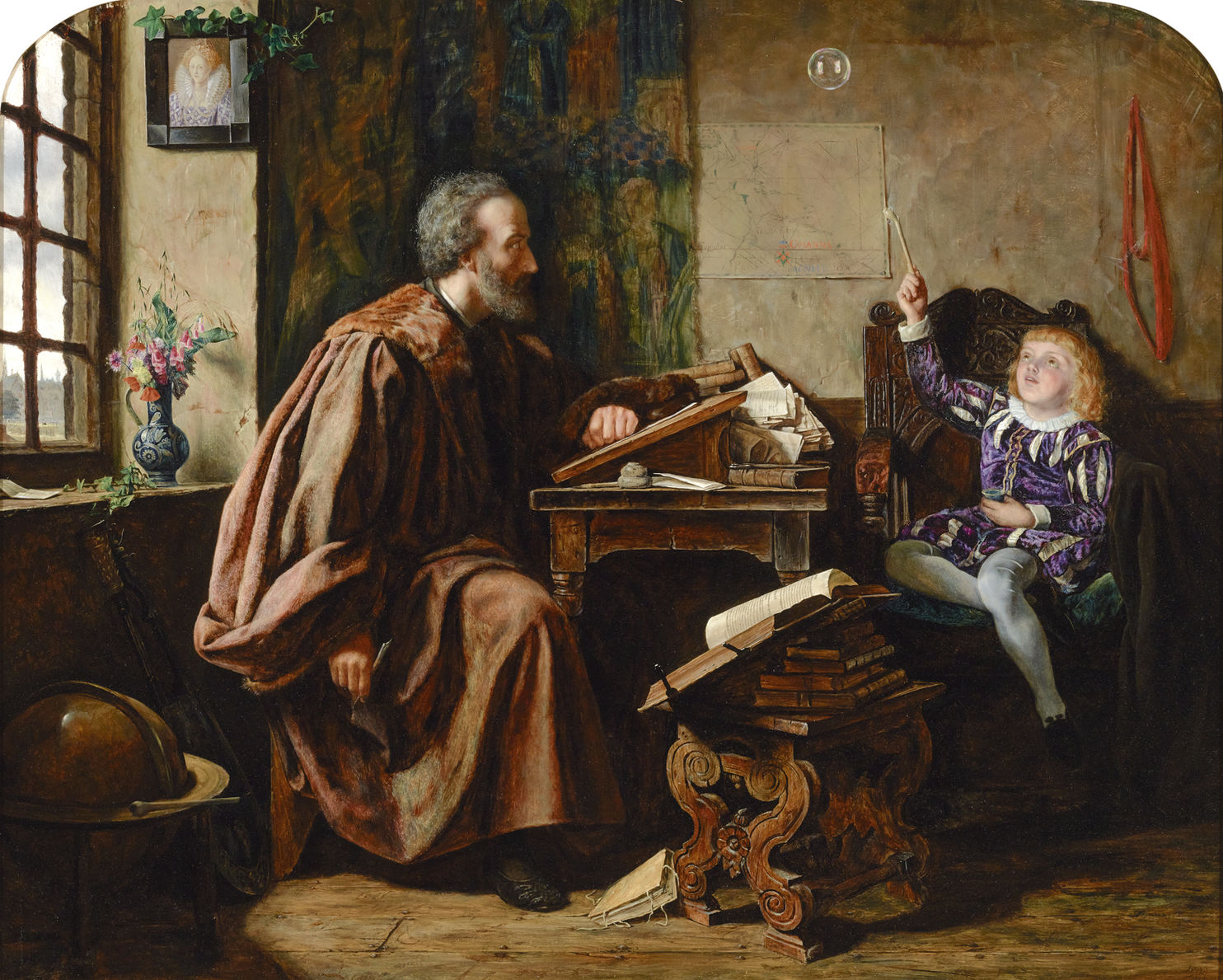
Sir Walter Raleigh in the Tower (1856)

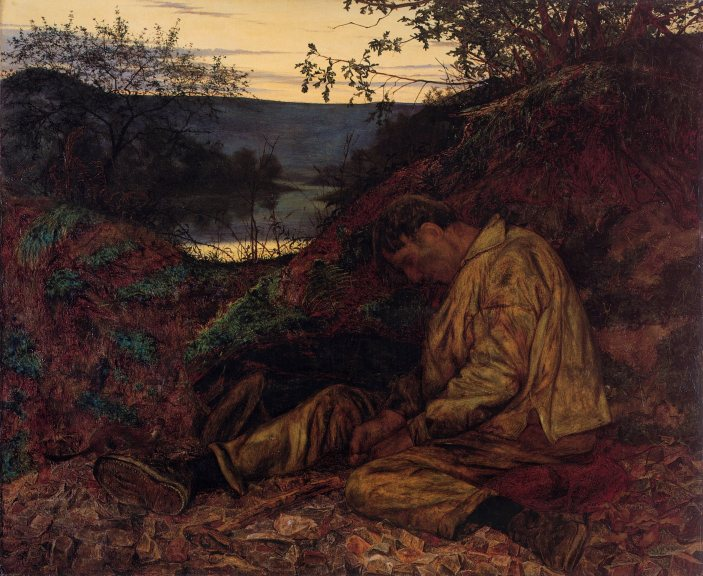
The Stonebreaker (1857)

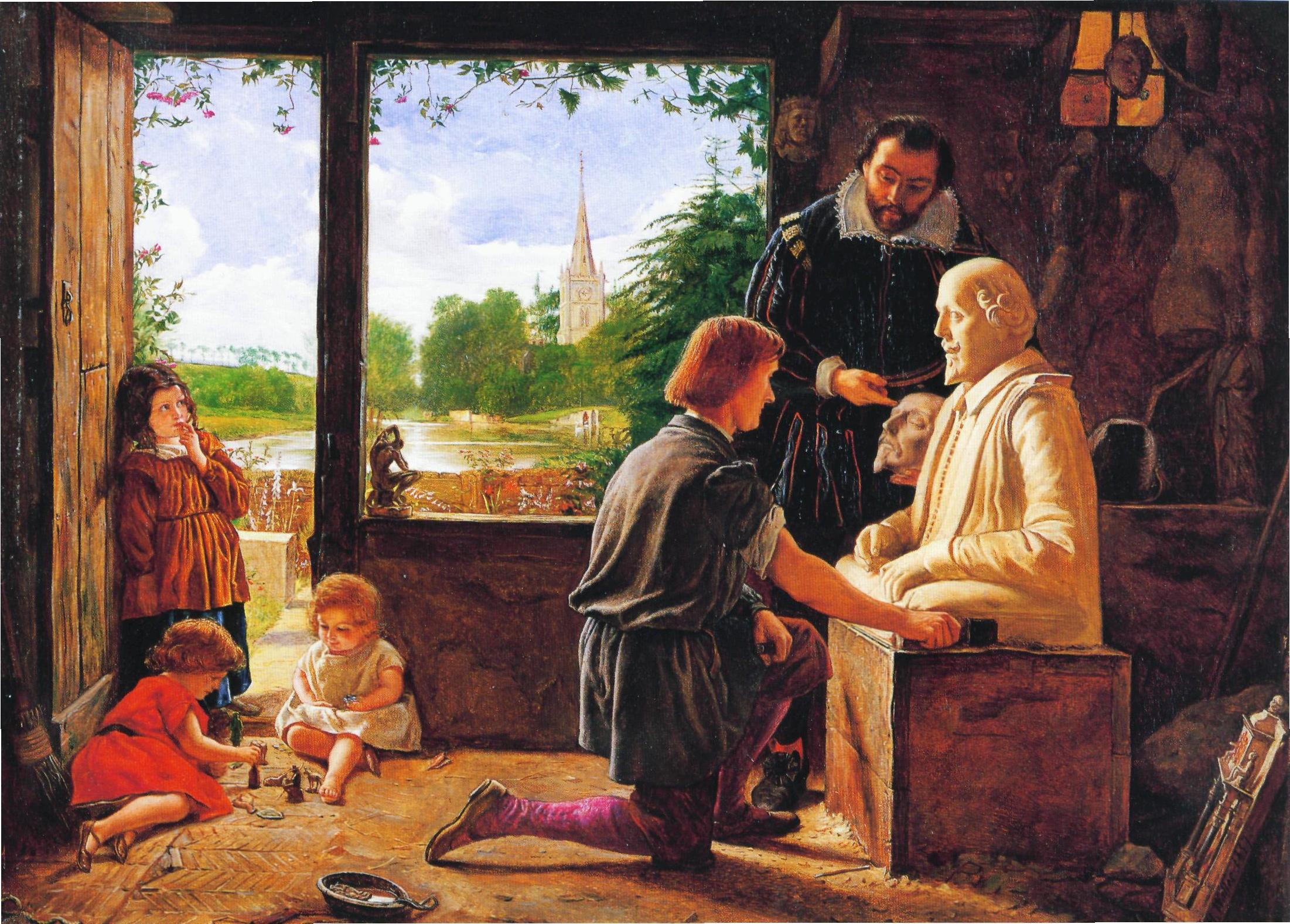
A Sculptor's Workshop, Stratford-upon-Avon, 1617 (1857)

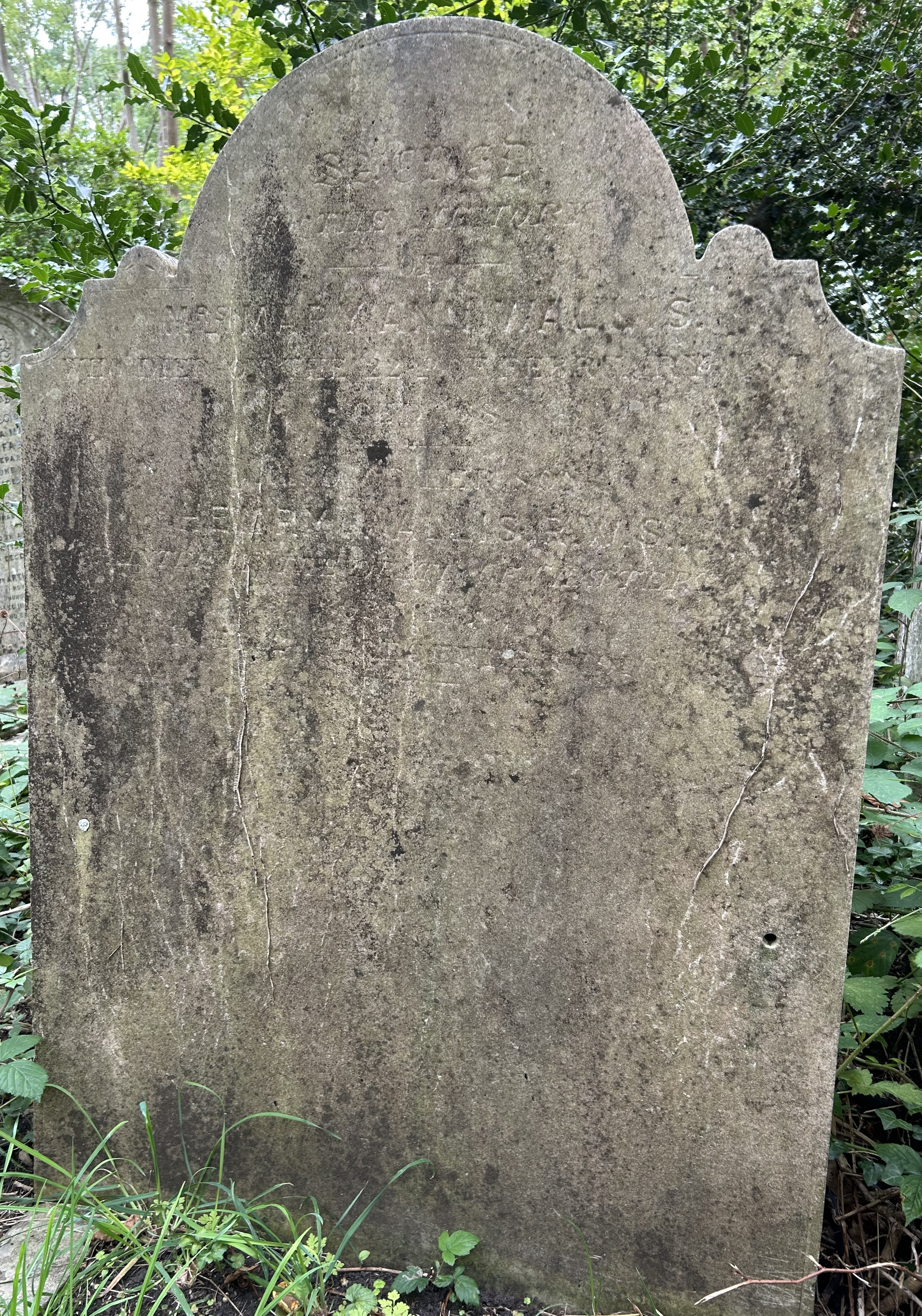
Grave of Henry Wallis in Highgate Cemetery

== Selected bibliography ==
- Hamlin, Robin: Henry Wallis, in: Oxford Dictionary of National Biography, vol. 57, London 2004, pp. 13–14.
- van de Put, A., Henry Wallis, 1830–1916, Faenza, v (1917), pp. 33–8.
- Ramm, John, "The Forgotten Pre-Raphaelite", Antique Dealer & Collectors Guide, March/April 2003, Vol 56, 8 & 9.
- Treuherz, J. Hard Times: Social Realism in Victorian Art (London, 1987), pp. 36–39.
- Literary treatment in Peter Ackroyd's novel, Chatterton, first published in 1987.
