= Thomas Chatterton =

English medieval-style poet (1752–1770)

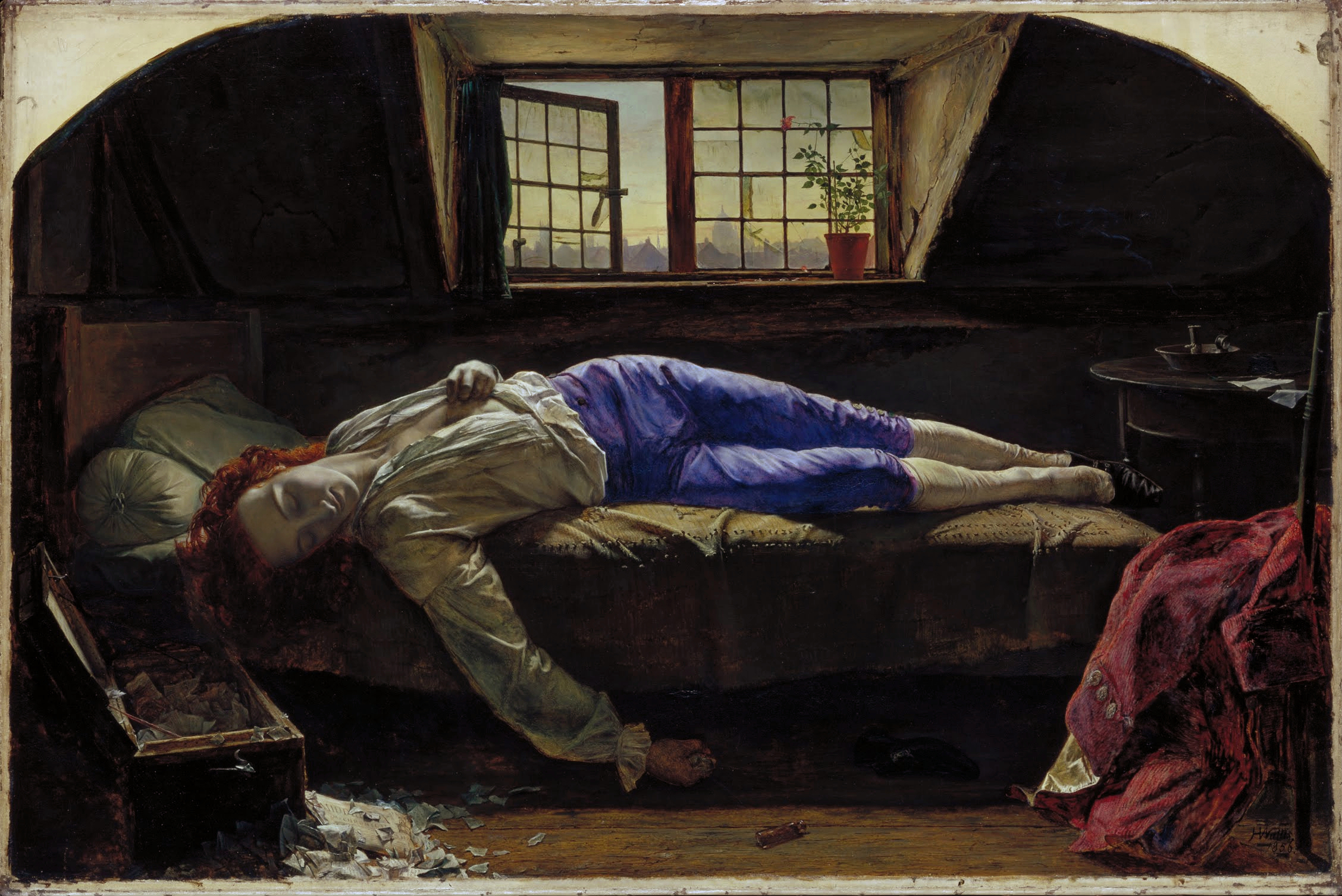
- The Death of Chatterton, 1856, by Henry Wallis (Tate Britain, London)
- Born: 20 November 1752; Bristol, England
- Died: 24 August 1770 (aged 17); Holborn, London, England
- Occupations: Poet, forger
- Writing career
- Pen name: Thomas Rowley, Decimus

Thomas Chatterton (20 November 1752 – 24 August 1770) was an English poet who committed suicide at age 17. He was an influence on Romantic artists of the period such as Shelley, Keats, Wordsworth and Coleridge.

Although fatherless and raised in poverty, Chatterton was a studious child, publishing work by the age of 11. He was able to pass off his work as that of a fictional 15th-century poet called Thomas Rowley, though he was denounced by Horace Walpole.

At 17, he sought outlets for his political writings in London, having impressed the Lord Mayor, William Beckford, and the leader John Wilkes, but his earnings were not enough to keep him, and he poisoned himself. His life and death attracted much interest among romantic poets, and Alfred de Vigny wrote a play about him. The oil painting The Death of Chatterton by Pre-Raphaelite artist Henry Wallis was inspired by him.

== Childhood ==
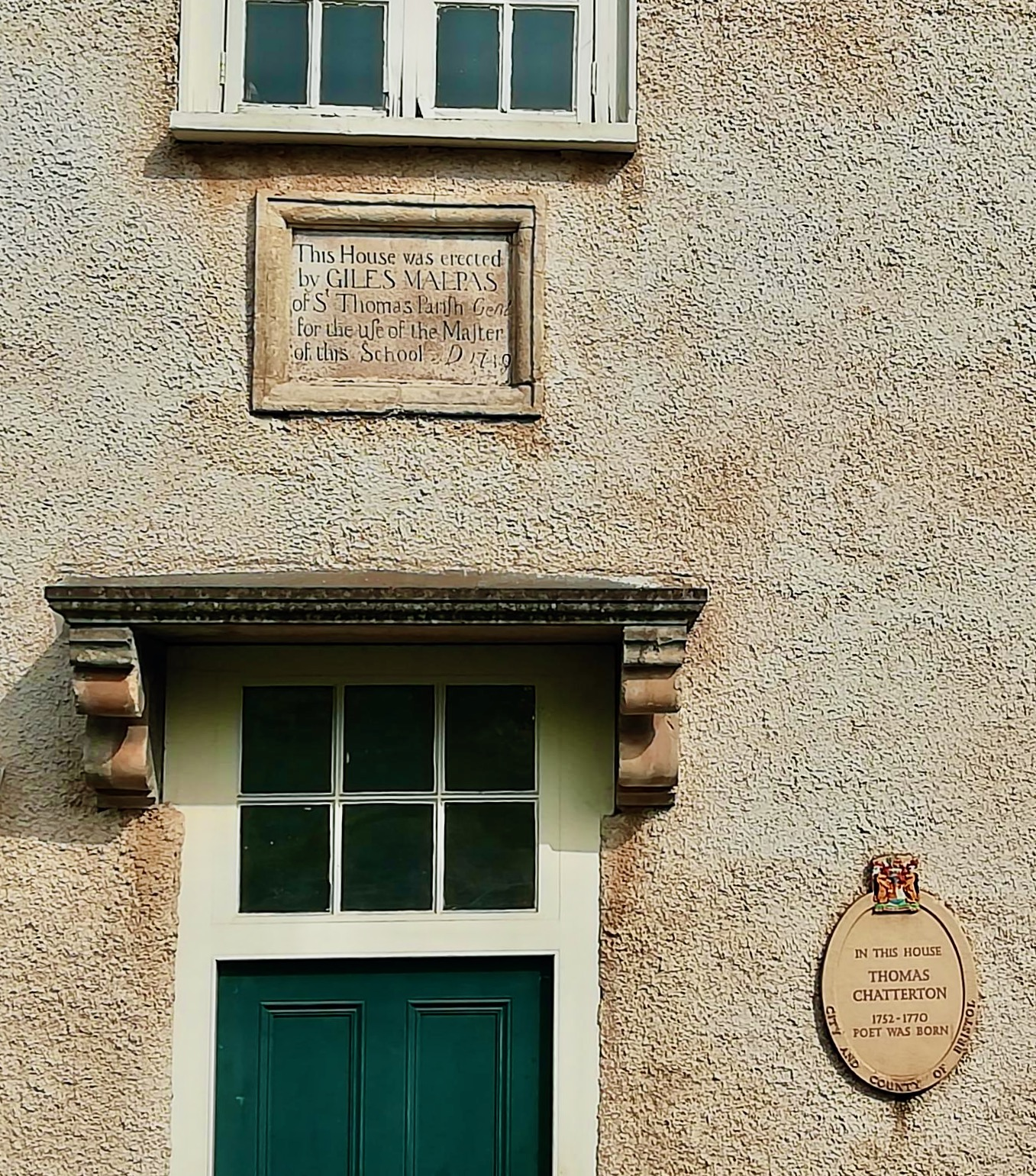
Thomas Chatterton's Birthplace Home and Commemorative Plaque, Bristol

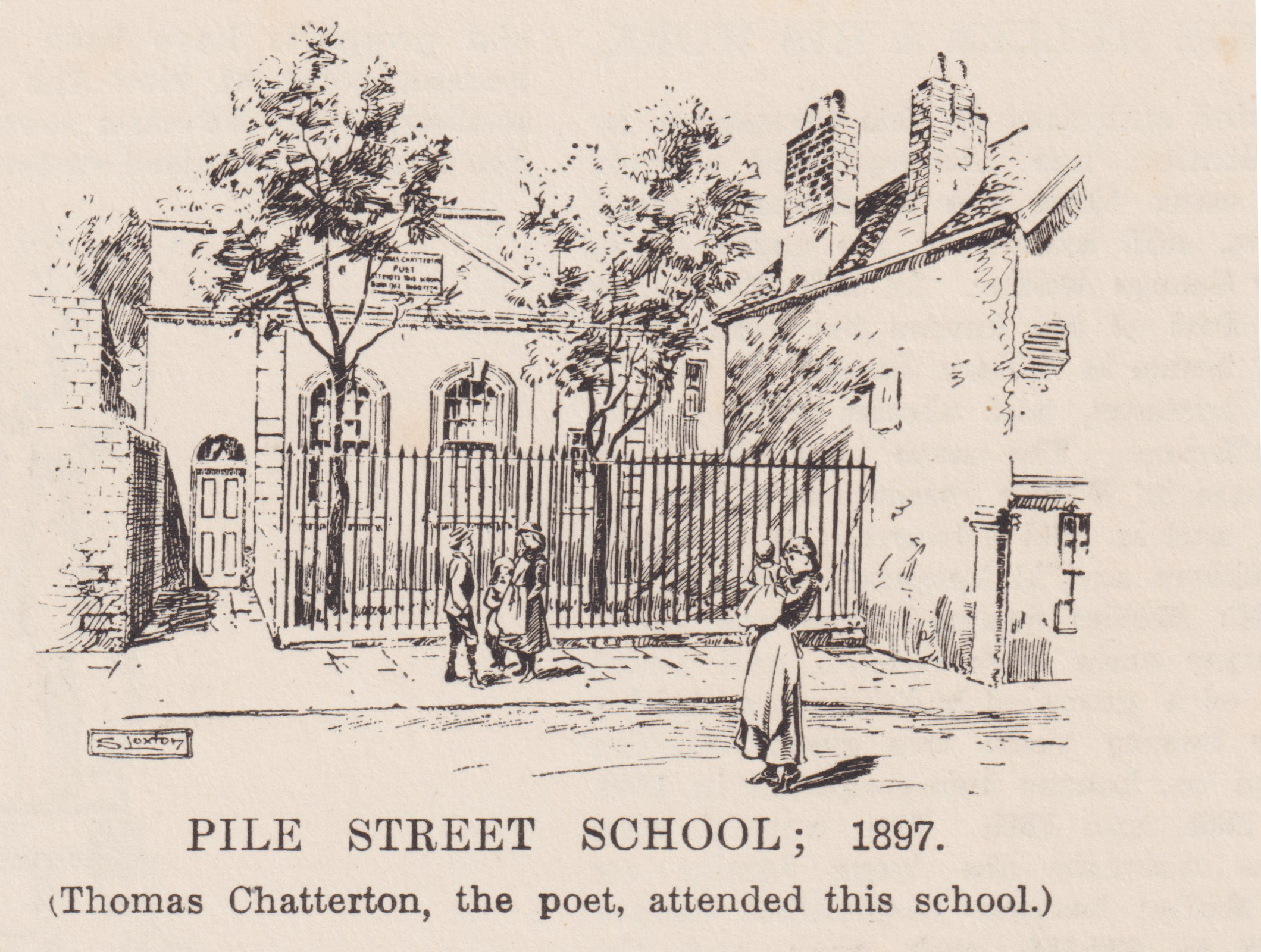
Pile Street School, depicted 1897

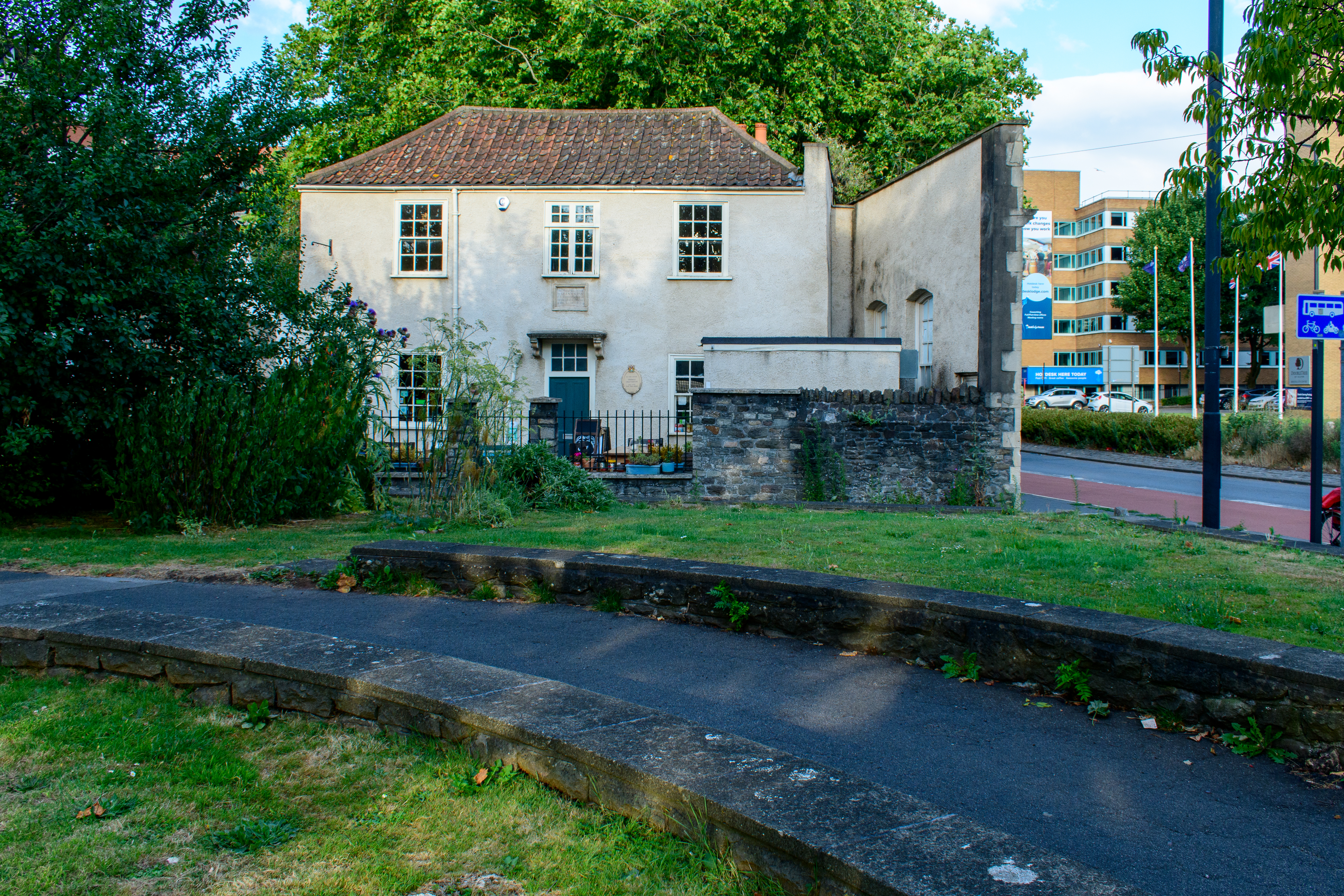
The wall at the right of the house in Phippen street where Chatterton was raised is that of the c. 1739 school where Chatterton's father was the master.

Chatterton was born in Bristol to Sarah Chatterton, his father also named Thomas having died three months previous. His sister Mary was three years older and her married name was Newton. In Bristol, the office of the sexton of St Mary Redcliffe had long been held by the Chatterton family. Chatterton's father was a musician, a poet, and a numismatist. He had been a sub-chanter at Bristol Cathedral and master of the Pyle Street free school.

After Chatterton's birth, his mother established a girls' school and took in sewing and ornamental needlework. From his earliest years, he was liable to fits of abstraction. Chatterton was admitted to Edward Colston's Charity, a Bristol charity school, in which the curriculum was limited to reading, writing, arithmetic and the catechism.

Chatterton learned his first letters from the illuminated capitals of an old musical folio, which his mother said 'he fell in love with' and he learned to read out of a black-letter Bible or was taught by her. His sister said he did not like reading out of small books. Wayward from his earliest years, and uninterested in the games of other children, he was thought to be educationally backward.

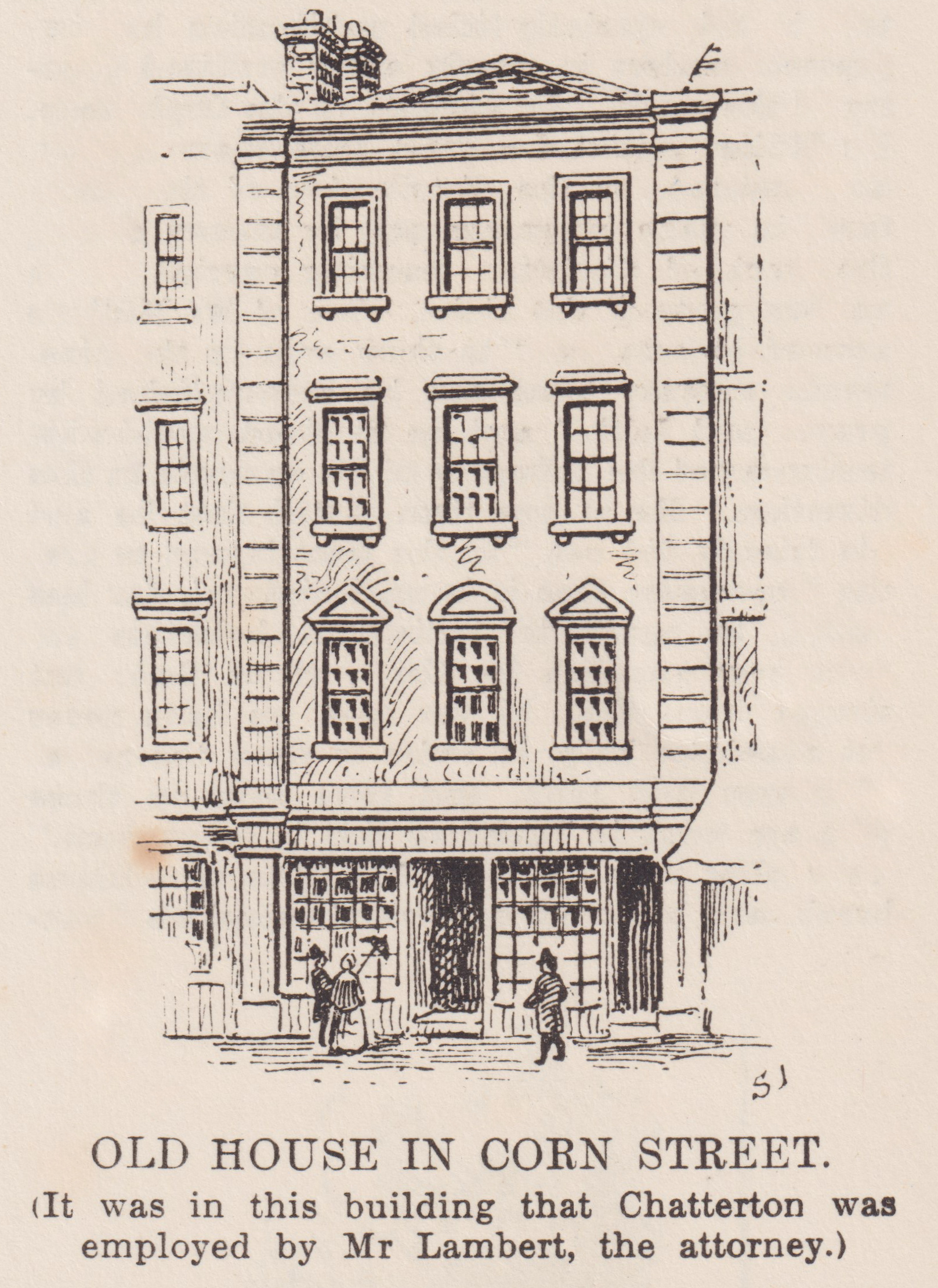
The office of Mr Lambert, attorney, in Corn Street, where Chatterton was employed

By the age of 11, he had become a contributor to Felix Farley's Bristol Journal. Elsewhere this is recorded as in 1768 when he was 16. The article was "Description of Frryars passing over the Old Bridge, taken from an ancient manuscript".

His confirmation inspired him to write some religious poems published in that paper. In 1763, a cross which had adorned the churchyard of St Mary Redcliffe for upwards of three centuries was destroyed by a churchwarden, so he sent to the local journal on 7 January 1764 a satire on the parish vandal.

== First "medieval" works ==
The first of his literary mysteries was the dialogue of "Elinoure and Juga," which he showed to Thomas Phillips, the usher at Colston's Hospital, where he was a pupil, pretending it was the work of a 15th-century poet. Chatterton remained a boarder at Colston's Hospital for more than six years, and it was only his uncle who encouraged the pupils to write. Three of Chatterton's companions are named as youths whom Phillips's taste for poetry stimulated to rivalry; but Chatterton told no one about his own more daring literary adventures. His pocket-money was spent on borrowing books from a circulating library; and he ingratiated himself with book collectors, in order to obtain access to John Weever, William Dugdale and Arthur Collins, as well as to Thomas Speght's edition of Chaucer, Spenser and other books. At some point he came across Elizabeth Cooper's anthology of verse, which is said to have been a major source for his inventions.

Chatterton's "Rowleian" jargon appears to have been chiefly the result of the study of John Kersey's Dictionarium Anglo-Britannicum, and it seems his knowledge even of Chaucer was very slight. His holidays were mostly spent at his mother's house, and much of them in the retreat of his attic study there. He lived for the most part in an ideal world of his own, in the reign of Edward IV, during the mid-15th century, when the great Bristol merchant William II Canynges (died 1474), five times mayor of Bristol, patron and rebuilder of St Mary Redcliffe "still ruled in Bristol's civic chair." Canynges was familiar to him from his recumbent effigy in Redcliffe church, and is represented by Chatterton as an enlightened patron of art and literature.

== Adopts persona of Thomas Rowley ==
Chatterton soon conceived the romance of Thomas Rowley, a fictional monk from the 15th century, and adopted for himself the pseudonym Thomas Rowley for poetry and history. Psychoanalyst Louise J. Kaplan suggested that Chatterton being fatherless played a great role in his imposturous creation of Rowley. In this interpretation, the development of his masculine identity was held back by the fact that he was raised by two women: his mother Sarah and his sister Mary. Therefore, "to reconstitute the lost father in fantasy," he unconsciously created "two interweaving family romances [fantasies], each with its own scenario." The first of these was the romance of Rowley for whom he created a fatherlike, wealthy patron, William Canynge, while the second was as Kaplan named it his romance of "Jack and the Beanstalk." He imagined he would become a famous poet who by his talents would be able to rescue his mother from poverty.

== Chatterton's search for a patron ==
Chatterton started to look for a patron, at first he was trying to do so in Bristol where he became acquainted with William Barrett, George Catcott and Henry Burgum. He assisted them by providing Rowley transcripts for their work. The antiquary William Barrett relied exclusively on these fake transcripts when writing his History and Antiquities of Bristol (1789) which became a failure. But since his patrons were not willing to pay him enough, he turned to Horace Walpole. In 1769, Chatterton sent "The Ryse of Peyncteynge yn Englade" to Walpole, along with specimens of pseudo-medieval poetry he attributed to Rowley and others. Walpole professed himself "singularly obliged," calling the letter "valuable and full of information" and the poems "wonderful for their harmony and spirit," and offering to print them "if they have never been printed." Later, however, after Chatterton confessed his age and situation, Walpole consulted his friends Thomas Gray and William Mason about the veracity of the writings, and Gray "at once pronounced them forgeries."

Walpole's pride was injured at having been duped by Chatterton, and he cut off correspondence with the poet. Many later commentators have reproached Walpole for this, especially in light of Walpole's having passed off his own Gothic novel The Castle of Otranto as a translation from a medieval Italian manuscript. Walpole's comment that Chatterton's "ingenuity in counterfeiting styles, and, I believe, hands, might easily have led him to those more facile imitations of prose, promissory notes" led Samuel Taylor Coleridge to remark: "Oh! ye who honor the name of man, rejoice that Walpole is called a lord." Some writers have speculated that, had Walpole reacted differently, "a slight effort, at this time, ... might have saved from destruction Thomas Chatterton."

== Political writings ==
Badly hurt by Walpole's snub, Chatterton wrote very little for a summer. Then, after the end of the summer, he turned his attention to periodical literature and politics, and exchanged Farley's Bristol Journal for the Town and Country Magazine and other London periodicals. Imitating the style of the pseudonymous letter writer Junius, then in the full blaze of his triumph, he turned his pen against the Duke of Grafton, the Earl of Bute and Augusta of Saxe-Gotha (the then Princess of Wales).

== Leaving Bristol ==
He had just dispatched one of his political diatribes to the Middlesex Journal when he sat down on Easter Eve, 17 April 1770, and penned his "Last Will and Testament," a satirical compound of jest and earnest, in which he intimated his intention of ending his life the following evening. Among his satirical bequests, such as his "humility" to the Rev. Mr Camplin, his "religion" to Dean Barton, and his "modesty" along with his "prosody and grammar" to Mr Burgum, he leaves "to Bristol all his spirit and disinterestedness, parcels of goods unknown on its quay since the days of Canynge and Rowley." In more genuine earnestness, he recalls the name of Michael Clayfield, a friend to whom he owed intelligent sympathy. The will was possibly prepared in order to frighten his master into letting him go. If so, it had the desired effect. John Lambert, the attorney to whom he was apprenticed, cancelled his indentures; his friends and acquaintances having donated money, Chatterton went to London.

Chatterton submitted Oddities of Lord U_____ b___e. to the Town & Country Magazine from Uxbridge, 20 January 1770 signed A Hunter of Oddities.

== London ==
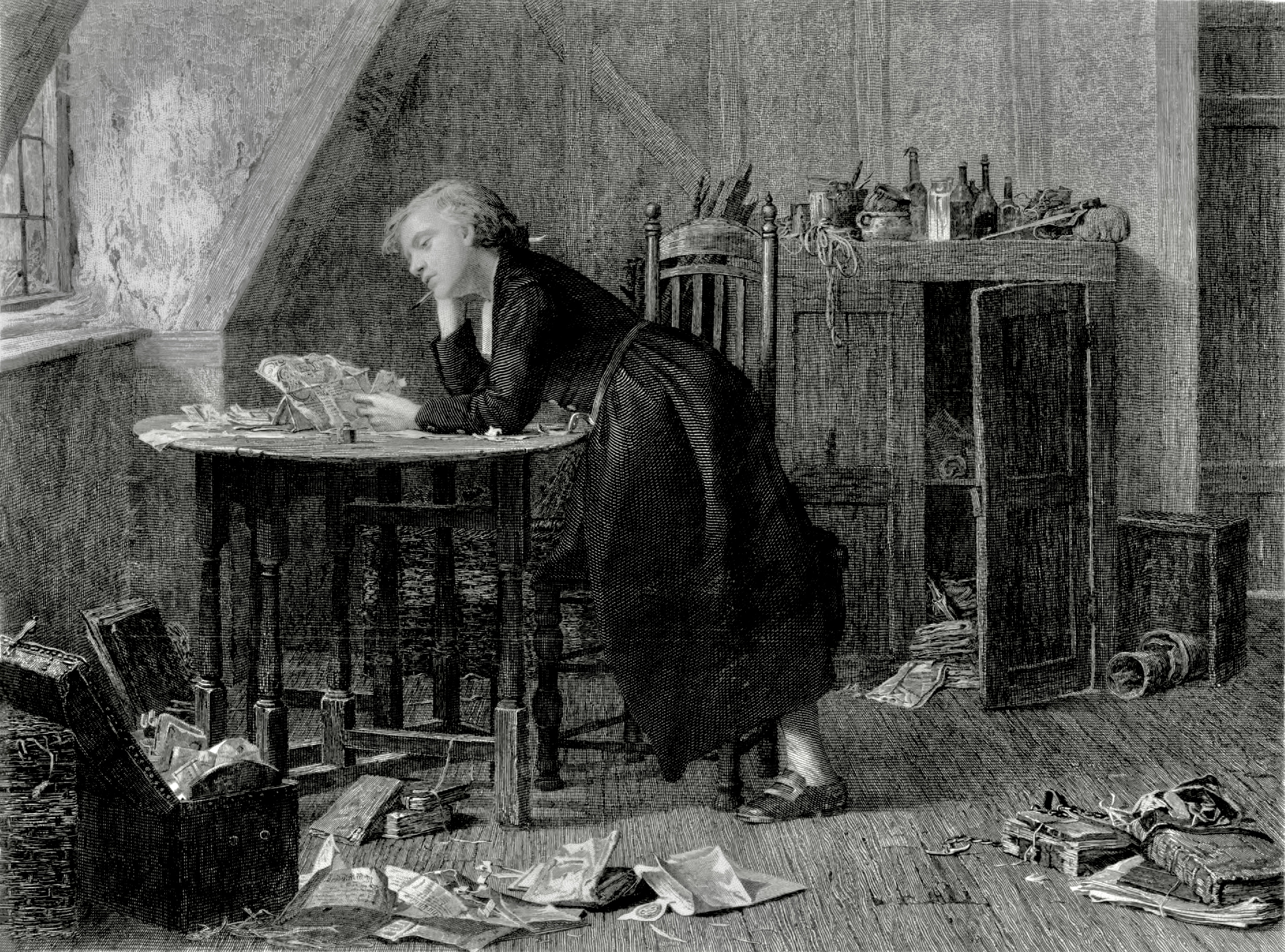
Chatterton's Holiday Afternoon engraved by William Ridgway, after W.B. Morris, pub. 1875

Chatterton already was known to the readers of the Middlesex Journal as a rival of Junius under the nom de plume of Decimus. He also had been a contributor to Hamilton's Town and Country Magazine, and speedily found access to the Freeholder's Magazine, another political miscellany supportive of John Wilkes and liberty. His contributions were accepted, but the editors paid little or nothing for them.

He wrote hopefully to his mother and sister, and spent his first earnings in buying gifts for them. Wilkes had noted his trenchant style "and expressed a desire to know the author"; and Lord Mayor William Beckford graciously acknowledged a political address of his, and greeted him "as politely as a citizen could."

Chatterton was abstemious and extraordinarily diligent. He could assume the style of Junius or Tobias Smollett, reproduce the satiric bitterness of Charles Churchill, parody James Macpherson's Ossian, or write in the manner of Alexander Pope or with the polished grace of Thomas Gray and William Collins.

He wrote political letters, eclogues, lyrics, operas and satires, both in prose and verse. In June 1770, after nine weeks in London, he moved from Shoreditch, where he had lodged with a relative, to an attic in Brook Street, Holborn (now beneath Alfred Waterhouse's Holborn Bars building). He was still short of money; and now, state prosecutions of the press rendered letters in the Junius vein no longer admissible. This threw him back on the lighter resources of his pen. In Shoreditch, he had shared a room; but now, for the first time, he enjoyed uninterrupted solitude. His bed-fellow at Mr Walmsley's, Shoreditch, noted that much of the night was spent by him in writing; and now he could write all throughout the night. The romance of his earlier years re-emerged, and he transcribed from an imaginary parchment of the old priest Rowley his "Excelente Balade of Charitie." This poem, disguised in archaic language, he sent to the editor of the Town and Country Magazine, where it was rejected.

Mr Cross, a neighbouring apothecary, repeatedly invited him to join him at dinner or supper; but he refused. His landlady, too, pressed him to share her dinner, but in vain. "She knew," as she afterwards said, "that he had not eaten anything for two or three days." However, Chatterton assured her that he was not hungry. The note of his actual receipts, found in his pocket-book after his death, shows that Hamilton, Fell and other editors who had been so liberal in flattery, had paid him at the rate of a shilling for an article, and less than eightpence each for his songs; much of the accepted material was held in reserve and still unpaid for. According to his foster-mother, Chatterton had wished to study medicine with Barrett, and in his desperation he wrote to Barrett for a letter to help him to an opening as a surgeon's assistant on board an African trading ship.

== Death ==
According to a late 19th-century account, Chatterton once fell into a newly dug grave in St Pancras Churchyard while absorbed by reading epitaphs with a friend. When helped out by his companion, he reportedly said, "I have been at war with the grave some time," a remark seen as a grim foreshadowing of his death three days later. However, the accuracy of this story is uncertain. On 24 August 1770, he retired for the last time to his attic in Brook Street, and consumed arsenic after tearing into fragments of whatever literary remains were at hand. He was 17 years and nine months old. There has been some speculation that Chatterton may have accidentally overdosed on the arsenic as a treatment for a venereal disease, since it was commonly used for such conditions at that time.

== Posthumous recognition ==
The death of Chatterton attracted little notice at the time as the few who cared for the Rowley poems regarded him as their mere transcriber. He was interred in a burying-ground attached to the Shoe Lane Workhouse in the parish of St Andrew, Holborn, later the site of Farringdon Market. There is a discredited story that the body of the poet was recovered, and secretly buried by his uncle, Richard Phillips, in Redcliffe Churchyard. There a monument has been erected to his memory, with the appropriate inscription, borrowed from his "Will", and so supplied by the poet's own pen. "To the memory of Thomas Chatterton. Reader! judge not. If thou art a Christian, believe that he shall be judged by a Superior Power. To that Power only is he now answerable."

It was after Chatterton's death that the controversy over his work began. Poems supposed to have been written at Bristol by Thomas Rowley and others, in the Fifteenth Century (1777) was edited by Thomas Tyrwhitt, a Chaucerian scholar who believed them genuine medieval works. However, the appendix to the following year's edition recognises that they were probably Chatterton's own work. Thomas Warton, in his History of English Poetry (1778) included Rowley among 15th-century poets, but apparently did not believe in the antiquity of the poems. In 1782 a new edition of Rowley's poems appeared, with a "Commentary, in which the antiquity of them is considered and defended," by Jeremiah Milles, Dean of Exeter.

The controversy which raged round the Rowley poems is discussed in Andrew Kippis, Biographia Britannica (vol. iv., 1789), where there is a detailed account by George Gregory of Chatterton's life (pp. 573–619). This was reprinted in the edition (1803) of Chatterton's Works by Robert Southey and Joseph Cottle, published for the benefit of the poet's sister. The neglected condition of the study of earlier English in the 18th century alone accounts for the temporary success of Chatterton's mystification. It has long been agreed that Chatterton was solely responsible for the Rowley poems; the language and style were analysed in confirmation of this view by W. W. Skeat in an introductory essay prefaced to vol. ii. of The Poetical Works of Thomas Chatterton (1871) in the "Aldine Edition of the British Poets." The Chatterton manuscripts originally in the possession of William Barrett of Bristol were left by his heir to the British Museum in 1800. Others are preserved in the Bristol library.

== Legacy ==
Chatterton's genius and his death are commemorated by Percy Bysshe Shelley in Adonais (though its main emphasis is the commemoration of Keats), by William Wordsworth in "Resolution and Independence", by Samuel Taylor Coleridge in "Monody on the Death of Chatterton", by Dante Gabriel Rossetti in "Five English Poets", and in John Keats' sonnet "To Chatterton". Keats also inscribed Endymion "to the memory of Thomas Chatterton".

Two of Alfred de Vigny's works, Stello and the drama Chatterton, give fictionalized accounts of the poet; in the former, there is a scene in which William Beckford's harsh criticism of Chatterton's work drives the poet to suicide. The three-act play Chatterton was first performed at the Théâtre-Français, Paris, on 12 February 1835. In 1876, the composer Leoncavallo wrote an opera Chatterton based upon Vigny's play and novel.

Herbert Croft, in his Love and Madness, interpolated a long and valuable account of Chatterton, giving many of the poet's letters, and much information obtained from his family and friends (pp. 125–244, letter li.).

The most famous image of Chatterton in the 19th century was The Death of Chatterton (1856) by Henry Wallis, now in Tate Britain, London. Two smaller versions, sketches or replicas, are held by the Birmingham Museum and Art Gallery and the Yale Center for British Art. The figure of the poet was modelled by the young George Meredith.

Two of Chatterton's poems were set to music as glees by the English composer John Wall Callcott. These include separate settings of distinct verses within the Song to Aelle. His best known poem, O synge untoe mie roundelaie was set to a five-part madrigal by Samuel Wesley. Chatterton has attracted operatic treatment a number of times throughout history, notably Ruggero Leoncavallo's largely unsuccessful two-act Chatterton; the German composer Matthias Pintscher's modernistic Thomas Chatterton (1998); and Australian composer Matthew Dewey's lyrical yet dramatically intricate one-man mythography entitled The Death of Thomas Chatterton.

In The Woman in White by Wilkie Collins, published in serial form in 1859–60, Count Fosco asks: "Who is the English poet who has won the most universal sympathy – who makes the easiest of all subjects for pathetic writing and pathetic painting? That nice young person who began life with a forgery, and ended it by a suicide – your dear, romantic, interesting Chatterton." Second Epoch, Chapter IV.There is a collection of "Chattertoniana" in the British Library, consisting of works by Chatterton, newspaper cuttings, articles dealing with the Rowley controversy and other subjects, with manuscript notes by Joseph Haslewood, and several autograph letters. E. H. W. Meyerstein, who worked for many years in the manuscript room of the British Museum wrote a definitive work—"A Life of Thomas Chatterton"—in 1930. Peter Ackroyd's 1987 novel Chatterton was a literary re-telling of the poet's story, giving emphasis to the philosophical and spiritual implications of forgery. In Ackroyd's version, Chatterton's death was accidental.

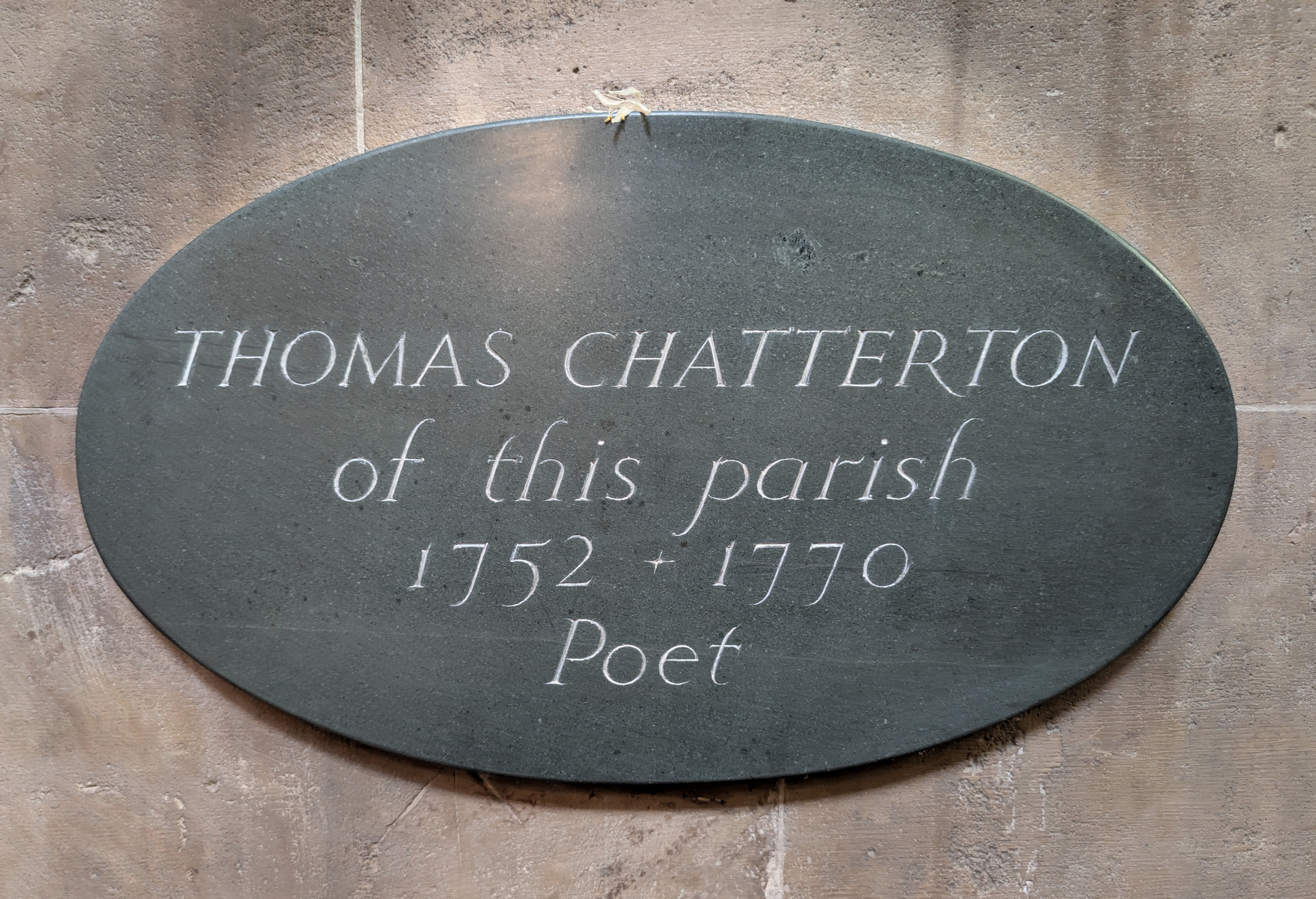
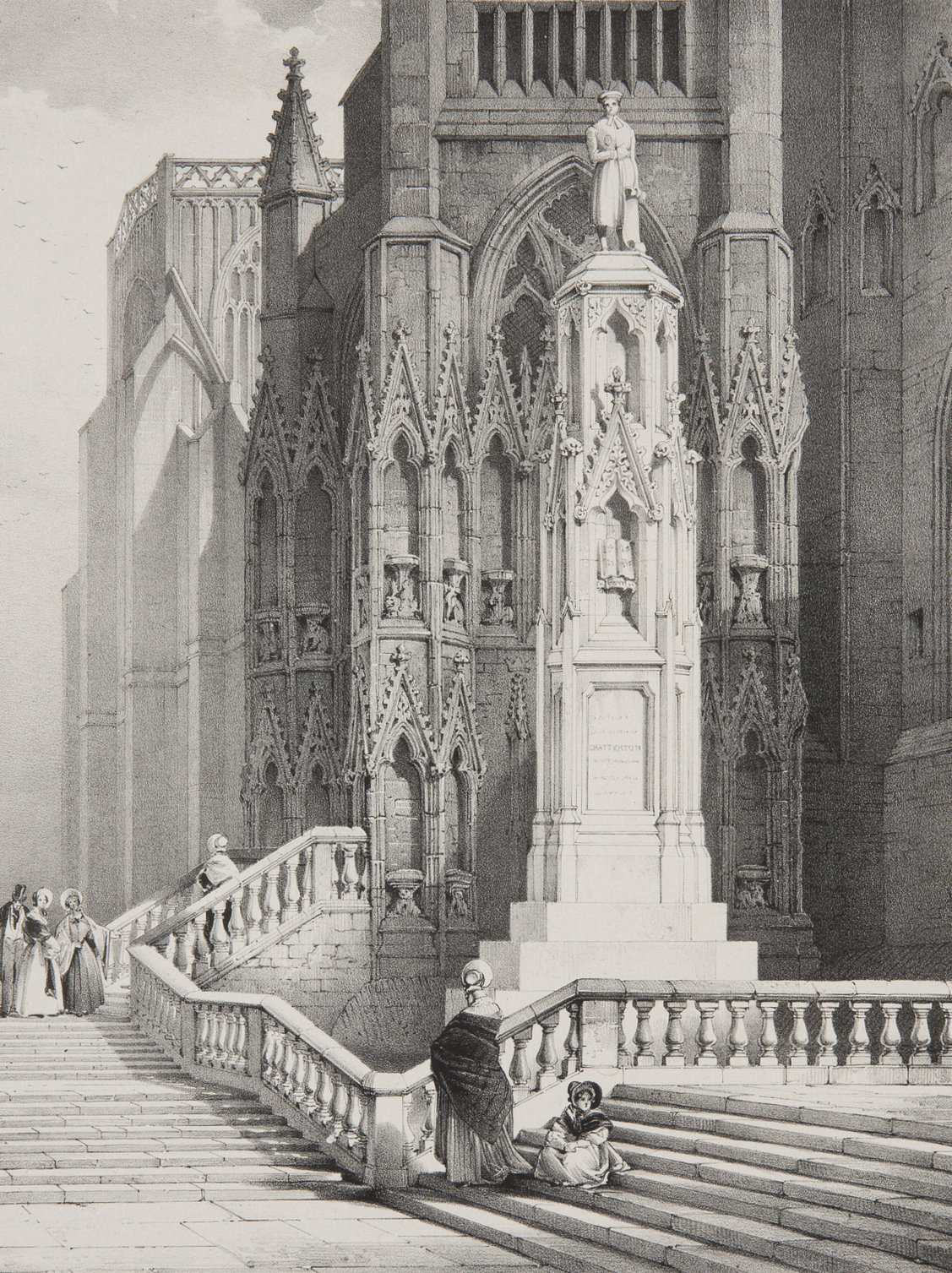
A 1967 plaque (left) installed in the south transept of St Mary Redcliffe, Bristol. It replaced an 1840 monument (right) that was taken down due to deterioration caused by repeated vandalism.

In 1886, architect Herbert Horne and Oscar Wilde unsuccessfully attempted to have a plaque erected at Colston's School, Bristol. Wilde, who lectured on Chatterton at this time, suggested the inscription: "To the Memory of Thomas Chatterton, One of England's Greatest Poets, and Sometime pupil at this school."

In 1928, a plaque in memory of Chatterton was mounted on 39, Brooke Street, Holborn, bearing the inscription below. The plaque has been since transferred to a modern office building on the same site.

In a House on this Site
Thomas
Chatterton,
died
24 August 1770.

Within Bromley Common, there is a road called Chatterton Road; this is the main thoroughfare in Chatterton Village, based around the public house named The Chatterton Arms. Both road and pub are named after the poet.

French singer Serge Gainsbourg entitled one of his songs Chatterton (1967), stating:

Chatterton suicidé
Hannibal suicidé [...]
Quant à moi
Ça ne va plus très bien.

The song was covered (in Portuguese) by Seu Jorge live and recorded in the album Ana & Jorge: Ao Vivo. It was also recorded as an English language translation by Mick Harvey on the album "Intoxicated Man".

French singer, songwriter and actor Alain Bashung entitled his 1994 studio album Chatterton.

French pop/rock band Feu! Chatterton took their name in homage to Chatterton. The band added the expression "Feu" ("fire", in French, formula once used for Kings' or Queens' death) to which they added an exclamation mark as a sign of resurrection.

== Works ==
1. 'An Elegy on the much lamented Death of William Beckford, Esq.,' 4to, pp. 14, 1770.
2. 'The Execution of Sir Charles Bawdwin' (edited by Thomas Eagles, F.S.A.), 4to, pp. 26, 1772.
3. 'Poems supposed to have been written at Bristol, by Thomas Rowley and others, in the Fifteenth Century' (edited by Thomas Tyrwhitt), 8vo, pp. 307, 1777.
4. 'Appendix' (to the 3rd edition of the poems, edited by the same), 8vo, pp. 309–333, 1778.
5. 'Miscellanies in Prose and Verse, by Thomas Chatterton, the supposed author of the Poems published under the names of Rowley, Canning, &c.' (edited by John Broughton), 8vo, pp. 245, 1778.
6. 'Poems supposed to have been written at Bristol in the Fifteenth Century by Thomas Rowley, Priest, &c., [edited] by Jeremiah Milles, D.D., Dean of Exeter,' 4to, pp. 545, 1782.
7. 'A Supplement to the Miscellanies of Thomas Chatterton,' 8vo, pp. 88, 1784.
8. 'Poems supposed to have been written at Bristol by Thomas Rowley and others in the Fifteenth Century' (edited by Lancelot Sharpe), 8vo, pp. xxix, 329, 1794.
9. 'The Poetical Works of Thomas Chatterton,' Anderson s 'British Poets,' xi. 297–322, 1795.
10. 'The Revenge: a Burletta; with additional Songs, by Thomas Chatterton,' 8vo, pp. 47, 1795.
11. 'The Works of Thomas Chatterton' (edited by Robert Southey and Joseph Cottle), 3 vols. 8yo, 1803.
12. 'The Poetical Works of Thomas Chatterton' (edited by Charles B. Willcox), 2 vols. 12mo, 1842.
13. 'The Poetical Works of Thomas Chatterton' (edited by the Rev Walter Skeat, M.A.), Aldine edition, 2 vols. 8vo, 1876.

== See also ==
- List of 18th-century British working-class writers

== Bibliography ==
- Cook, Daniel. Thomas Chatterton and Neglected Genius, 1760–1830. Basingstoke and New York: Palgrave Macmillan, 2013.
- Cottle, Basil. Thomas Chatterton (Bristol Historical Association pamphlets, no. 6, 1963), 15 pp.
- Croft, Sir Herbert. Love and Madness. London: G Kearsly, 1780. <https://books.google.com/books?id=hDImAAAAMAAJ>
- Groom, Nick ed. Thomas Chatterton and romantic culture. London: Macmillan; New York: St. Martin's Press, 1999.
- Groom, Nick. "Chatterton, Thomas (1752–1770)". Oxford Dictionary of National Biography (online ed.). Oxford University Press. doi:10.1093/ref:odnb/5189. (Subscription, Wikipedia Library access or UK public library membership required.)
- Heys, Alistair ed. From Gothic to Romantic: Thomas Chatterton's Bristol. Bristol: Redcliffe, 2005.
- Haywood, Ian. The making of history: a study of the literary forgeries of James Macpherson and Thomas Chatterton in relation to eighteenth-century ideas of history and fiction. Rutherford: Fairleigh Dickinson University Press, c1986.
- Kaplan, Louise J. The Family Romance of the Impostor-poet Thomas Chatterton. Berkeley and Los Angeles: University of California Press, 1989. <https://books.google.com/books?id=EZGHZv8-0bYC>
- Kroese, Irvin B.. "Chatterton's Aella and Chatterton." SEL: Studies in English Literature 1500–1900. XII.3 (1972):557-66. JSTOR 449952
- Meyerstein, Edward Harry William. A Life of Thomas Chatterton. London: Ingpen and Grant, 1930.
- Németh, T. (2012). Thomas Chatterton's An excelente balade of charitie interpreted as a dream (Unpublished bachelor's thesis). Pázmány Péter Katolikus Egyetem Bölcsészet- és Társadalomtudományi Kar, Piliscsaba, Hungary.
