= Feu! Chatterton =

French rock band

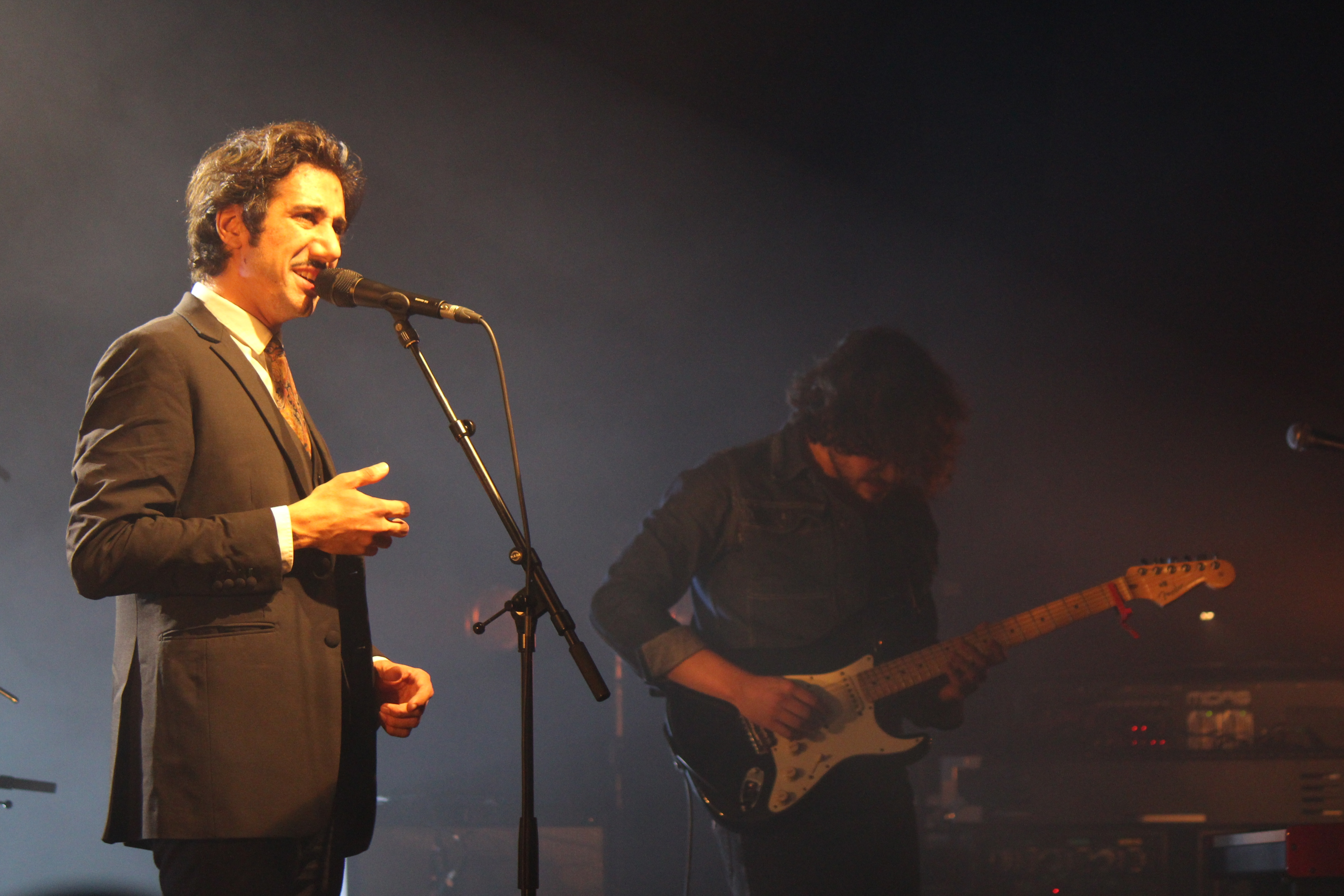
- Arthur Teboul and Clément Doumic of Feu! Chatterton performing in 2015

Background information
- Origin: Paris, France
- Genres: Rock; pop; chanson; spoken word
- Years active: 2011–present
- Members: Arthur Teboul; Antoine Wilson; Clément Doumic; Raphaël De Pressigny; Sébastien Wolf
- Website: feuchatterton.fr

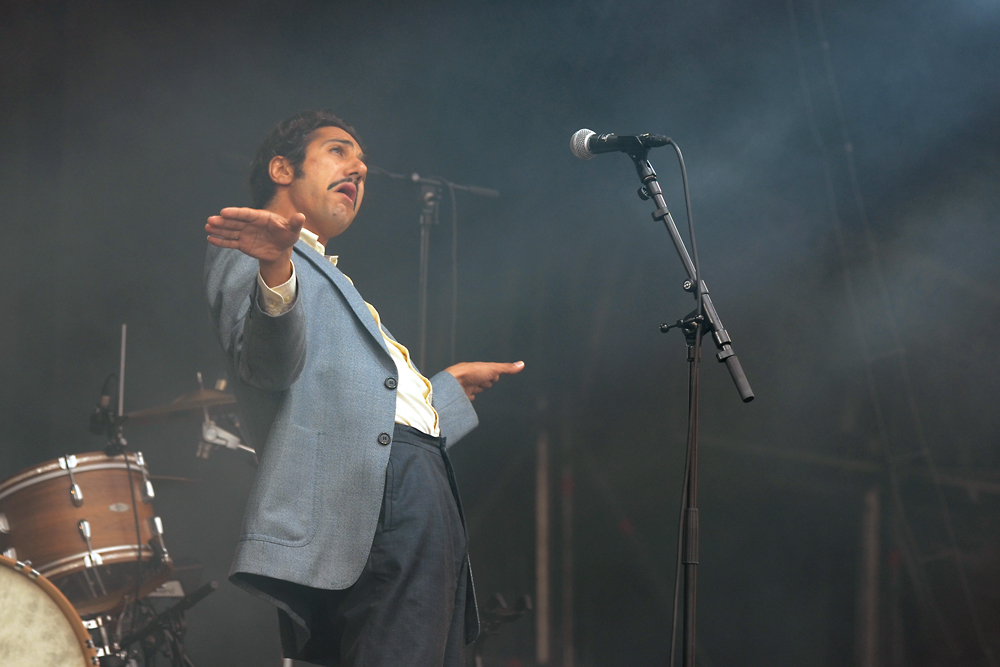
Arthur Teboul of Feu! Chatterton in 2016

Feu! Chatterton is a French pop/rock band from Paris formed in 2011 by singer Arthur Teboul. Their name is an homage to the poet Thomas Chatterton.

== Career ==
Feu! Chatterton was formed in 2011 by singer Arthur Teboul, and its lineup includes Antoine Wilson on bass, Clément Doumic on guitars and keyboards, Raphaël De Pressigny on drums, and Sébastien Wolf on guitars and keyboards. Teboul was inspired by the French singers Léo Ferré, George Brassens, and Serge Gainsbourg, and the band was influenced by rock artists such as Neil Young and Radiohead.

In 2015, they released their debut album, the critically acclaimed Ici le jour (a tout enseveli), having previously issued the EPs Feu! Chatterton (2014) and Bic Medium (2015). They followed it with L'Oiseleur in 2018 and Palais d'argile in 2021.

== Band members ==
- Arthur Teboul – vocals
- Antoine Wilson – bass
- Clément Doumic – guitars, keyboards
- Raphaël De Pressigny – drums
- Sébastien Wolf – guitars, keyboards

== Discography ==
Studio albums

- Ici le Jour (a tout enseveli) (fr) (2015)
- L'Oiseleur (fr) (2018)
- Palais d'argile (fr) (2021)
- Labyrinthe (fr) (2025)

EPs

- Feu! Chatterton (2014)
- Bic Medium (2015)

Live albums

- Feu! Chatterton Live 2018 (2019)
