= Portrait of John Gibson Lockhart =

Painting by Francis Grant

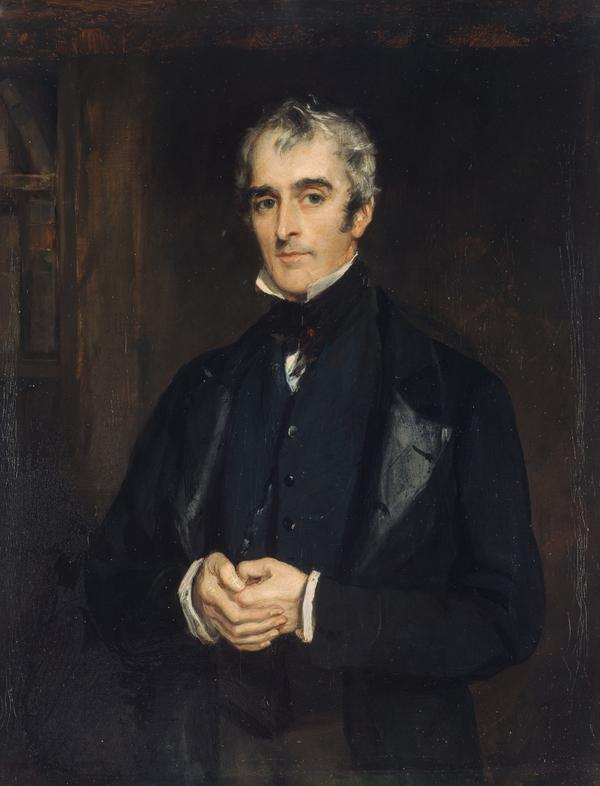
- Artist: Francis Grant
- Year: 1850
- Type: Oil on canvas, portrait painting
- Dimensions: 32.3 cm × 25.4 cm (12.7 in × 10.0 in)
- Location: Scottish National Portrait Gallery, Edinburgh

Portrait of John Gibson Lockhart is an 1850 portrait painting by the British artist Francis Grant. It depicts the Scottish writer and editor John Gibson Lockhart. The son-in-law of Sir Walter Scott, Lockhart was known for his novels and his 1838 biography of Scott. Grant was a fellow Scot, who had moved to England and become known for his hunting scenes and fashionable society portraits and was later elected President of the Royal Academy. He encounter Gibson earlier in his career when he was painting Walter Scott.

The work was displayed at the Royal Academy Exhibition of 1855 at the National Gallery in London. Today the picture is in the collection of the Scottish National Portrait Gallery, in Edinburgh, having been acquired in 1952. A mezzotint was produced based on the painting by James Faed in 1856.

== Bibliography ==
- Caw, James Lewis. Scottish Portraits: With an Historical and Critical Introduction and Notes. Caxton Publishing Company, 1903.
- Wills, Catherine. High Society: The Life and Art of Sir Francis Grant, 1803–1878. National Galleries of Scotland, 2003.
