= A North Sea Breeze on the Dutch Coast =

Painting by Edward William Cooke

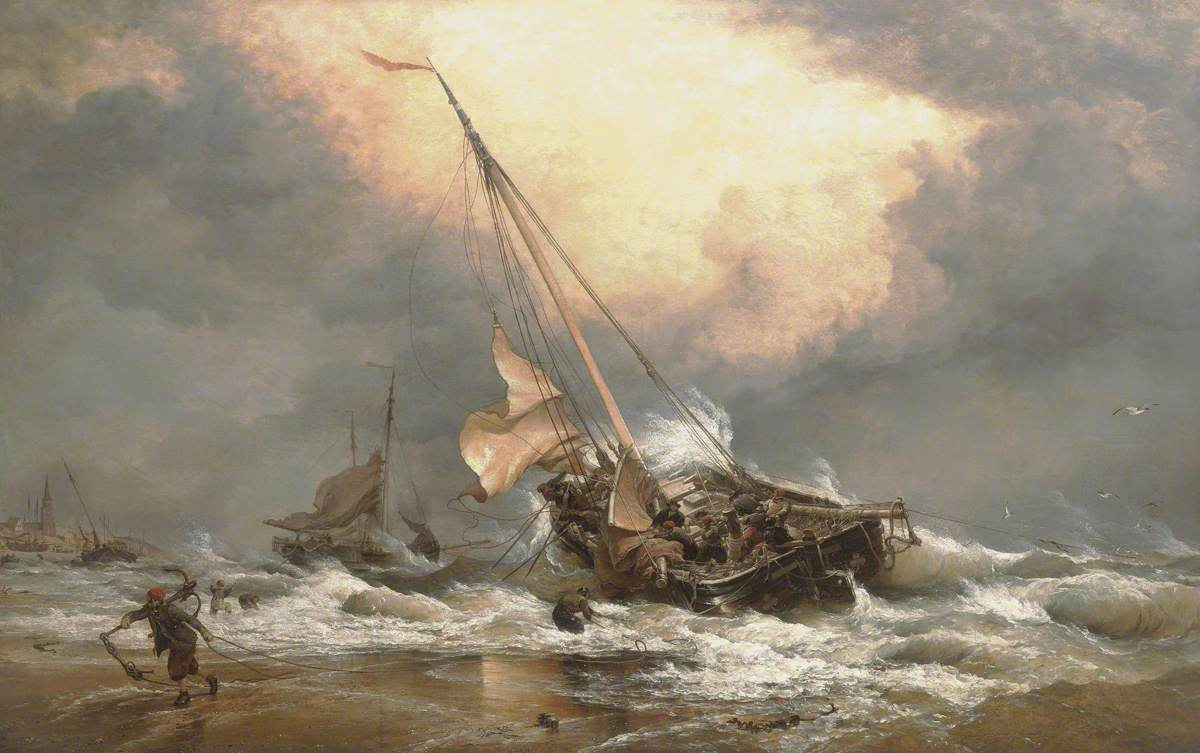
- Artist: Edward William Cooke
- Year: 1855
- Type: Oil on canvas, maritime painting
- Dimensions: 106.6 cm × 167.6 cm (42.0 in × 66.0 in)
- Location: National Maritime Museum, Greenwich

A North Sea Breeze on the Dutch Coast is an 1855 oil painting by the British artist Edward William Cooke. A seascape, it blends elements of landscape and genre painting. It depicts a scene at Scheveningen on the North Sea coast, with a group of fisherman hauling ashore their vessel during a strong wind.

Cooke was a protégé of Clarkson Stanfield and became known for his romantic paintings of coastal scenes, many of them set in the Netherlands. The painting was displayed at the Royal Academy Exhibition of 1855 at the National Gallery in London. Today it is in the collection of the National Maritime Museum, in Greenwich.

== Bibliography ==
- Bury, Stephen (ed.) Benezit Dictionary of British Graphic Artists and Illustrators, Volume 1. OUP, 2012.
- Isham, Howard F. Image of the Sea: Oceanic Consciousness in the Romantic Century. Peter Lang, 2004.
- Munday, John. Edward William Cooke: A Man of His Time. Antique Collectors' Club, 1996.
