= Portrait of Sir Edwin Landseer =

Painting by Francis Grant

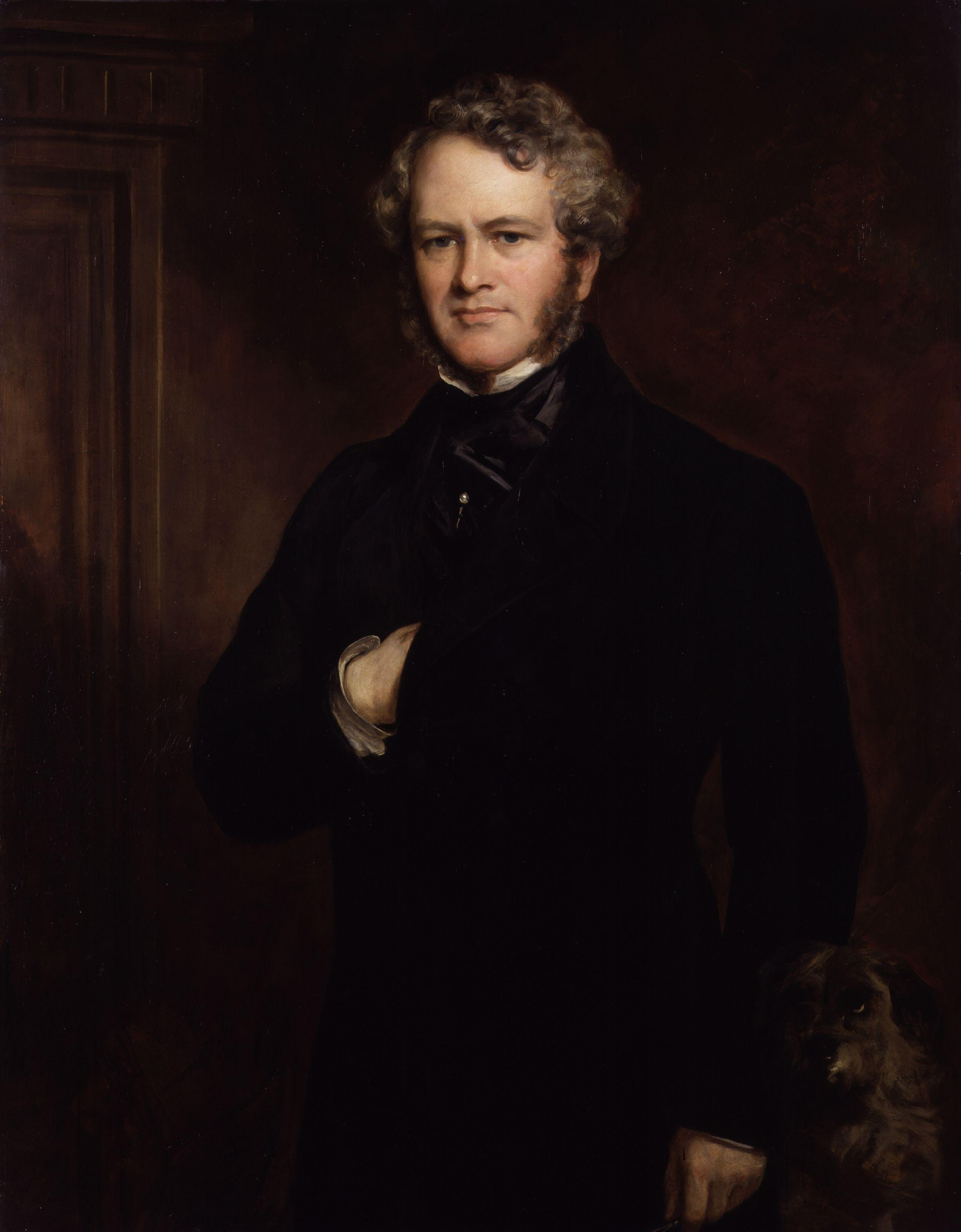
- Artist: Francis Grant
- Year: 1852
- Type: Oil on canvas, portrait
- Dimensions: 290 cm × 227 cm (114.3 in × 89.2 in)
- Location: National Portrait Gallery, London

Portrait of Sir Edwin Landseer is a portrait painting of 1852 by the British artist Francis Grant depicting his fellow painter Sir Edwin Landseer. It is held at the National Portrait Gallery, in London.

== History and description ==
Landseer was noted for his paintings featuring animals. His portrait by Grant was commissioned by the shipbuilder and art collector William Wells, who was a friend of Landseer and owned a number of his works. Grant was a leading portraitist of the early Victorian era and went on to serve as President of the Royal Academy, after Landseer had turned down the position. He may have changed his original conception of the painting during the preparation. An earlier version shows Landseer standing by an easel holding a palette to emphasise his profession as an artist. In contrast, the conventional stance of the final work more closely resembles that of a businessman.

The painting was exhibited at the Royal Academy's Summer Exhibition of 1855. Today it is in the collection of the National Portrait Gallery, having been presented by the Marquis de Rochefort-Luçay in 1890.

== Bibliography ==
- Donald, Diana. Picturing Animals in Britain, 1750–1850. Yale University Press, 2007.
- Ormond, Richard. Early Victorian Portraits, National Portrait Gallery, 1974.
- Wills, Catherine. High Society: The Life and Art of Sir Francis Grant, 1803–1878. National Galleries of Scotland, 2003.
