= At the Opera (Frith) =

Painting by William Powell Frith

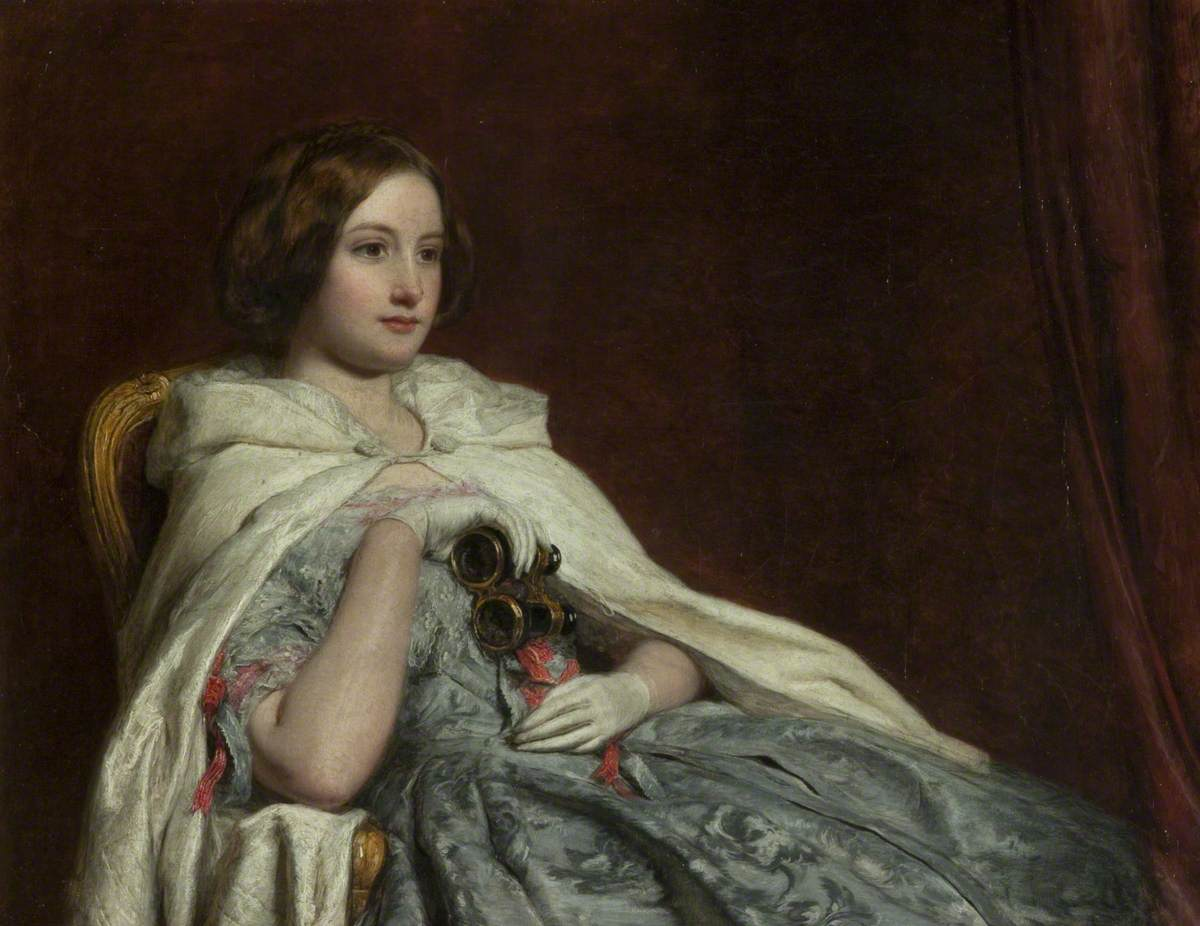
- Artist: William Powell Frith
- Year: 1855
- Type: Oil on canvas, genre painting
- Dimensions: 34.9 cm × 45 cm (13.7 in × 18 in)
- Location: Harris Museum, Preston

At the Opera is an oil on canvas painting by the British artist William Powell Frith, from 1855. It is held at the Harris Museum, in Preston.

== Description ==
It depicts a young woman seated in box in an opera house, with a wrap around her shoulders and clutching a pair of opera glasses. Rather than a portrait painting, it depicts an artist's model as a generalised type of fashionable beauty of the Victorian era. The picture was admired by Prince Albert.

Although Frith became known for his large, bustling scenes of everyday life such as The Derby Day and The Railway Station, he also produced many smaller, more intimate works such as this. The picture was displayed at the Royal Academy Exhibition of 1855 in London Today it is in the collection of the Harris Museum of Preston, in Lancashire, having been donated in 1883 by the Preston-born lawyer Richard Newsham.

== Bibliography ==
- Bills, Mark & Knight, Vivien (ed.) William Powell Frith: Painting the Victorian Age. Yale University Press, 2006
- Wood, Christopher. William Powell Frith: A Painter and His World. Sutton Publishing, 2006.
- Wright, Joanne. The Pursuit of Leisure: Victorian Depictions of Pastimes. Djanogly Art Gallery, 1997.
