= Royal Academy Exhibition of 1855 =

1855 art exhibition in London

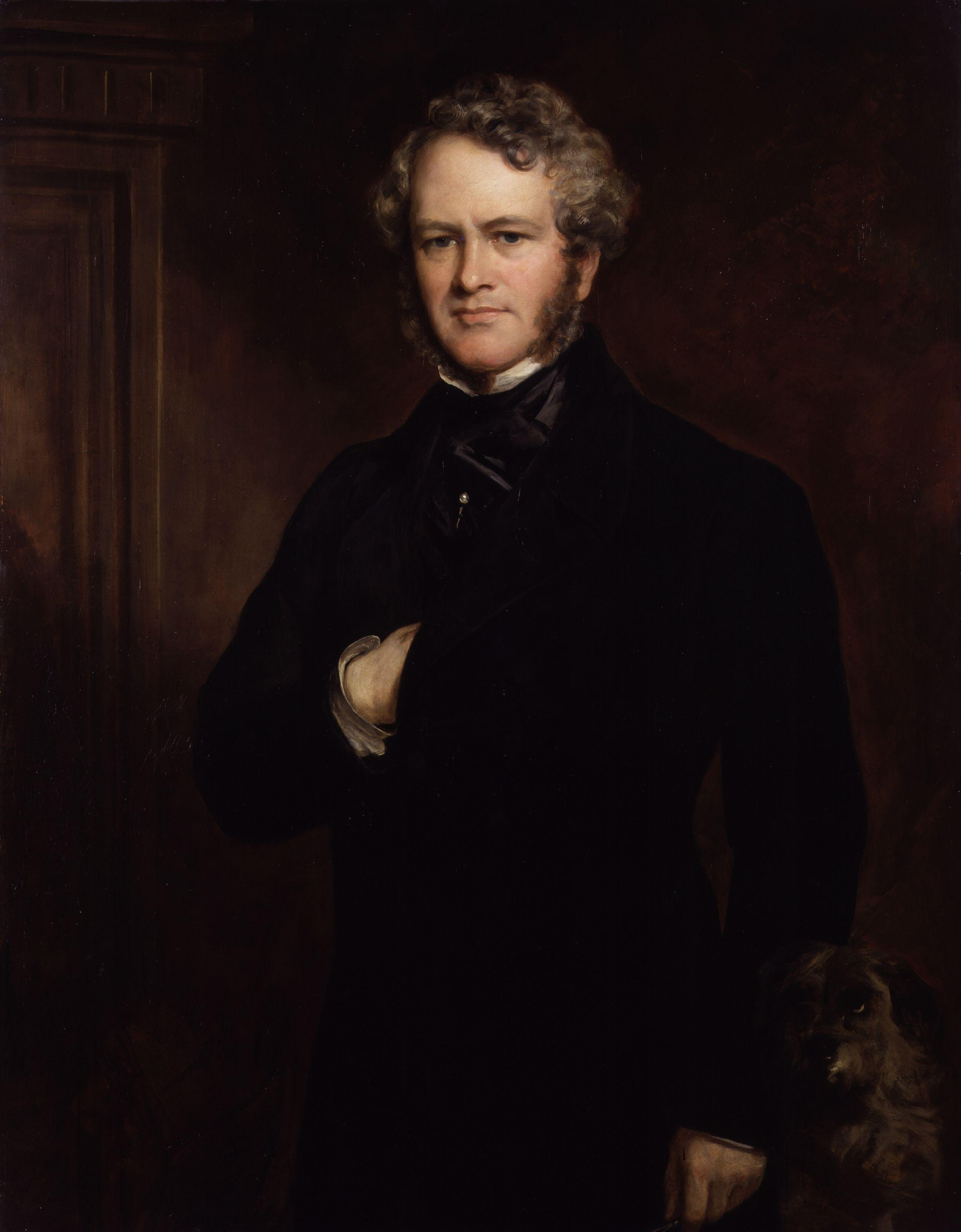
Portrait of Edwin Landseer by Francis Grant

The Royal Academy Exhibition of 1855 was the eighty seventh annual Summer Exhibition of the British Royal Academy of Arts. It was held at the National Gallery in London between 7 May and 28 July 1855. Showcasing submissions from artists and architects of the Victorian era, it took place amidst the ongoing Crimean War. Critics generally considered the year's submissions to be an overall disappointment, including the absence of several established painters. Works that did attract praise included Cimabue's Celebrated Madonna by Frederic Leighton and The Rescue by John Everett Millais. Augustus Egg's The Life and Death of Buckingham also attracted notice, featuring two paintings based on the Restoration rake and politician the Duke of Buckingham.

Amongst other works on display were Frederick Richard Pickersgill's Britomart Unarming. George Jones exhibited depictions of the recent Battle of the Alma and Battle of Balaclava during the Crimean conflict. Francis Grant displayed his usual series of portraits including John Gibson Lockhart. His Portrait of Edwin Landseer depicted his fellow artist Edwin Landseer. William Powell Frith and other members of The Clique submitted a series of works with John Phillip's Spanish-set El Paseo commissioned by Queen Victoria.

The landscape and maritime painting tradition was carried on by figures such as Thomas Creswick, Edward William Cooke and William Havell. Clarkson Stanfield displayed The Siege of San Sebastian.

== Gallery ==
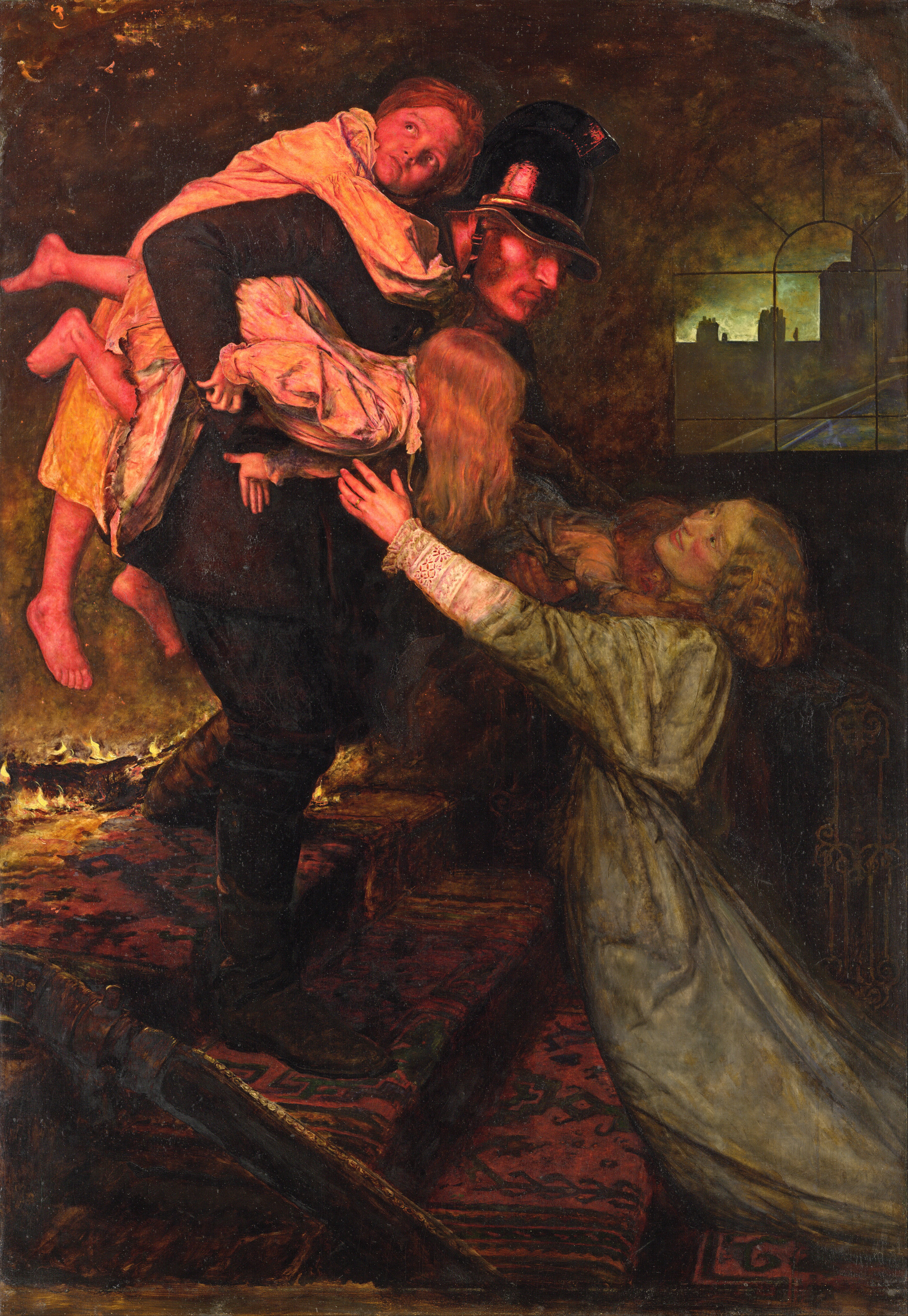
The Rescue by John Everett Millais

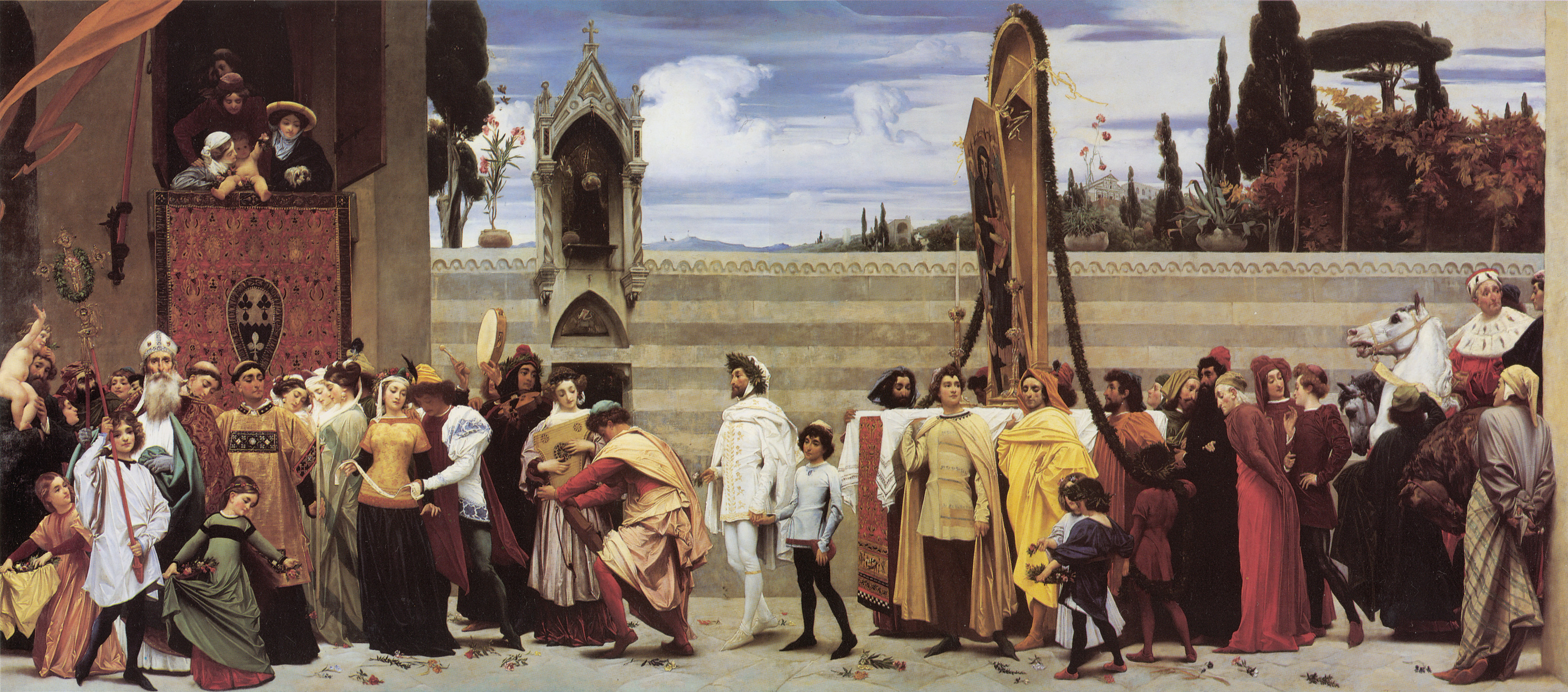
Cimabue's Celebrated Madonna by Frederic Leighton

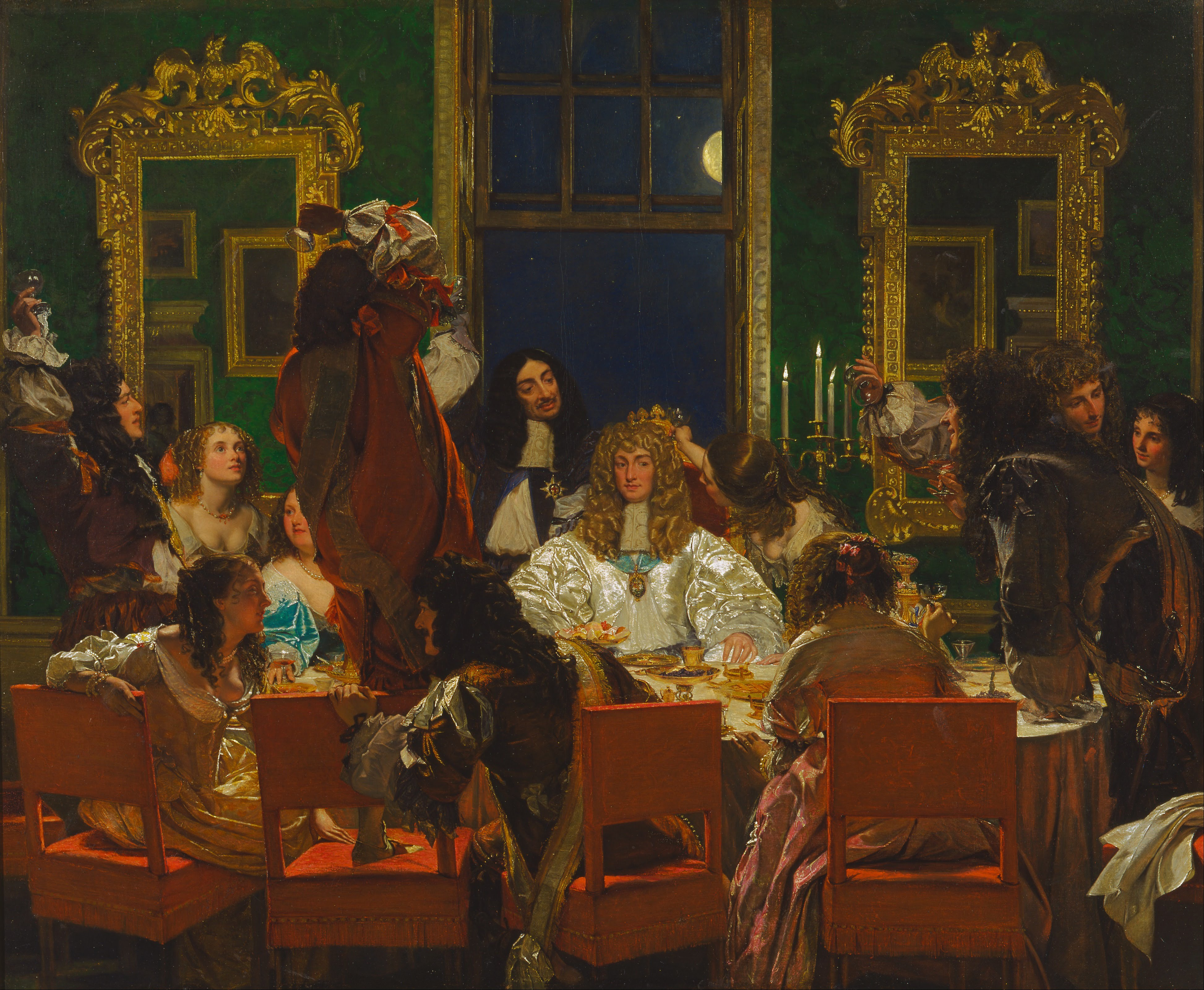
The Life of Buckingham by Augustus Egg

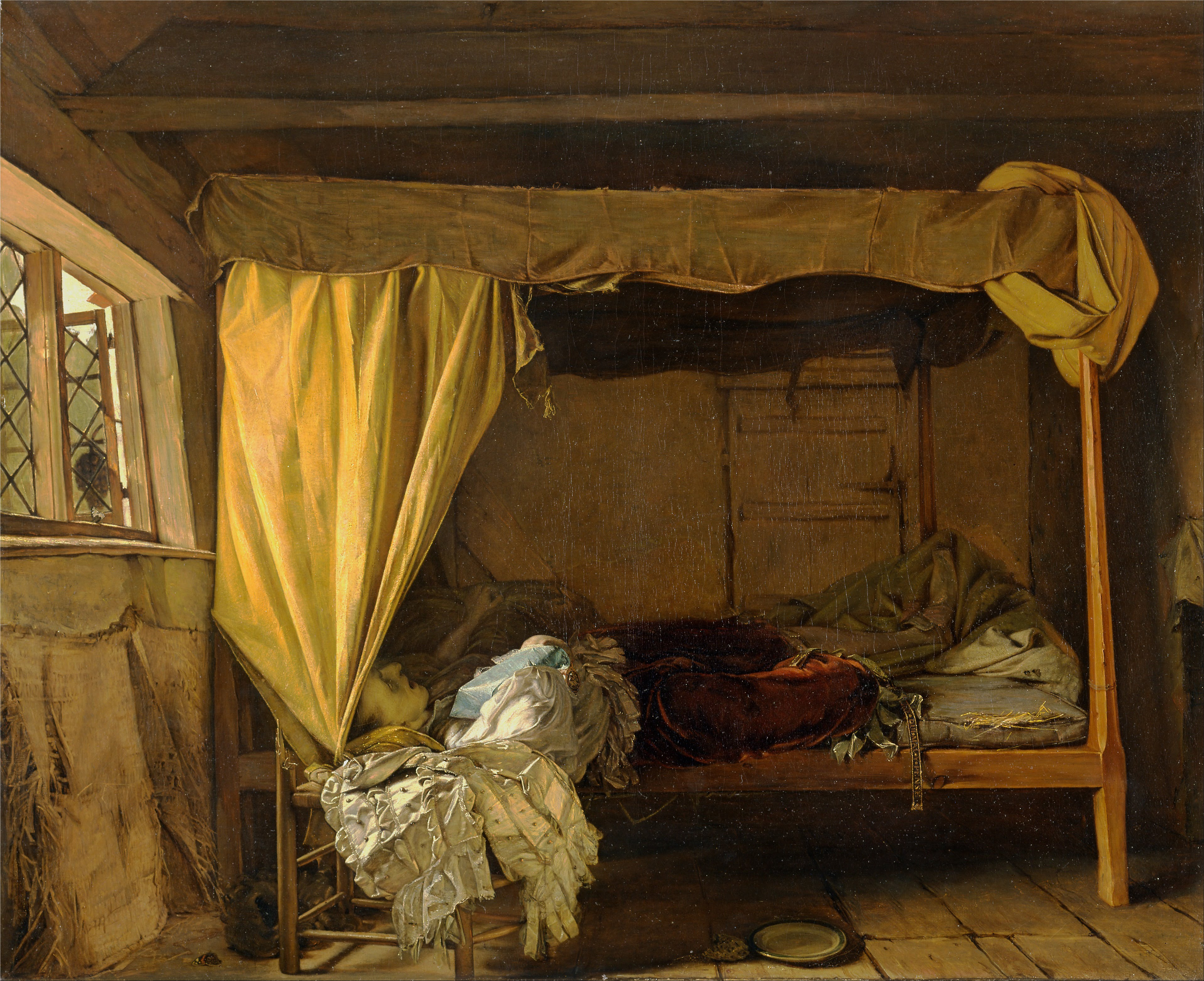
The Death of Buckingham by Augustus Egg

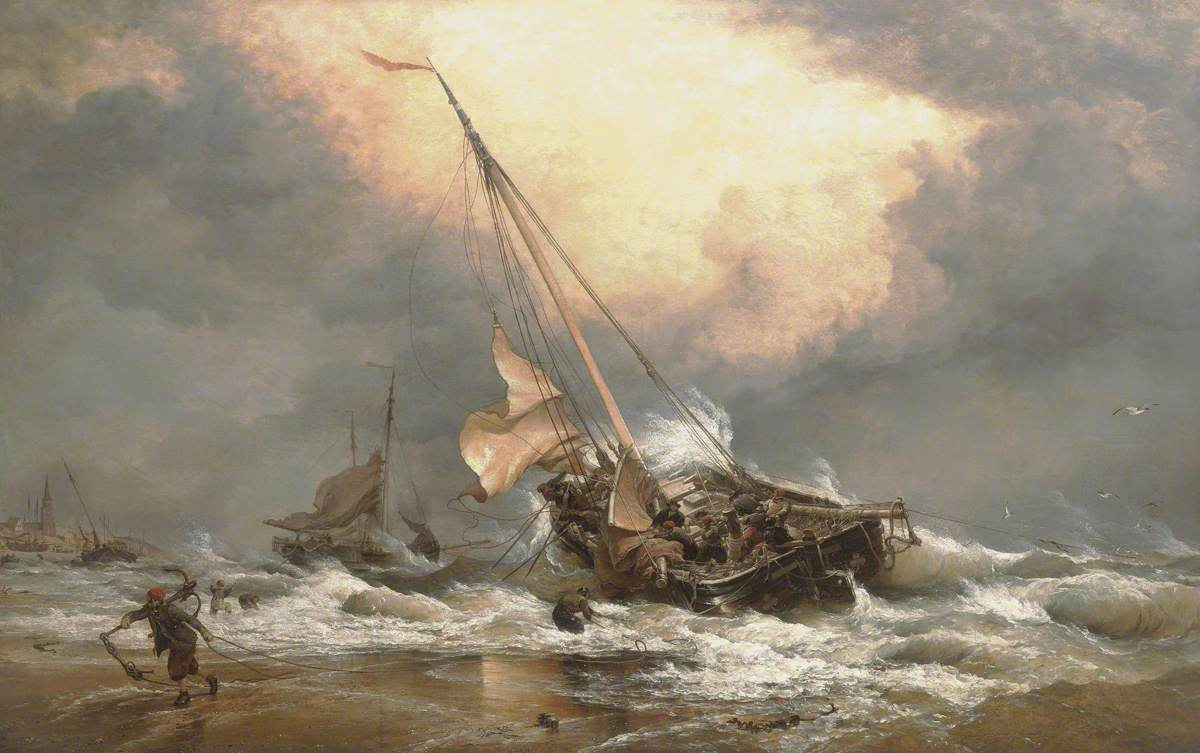
A North Sea Breeze on the Dutch Coast by Edward William Cooke

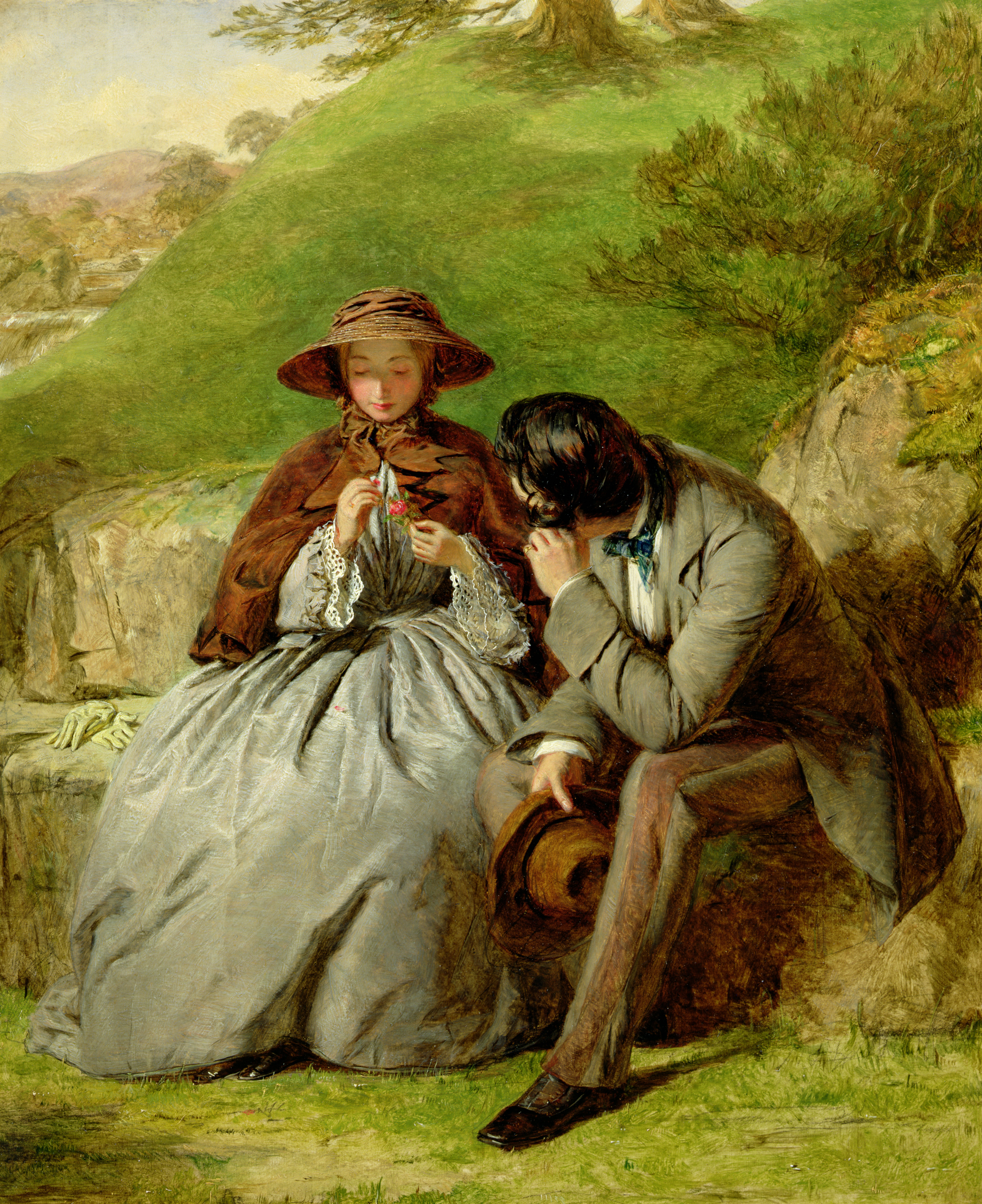
The Lovers by William Powell Frith

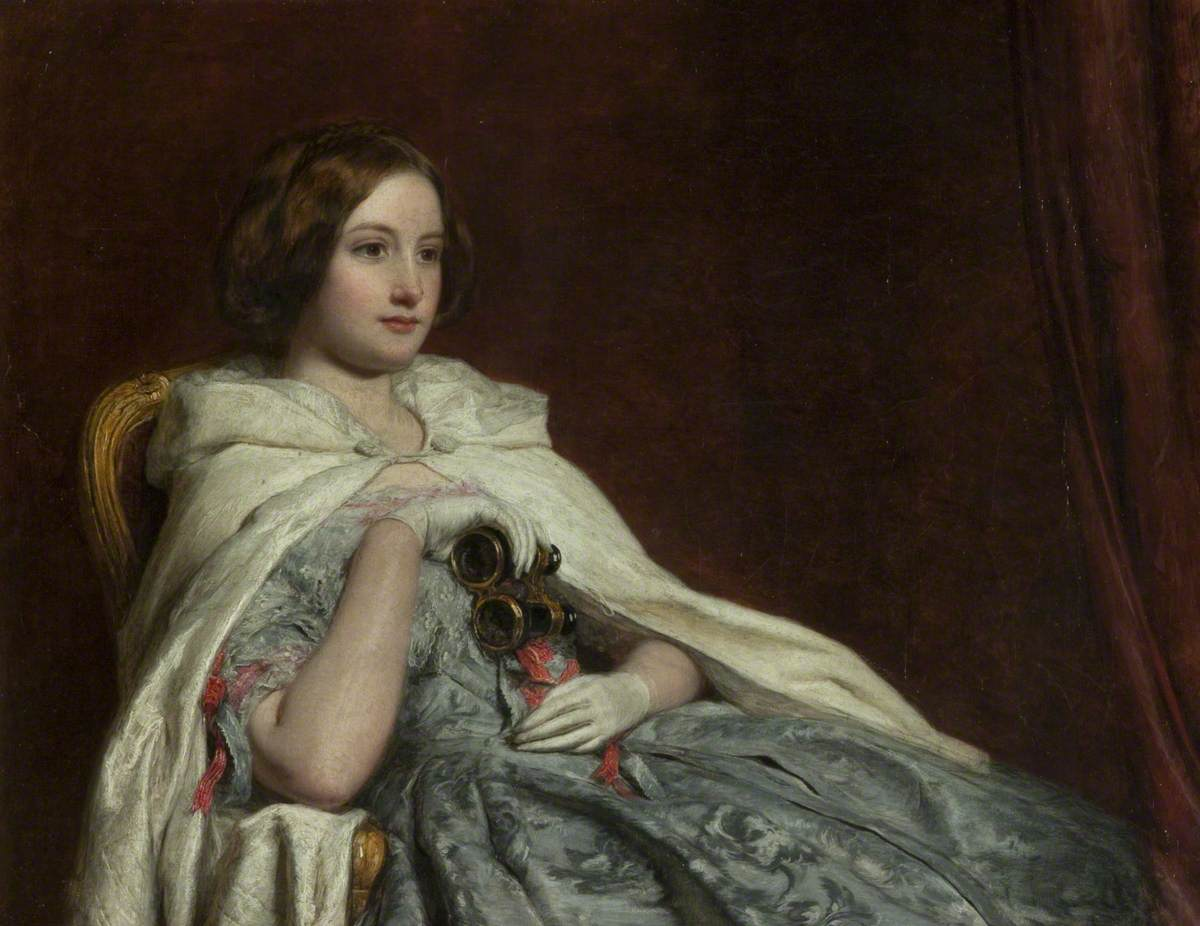
At the Opera by William Powell Frith

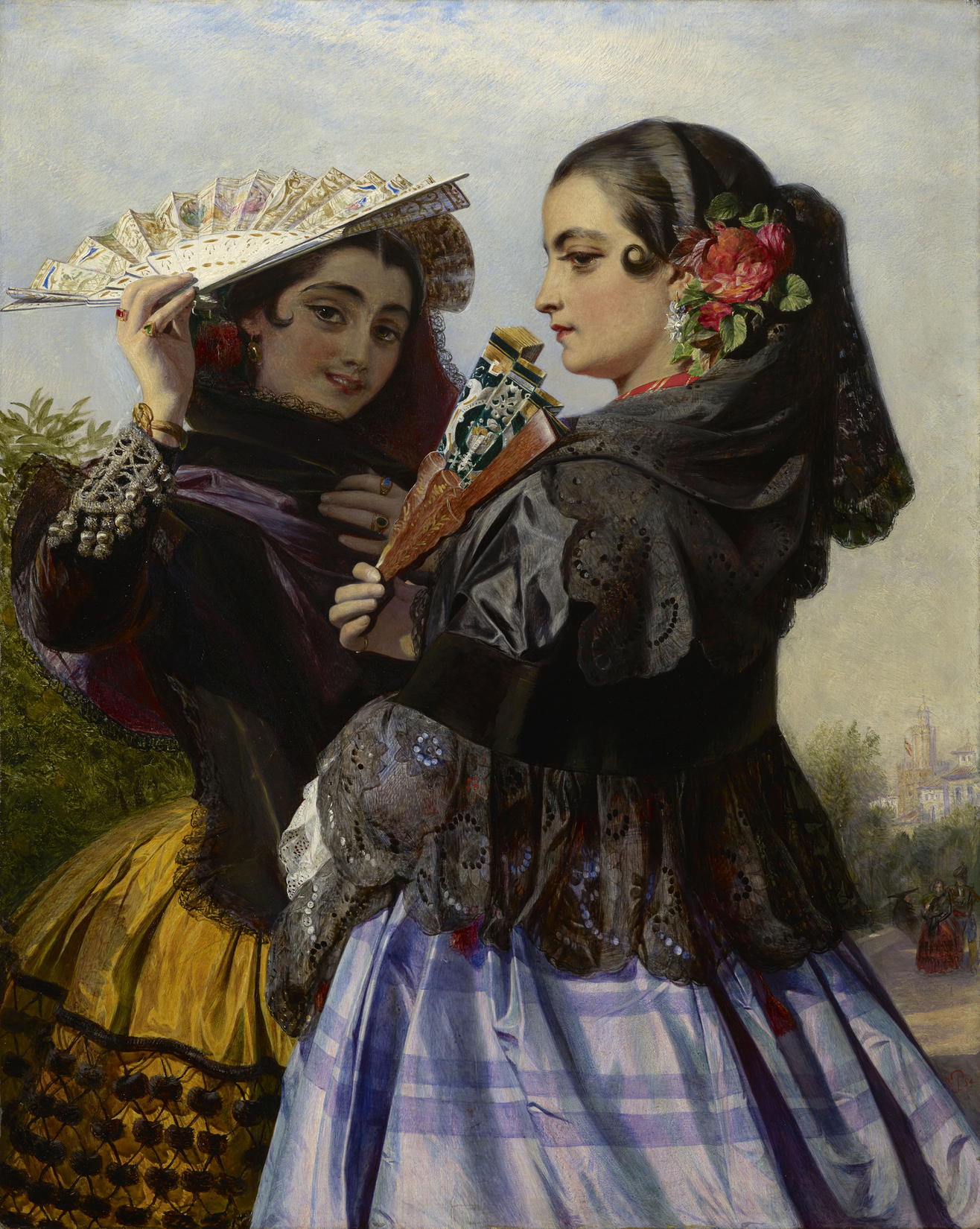
El Paseo by John Phillip

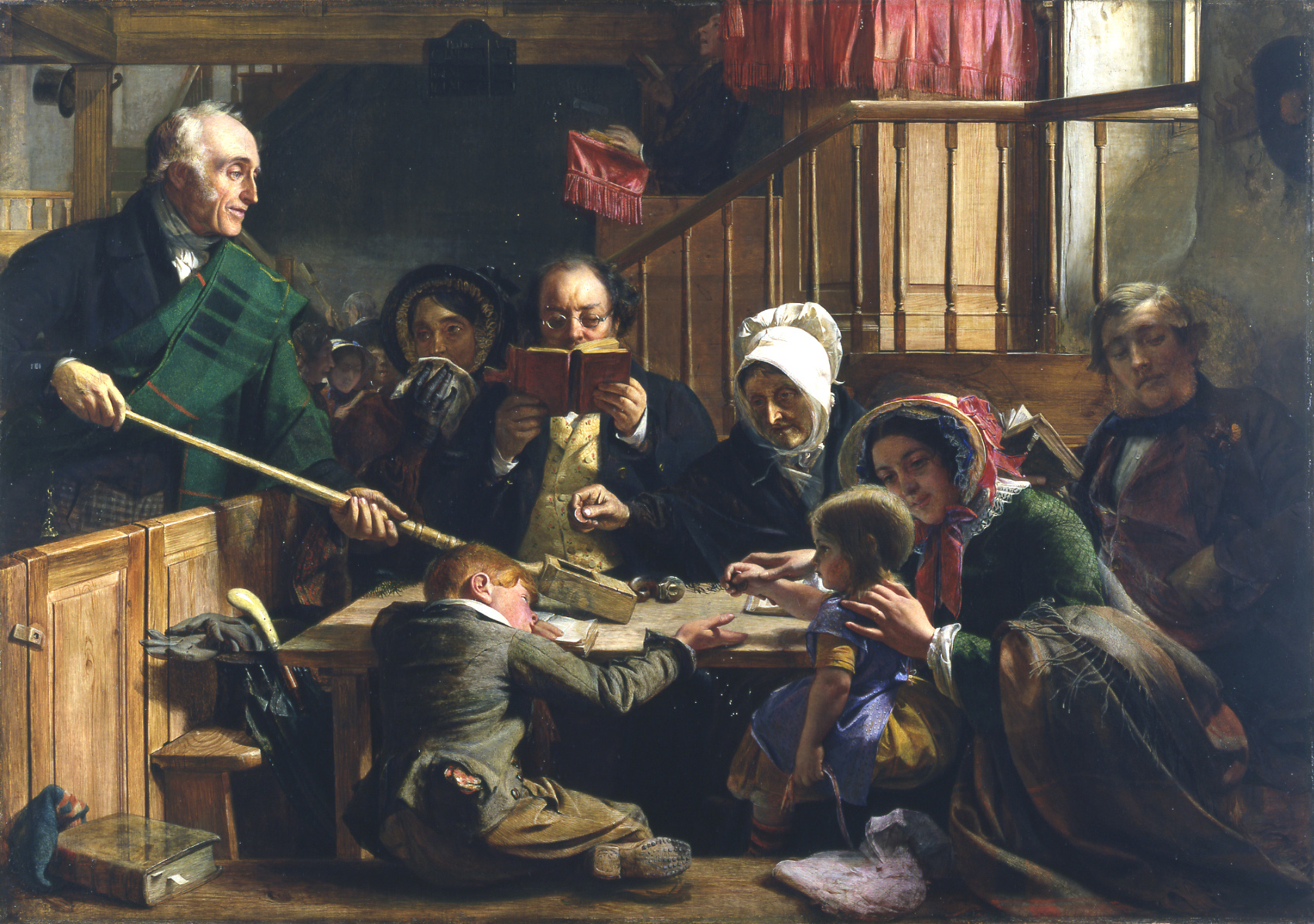
Collecting the Offering in a Scottish Kirk by John Phillip

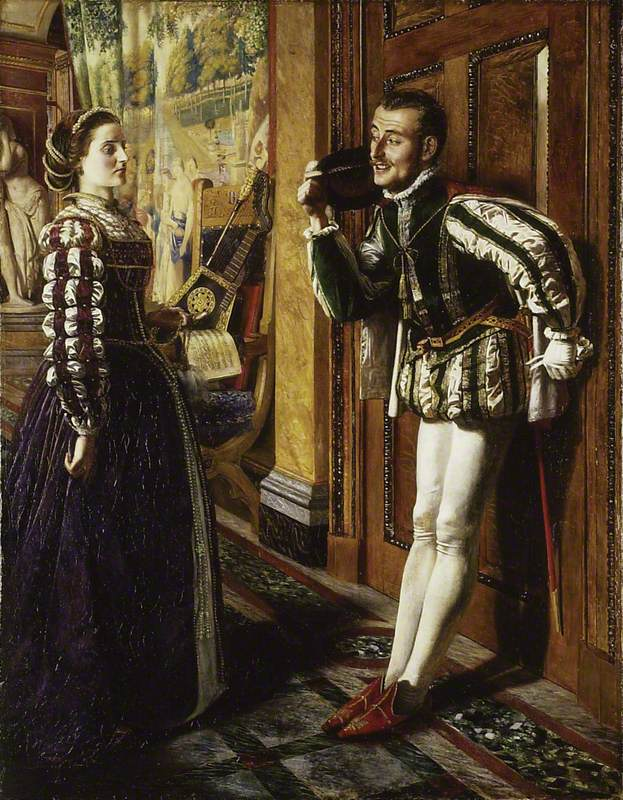
Katherine and Petruchio by Robert Braithwaite Martineau

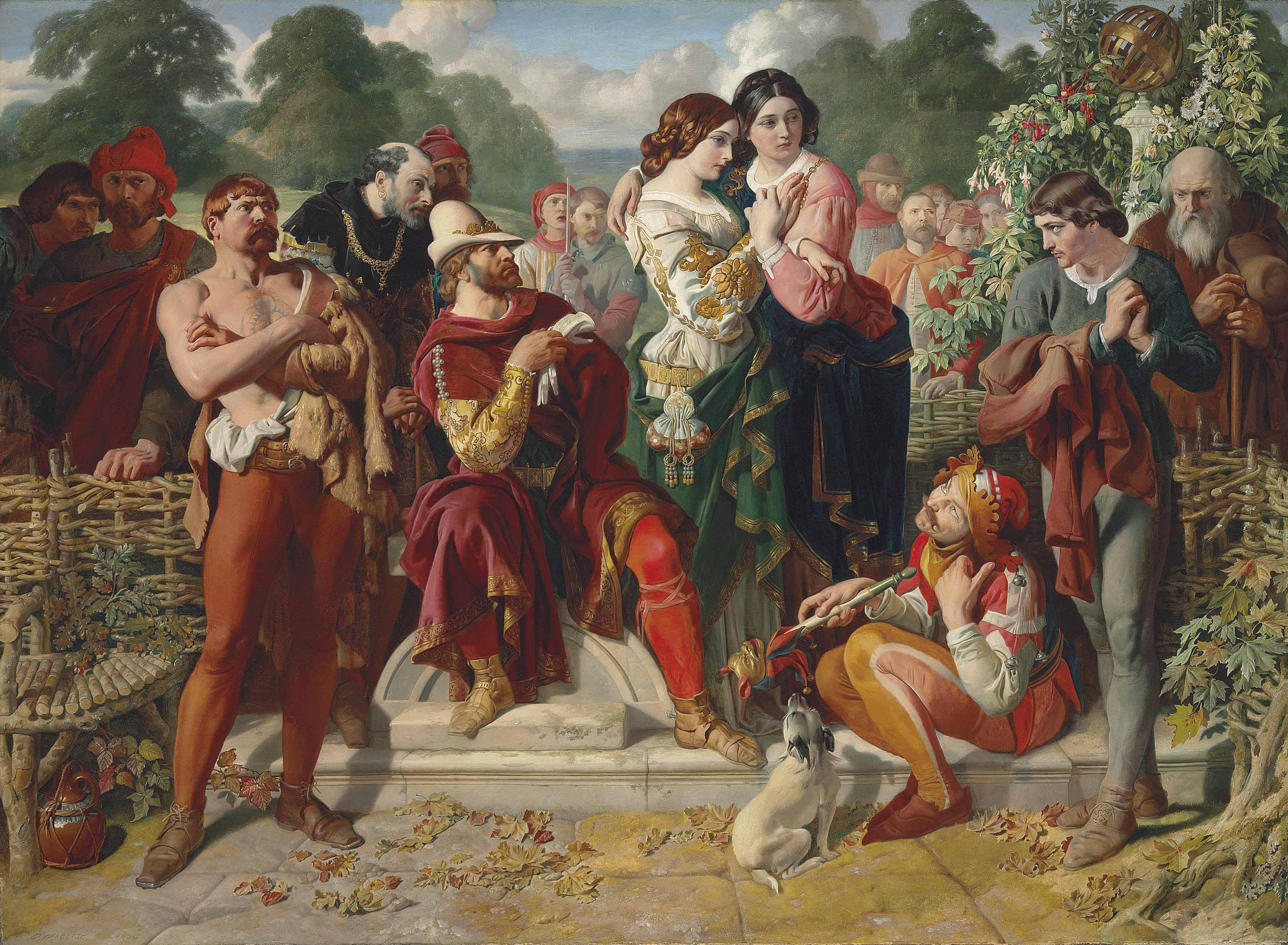
The Wrestling Scene in As You Like It by Daniel Maclise

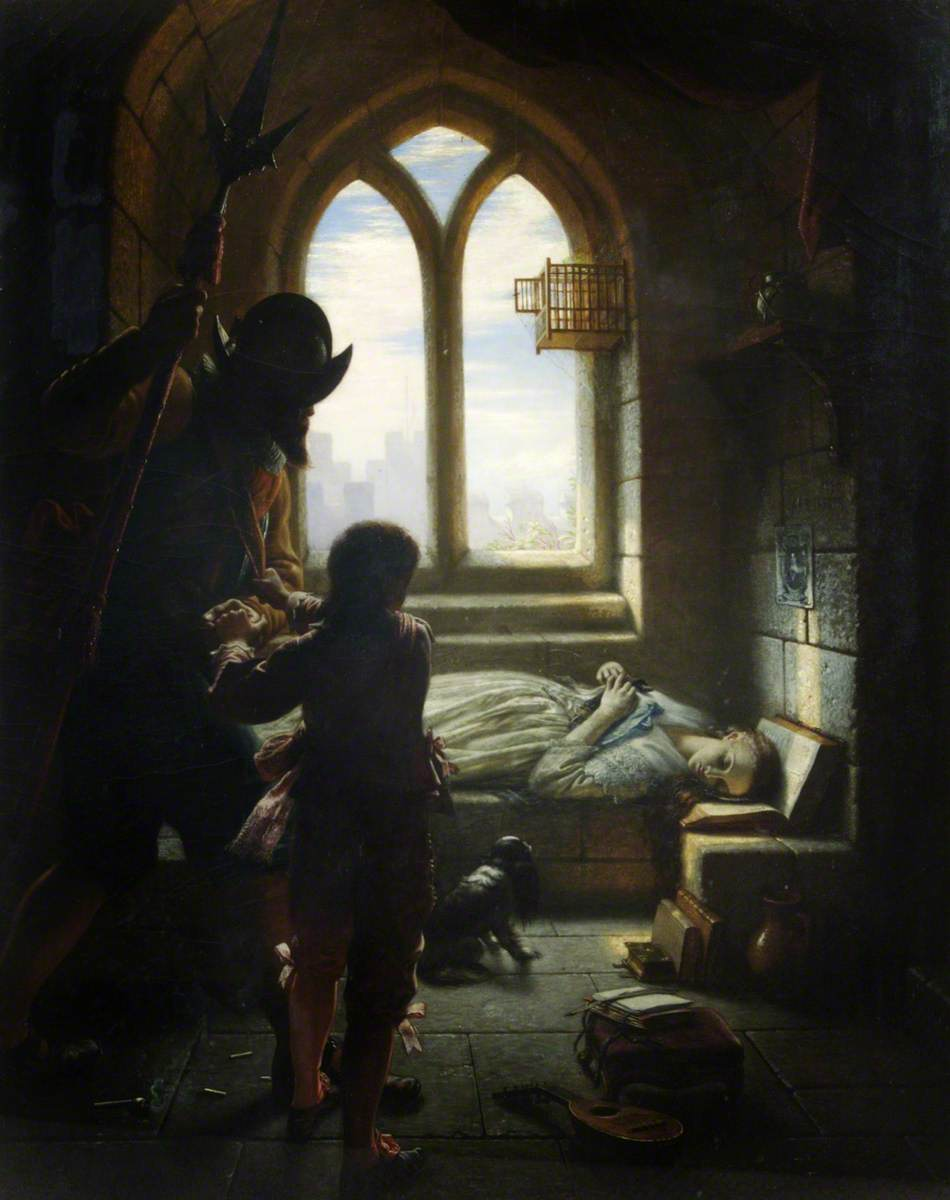
The Royal Prisoners at Carisbrooke Castle by Charles West Cope

A Scene on Duddingston Loch, near Edinburgh by Charles Lees

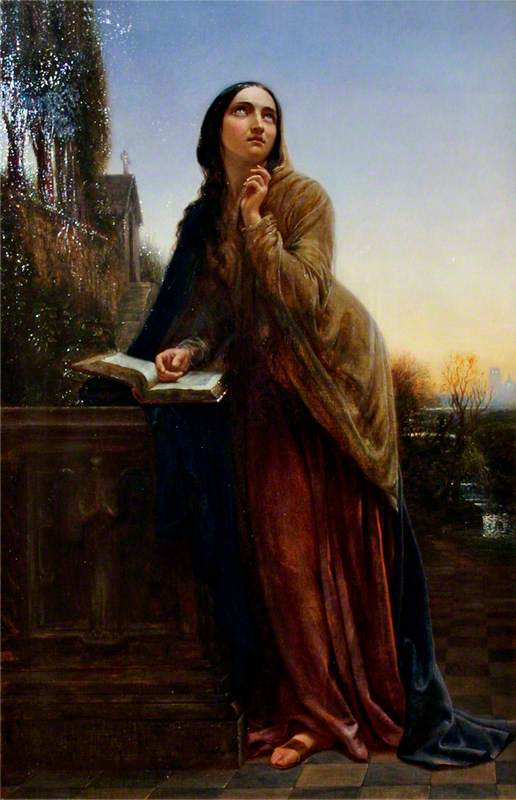
Il Penseroso by Charles West Cope

The Sylvan Spring by Richard Redgrave

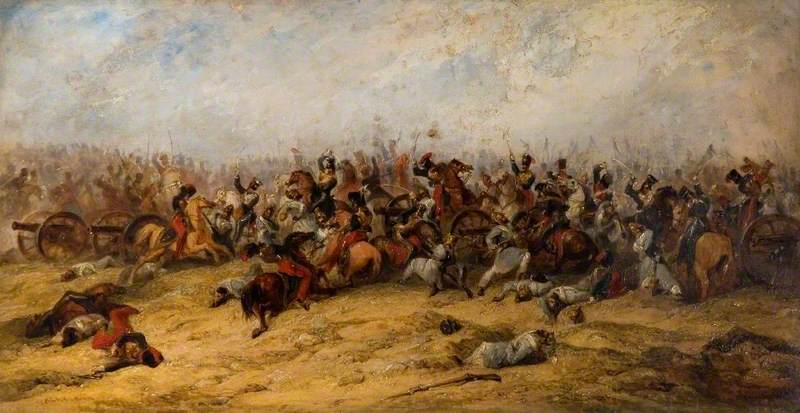
The Conflict at the Guns, Balaclava by George Jones

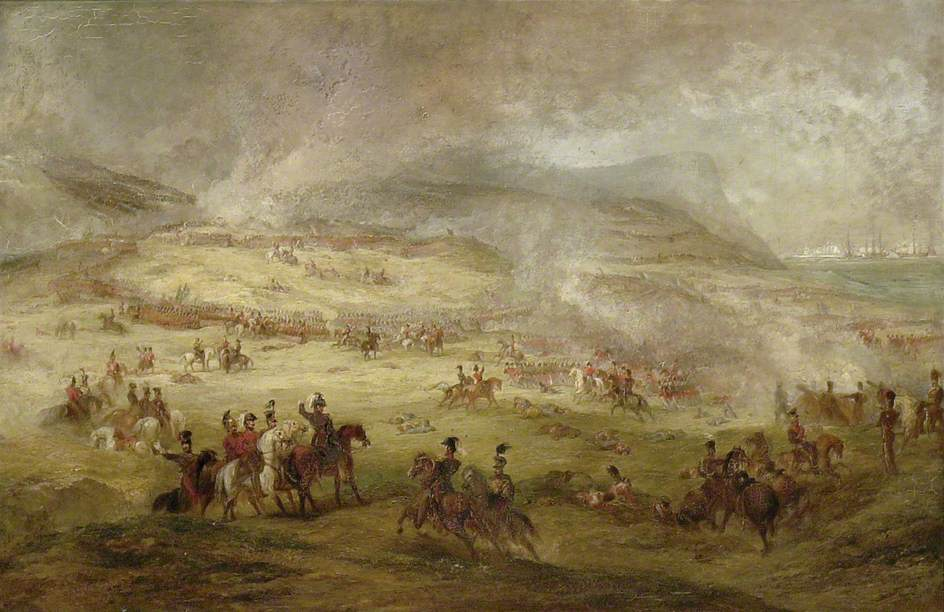
The Battle of the Alma by George Jones

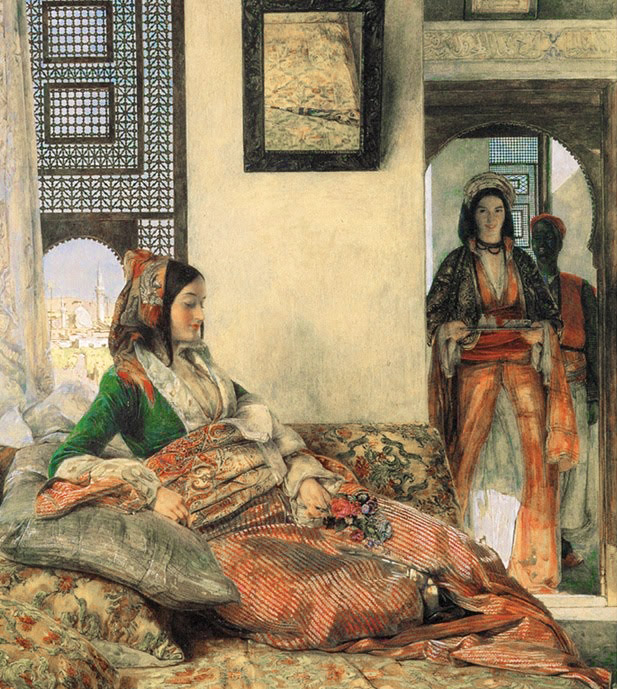
An Armenian Lady in Cairo by John Frederick Lewis

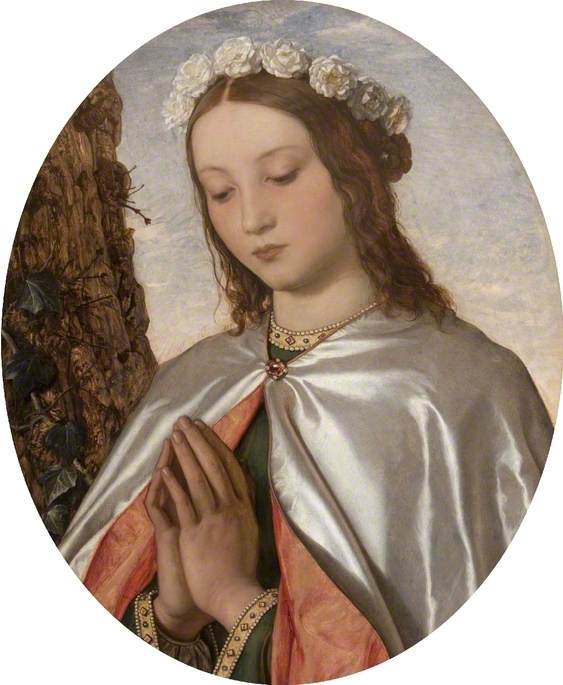
Christabel by William Dyce

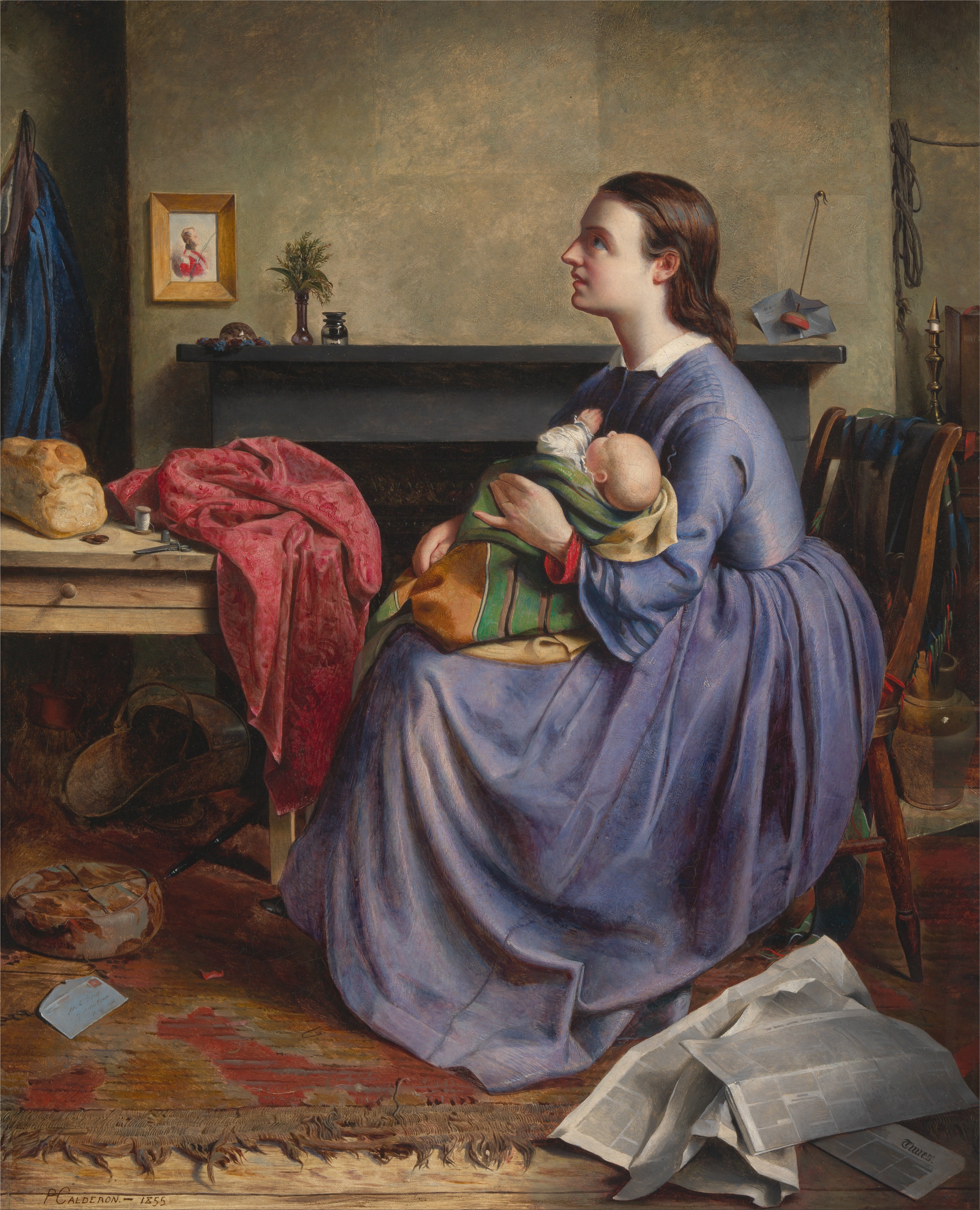
Lord, Thy Will Be Done by Philip Hermogenes Calderon

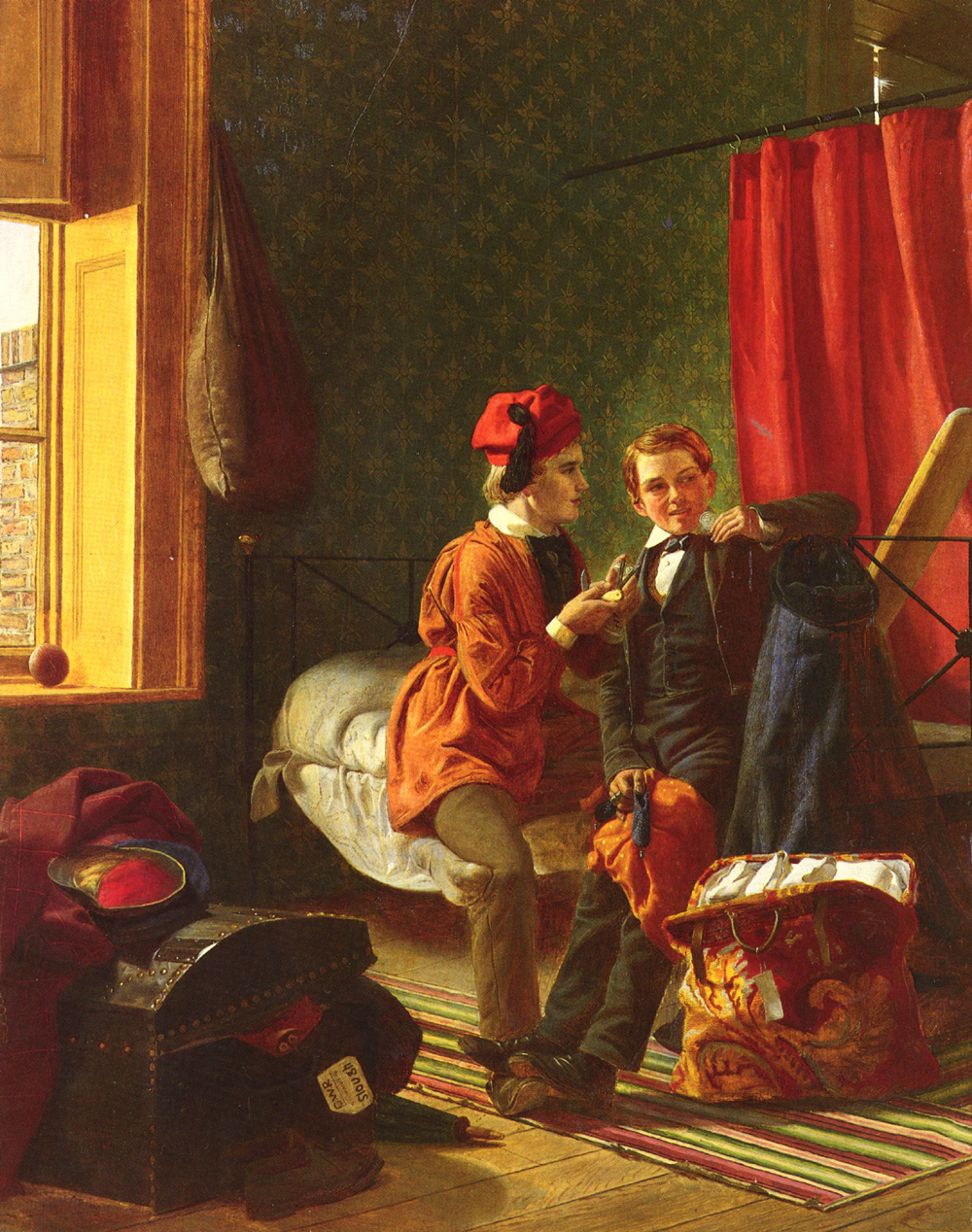
Temptation by James Collinson

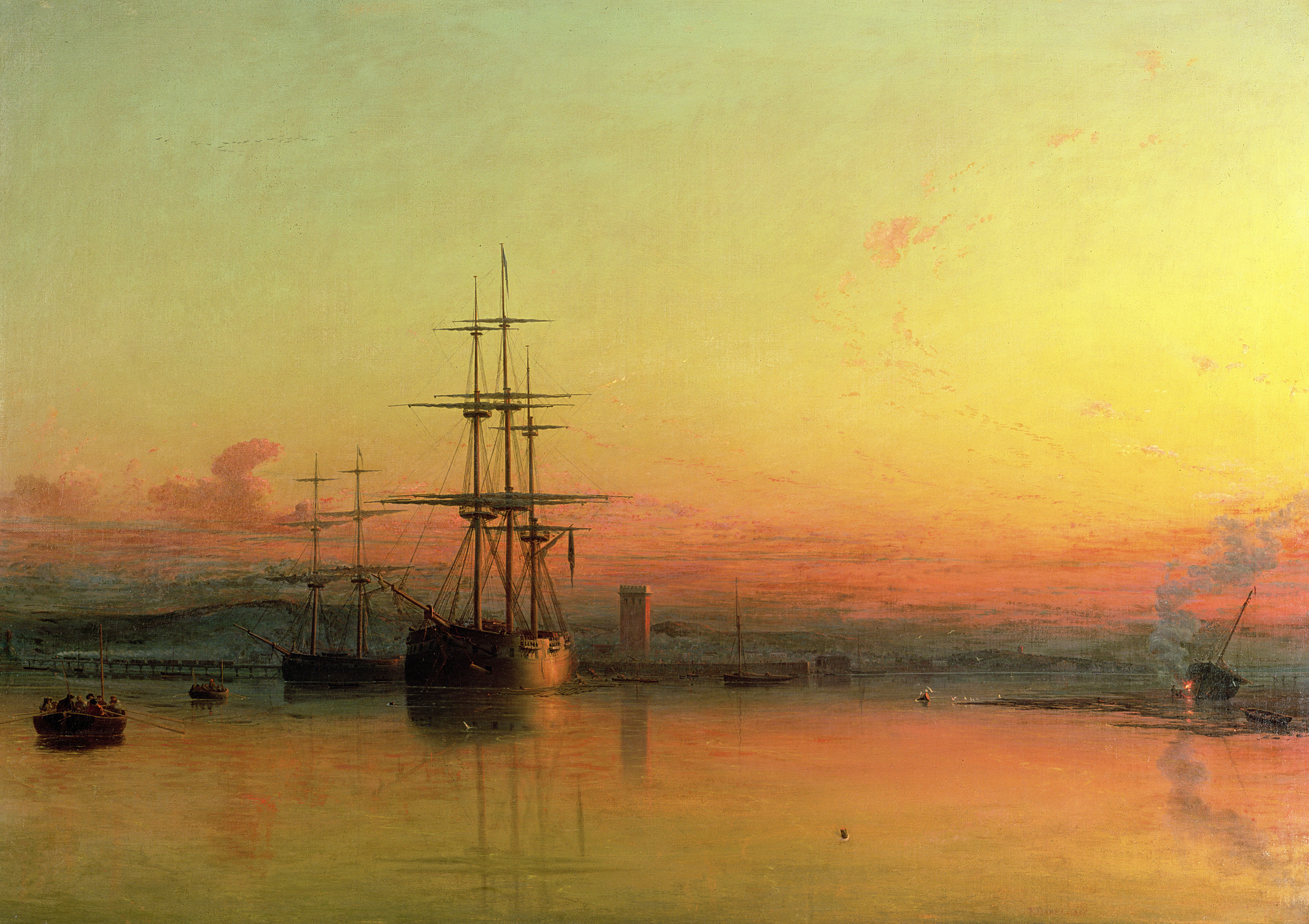
Sunset at the Bight of Exmouth by Francis Danby

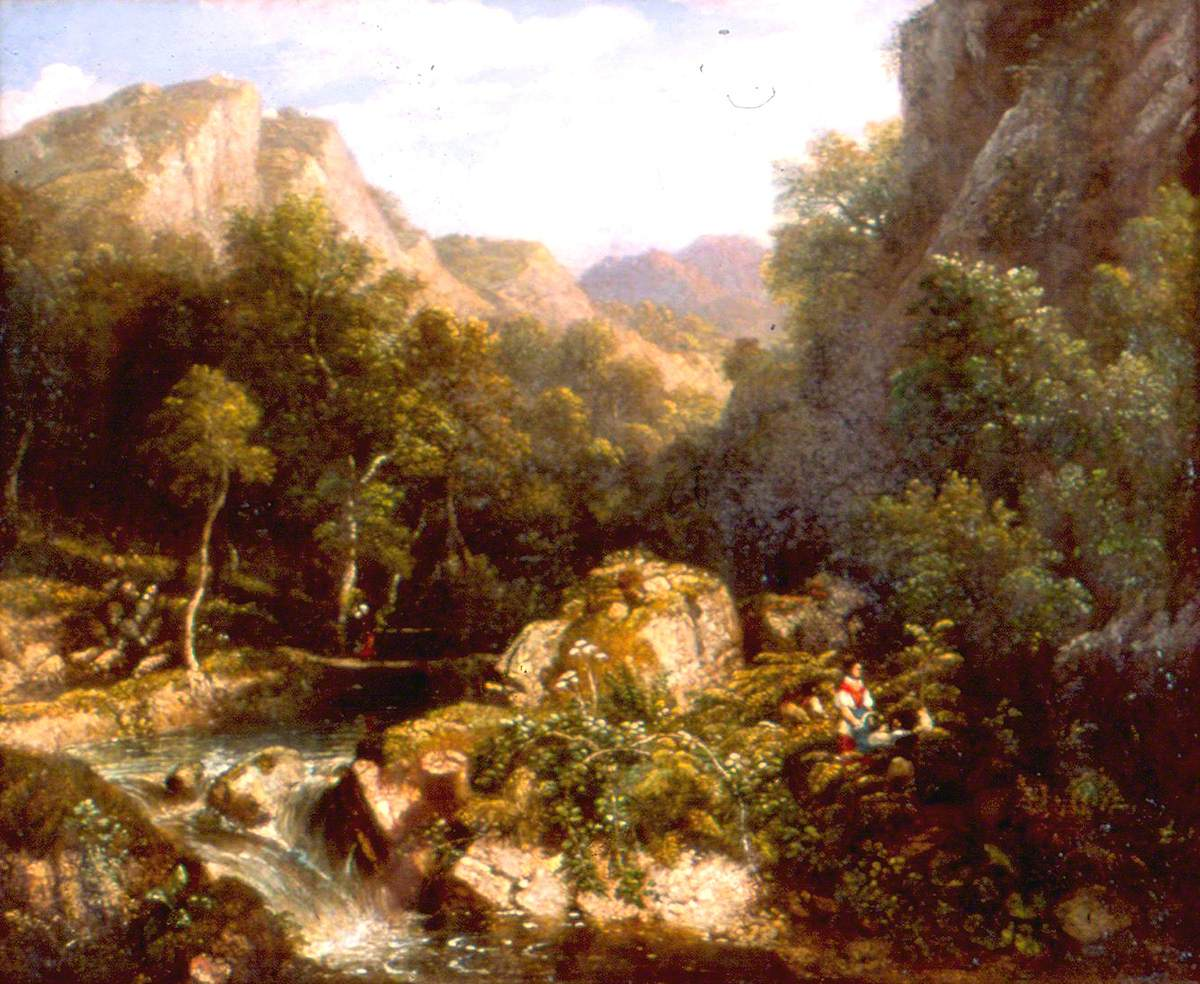
Fern Cutting at Keswick, Cumbria by William Havell

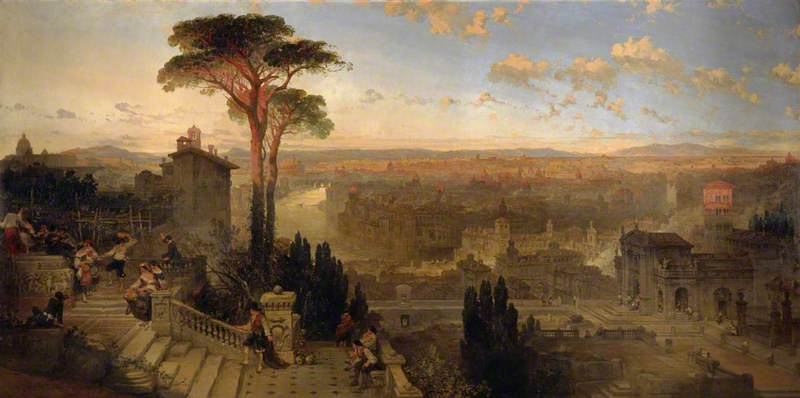
Rome, Sunset from the Convent of Sant' Onofrio on the Janiculum by David Roberts

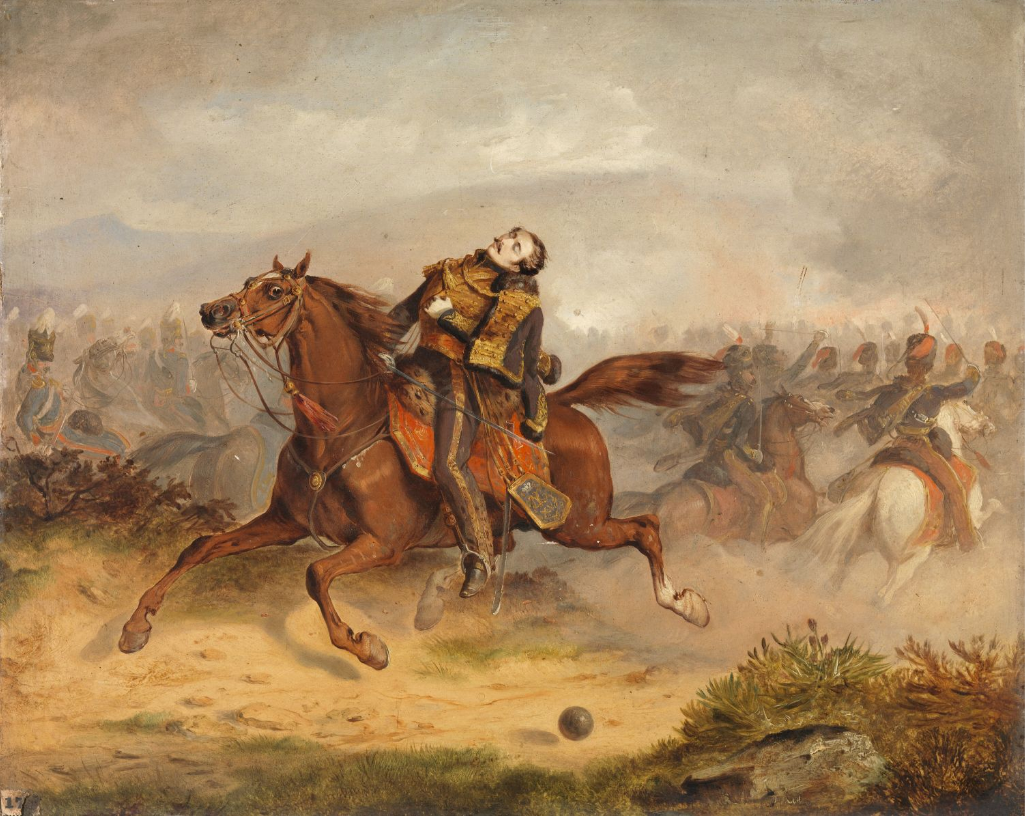
The Charger of Captain Nolan Bearing Back his Dead Master to the British Lines by Thomas Jones Barker

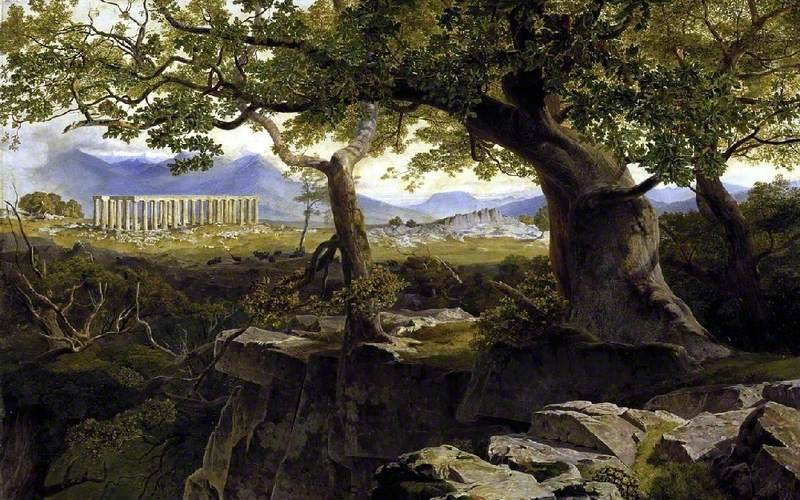
The Temple of Apollo at Bassae by Edward Lear

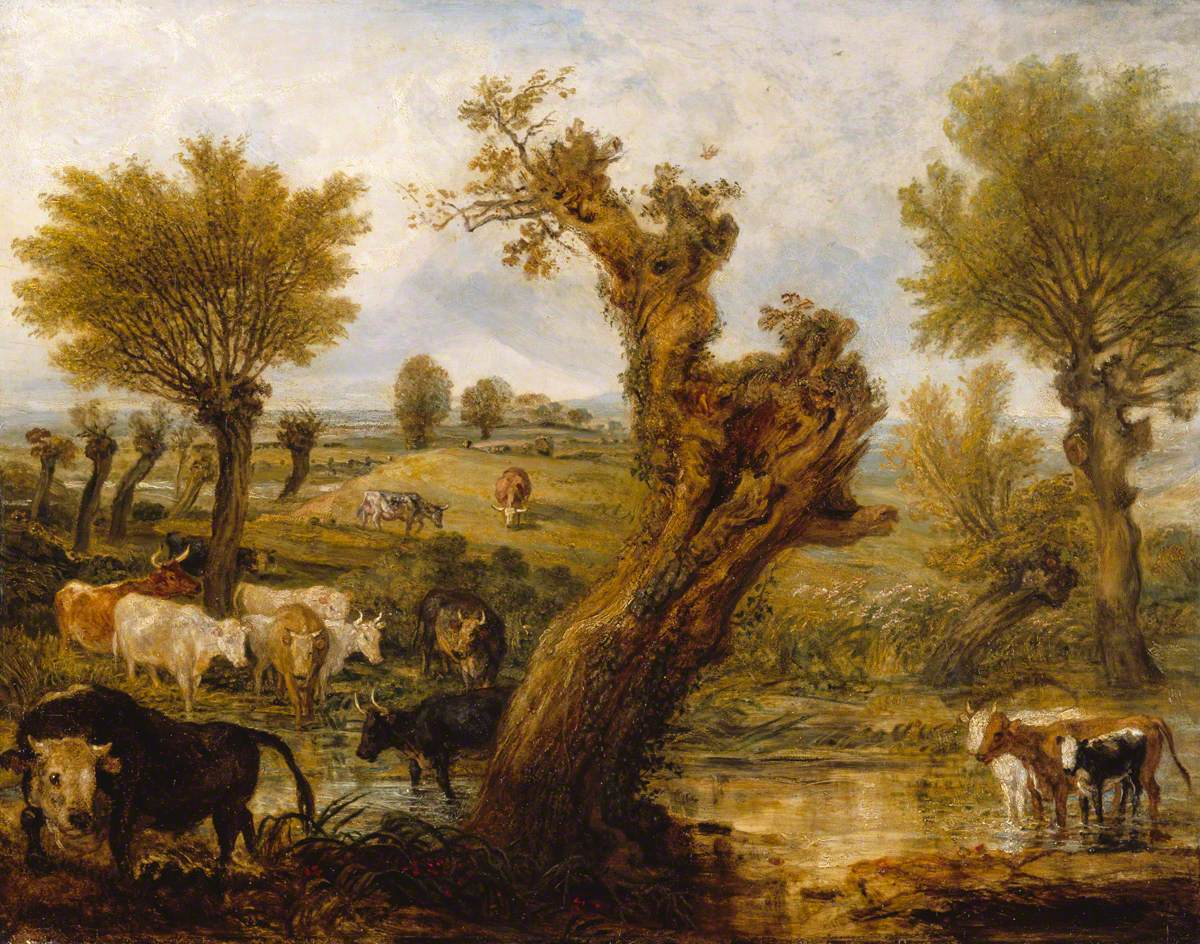
The Morning Grey by James Ward

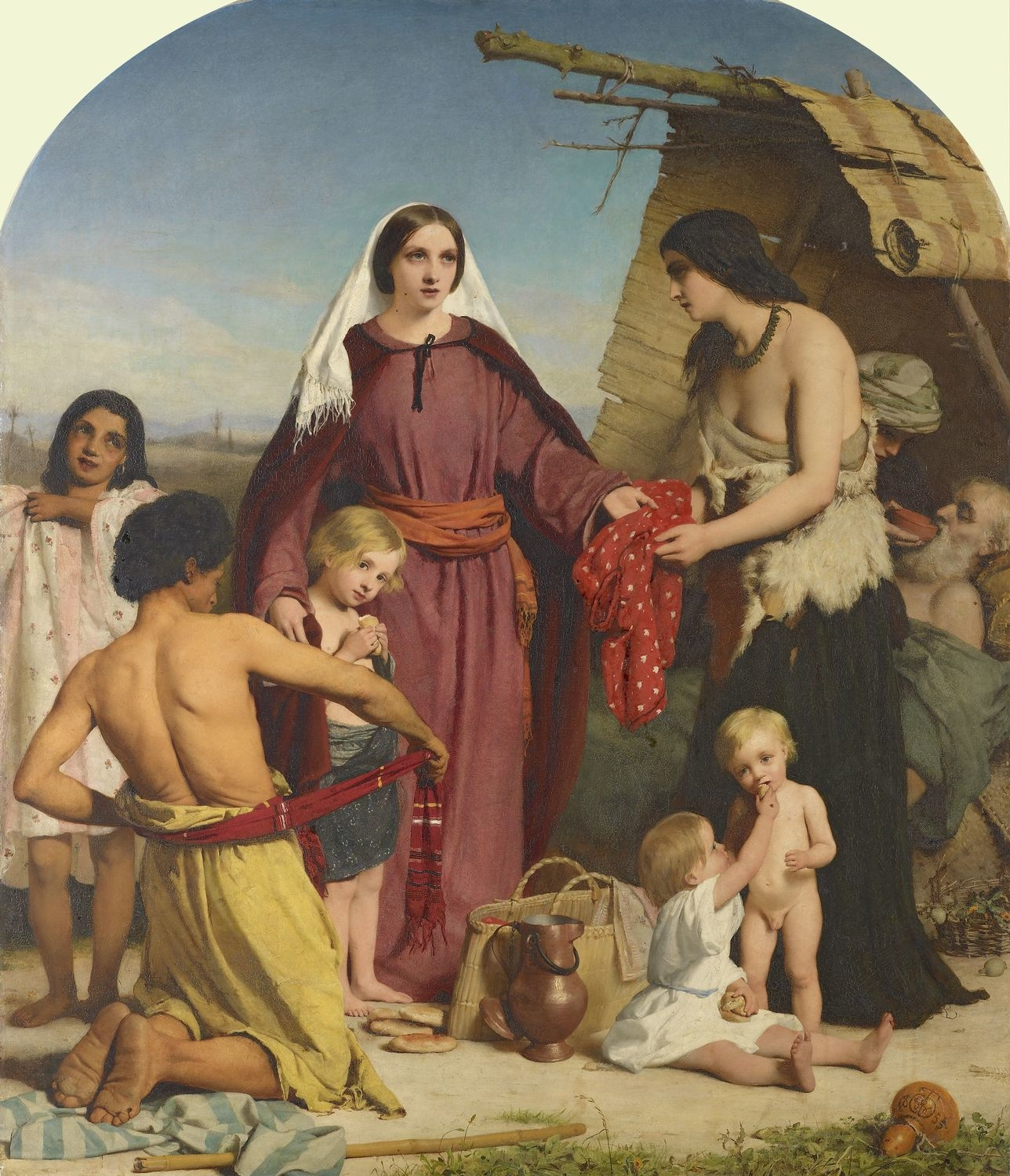
The Almsdeeds of Dorcas by William Charles Thomas Dobson

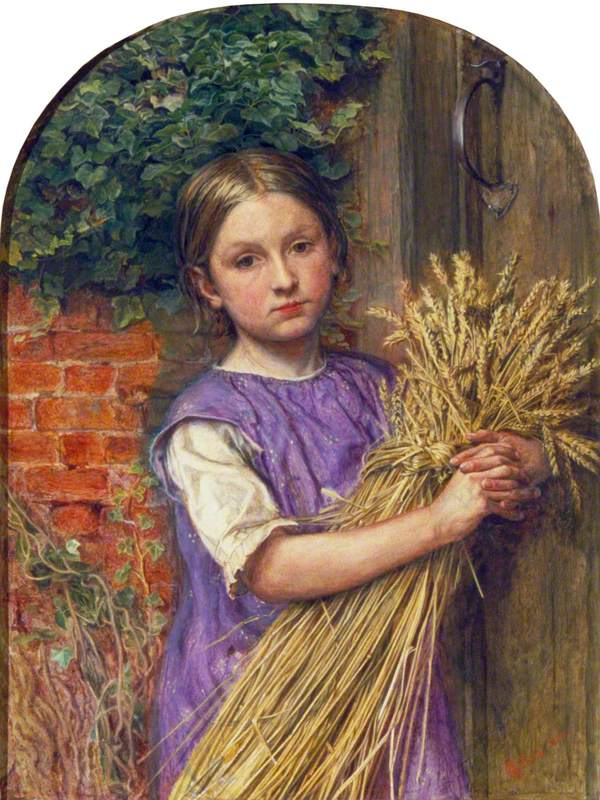
The Good Harvest of 1854 by Charles Allston Collins

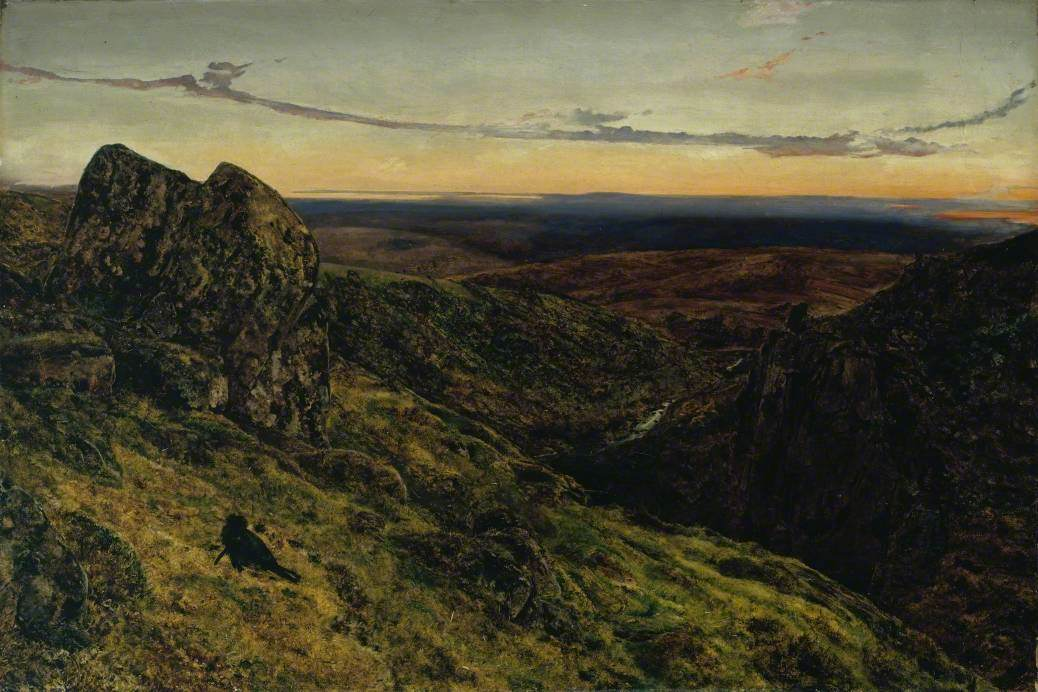
The Moorland by John William Inchbold

Othello and Iago by Solomon Hart

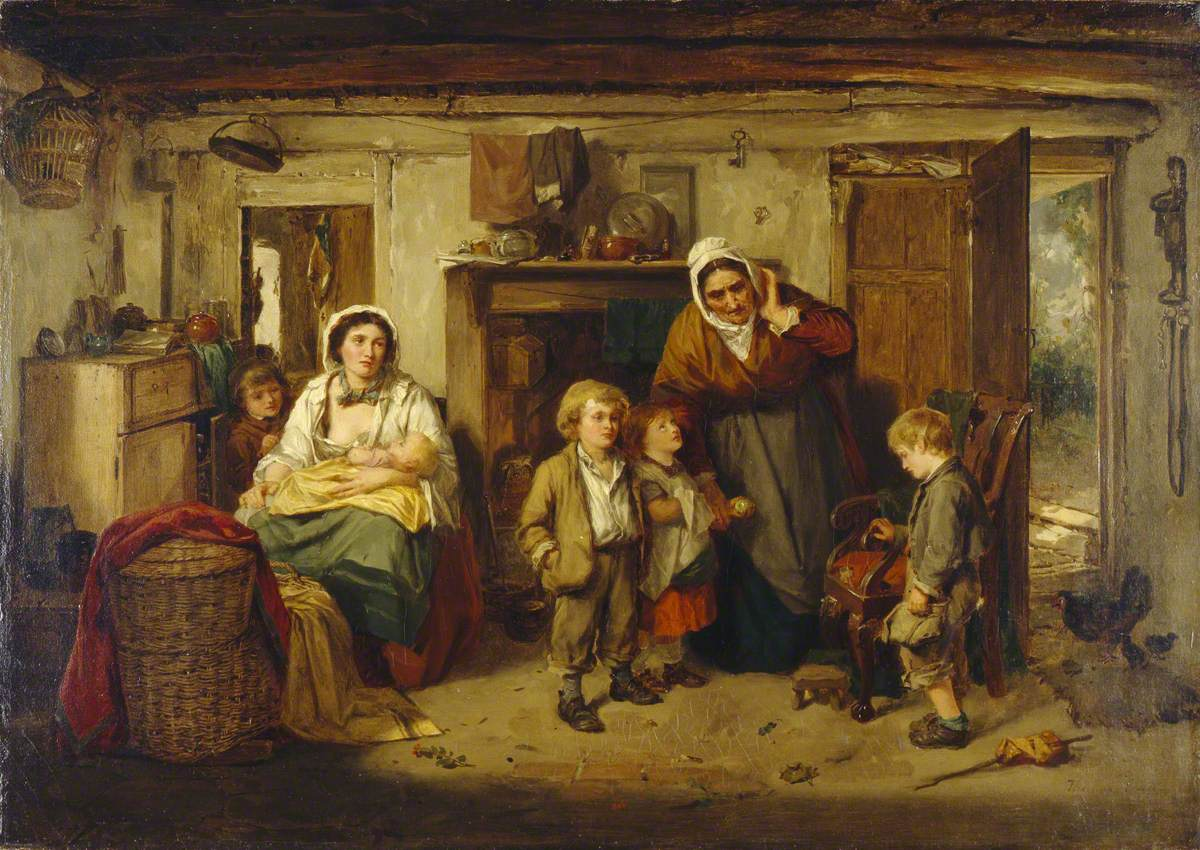
The Mitherless Bairn by Thomas Faed

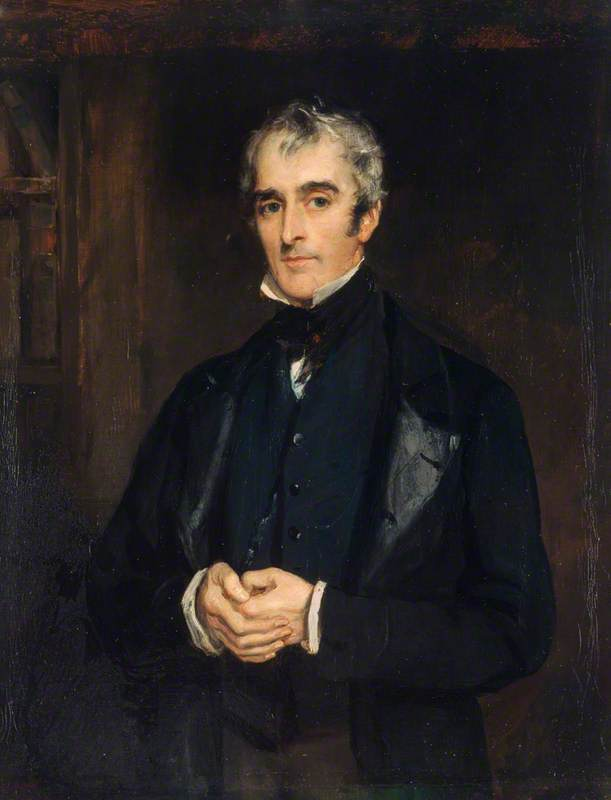
Portrait of John Gibson Lockhart by Francis Grant

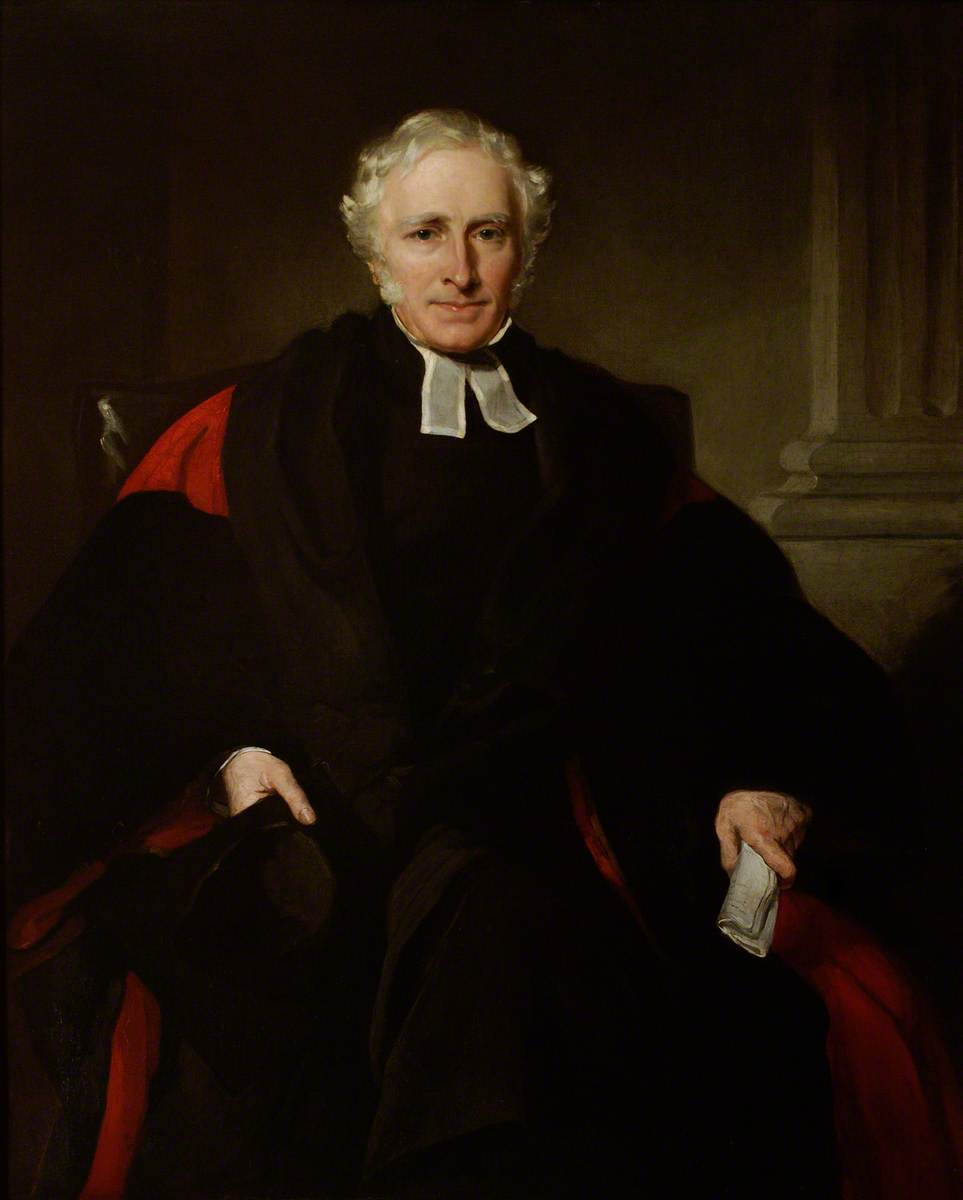
Edward Hawkins by Francis Grant

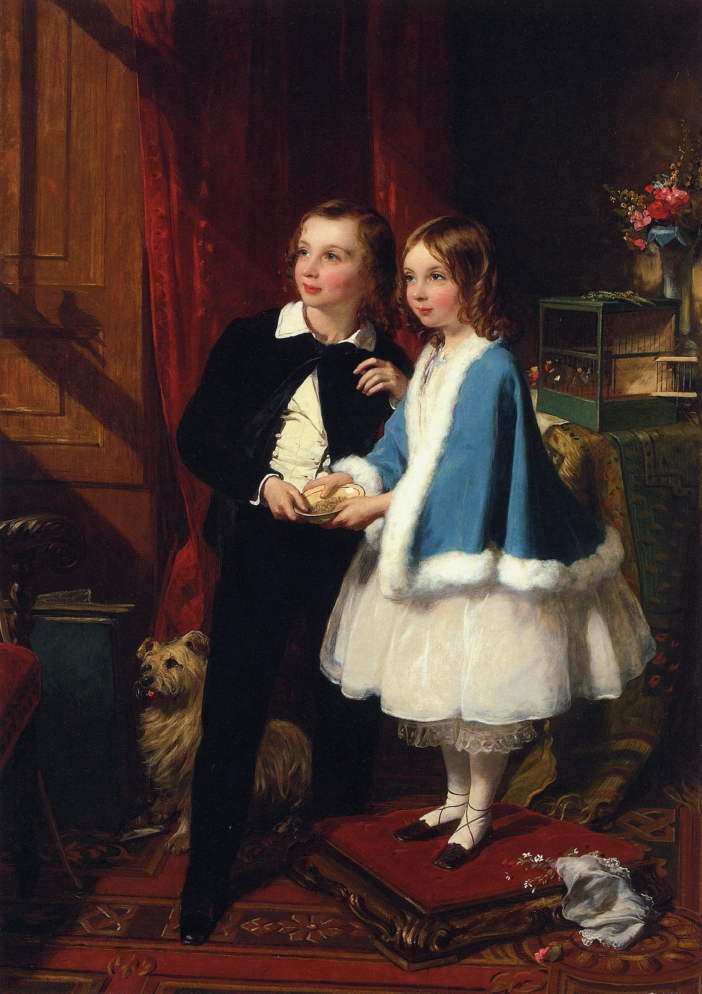
Lord Almeric Athelstan Spencer-Churchill and Lady Clementina Spencer-Churchill by James Sant

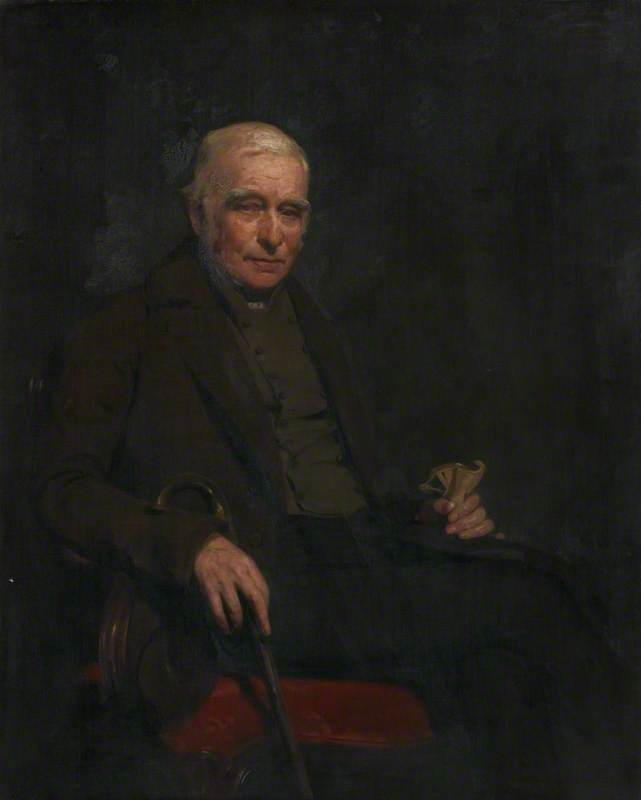
Lord Dunfermline by John Watson Gordon

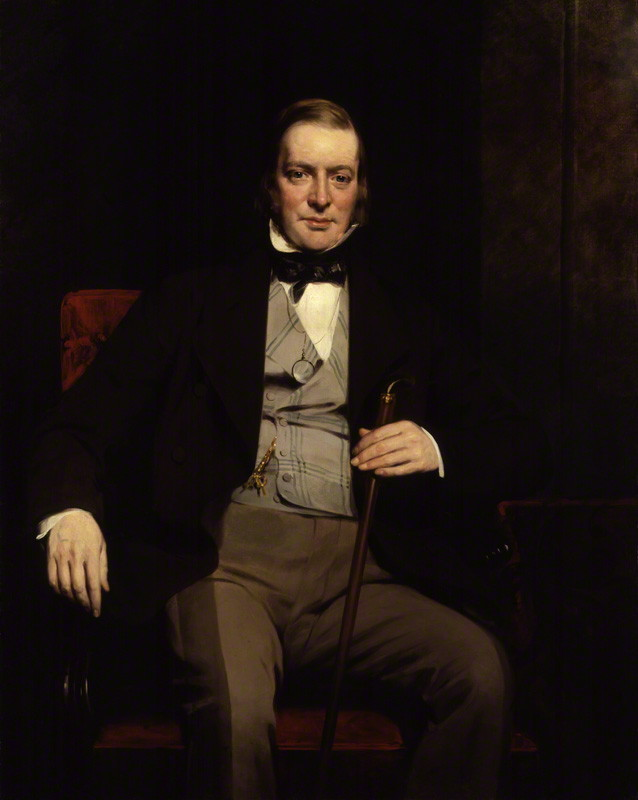
Sir William Molesworth by John Watson Gordon

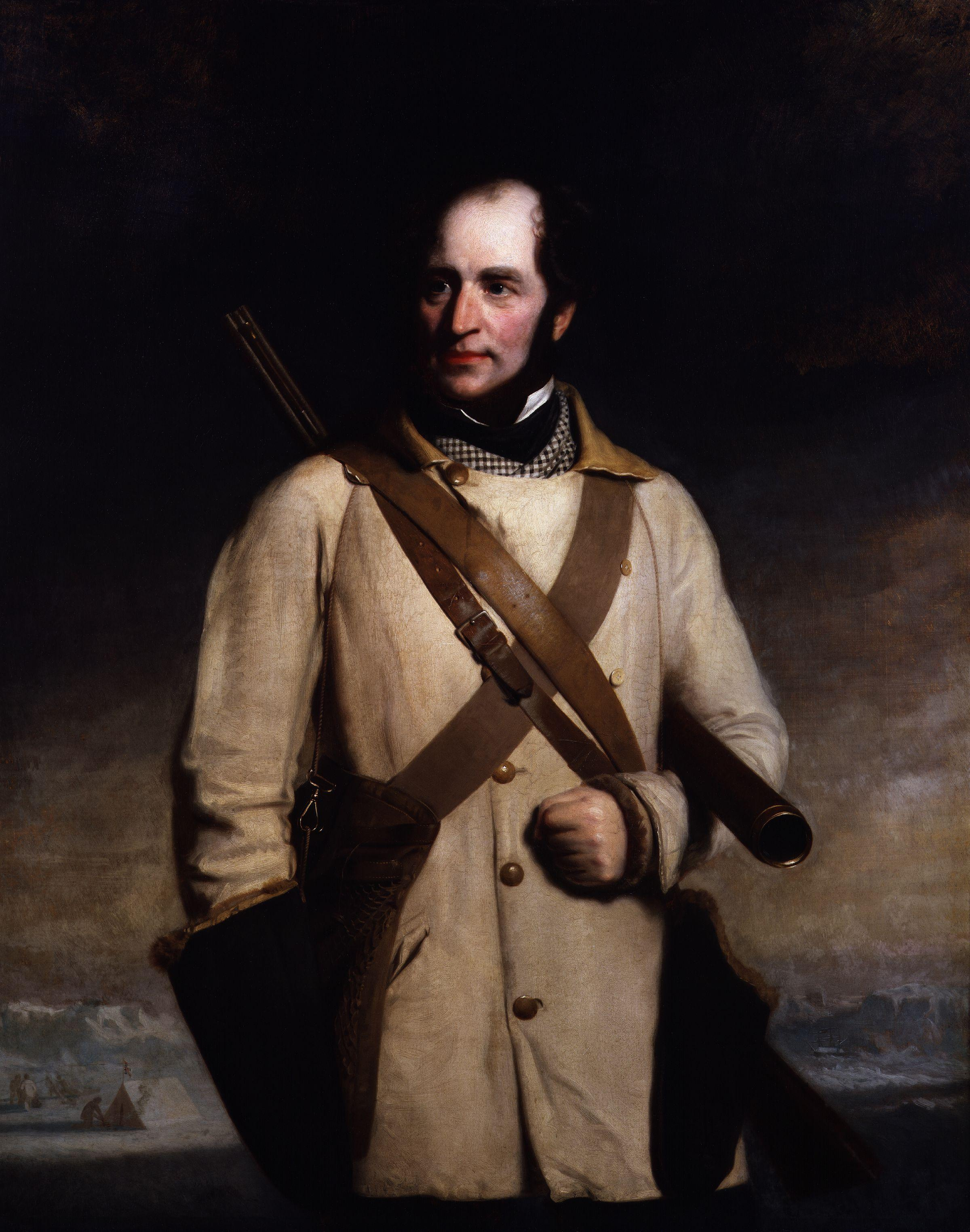
Robert McClure by Stephen Pearce

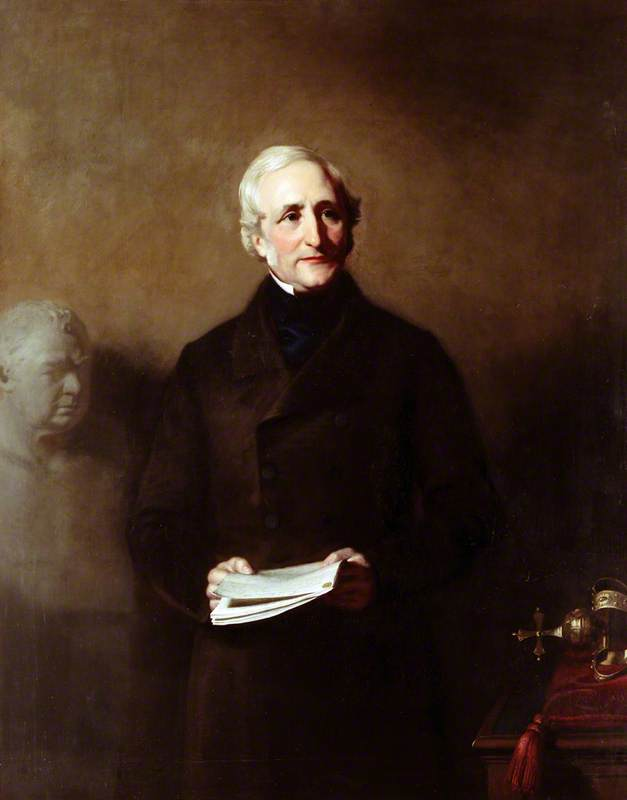
Edward Sabine by Stephen Pearce

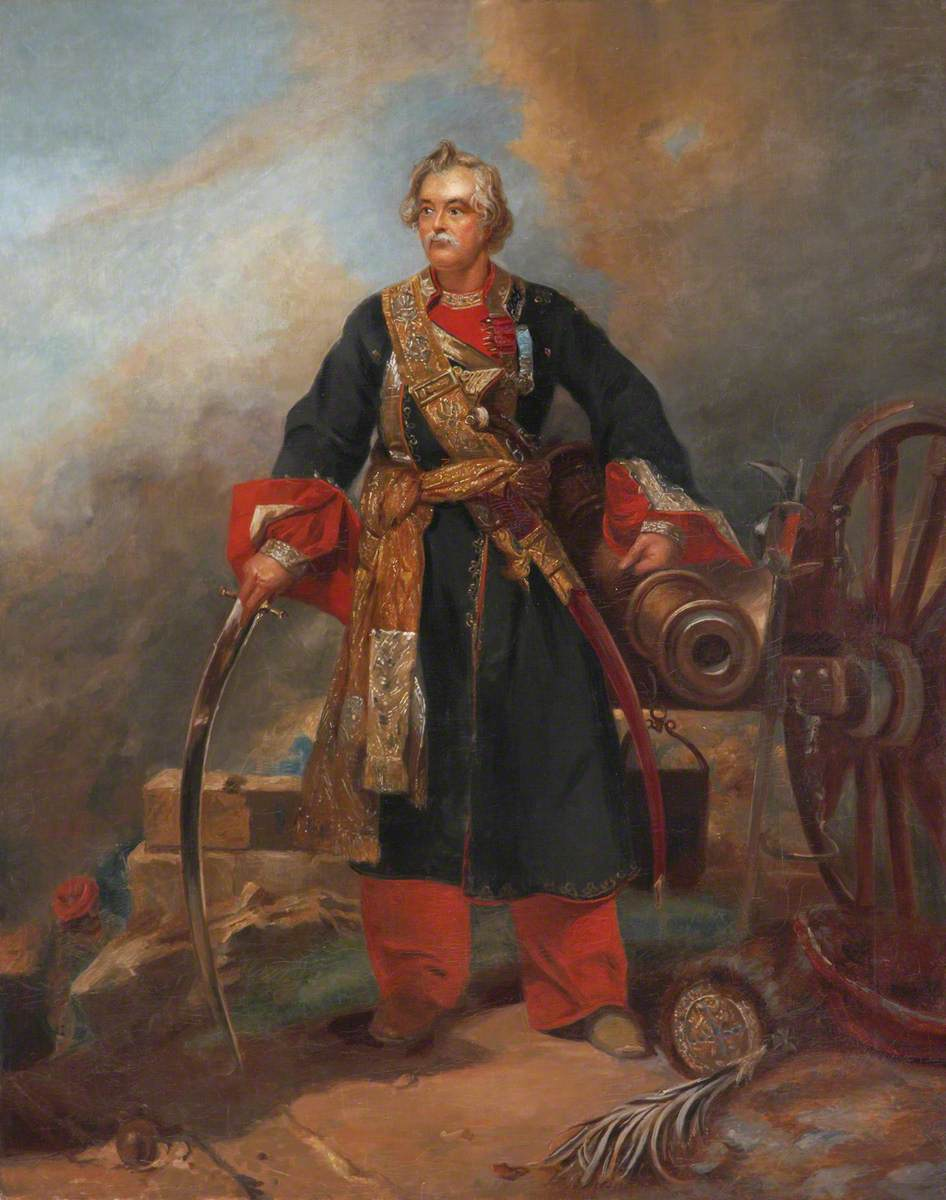
John Bennet Hearsey by Edward Matthew Ward

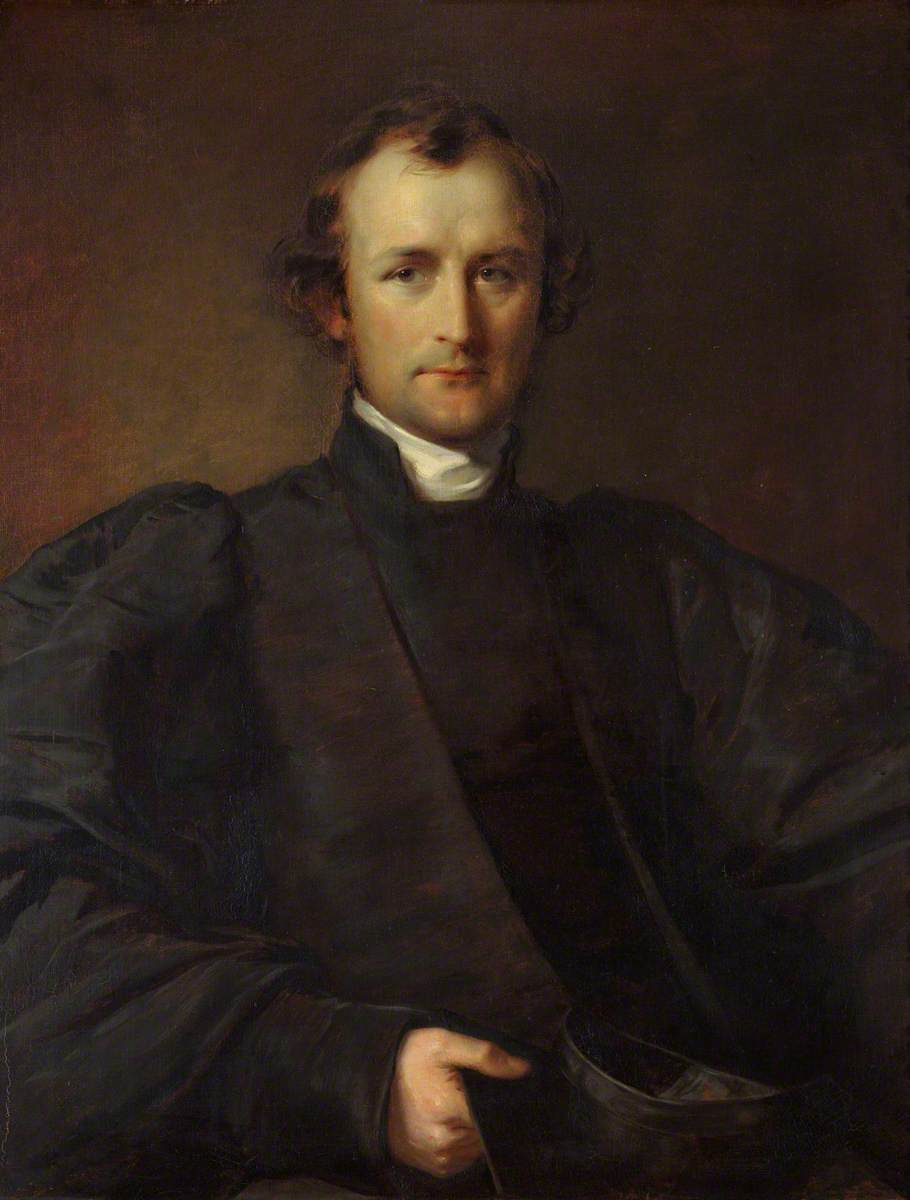
George Selwyn by George Richmond

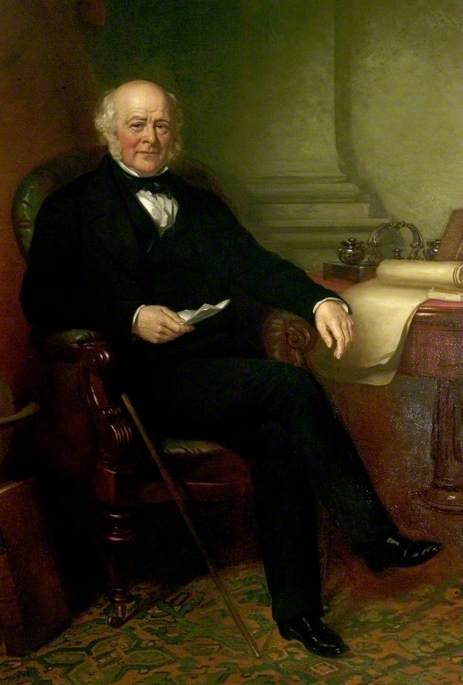
Richard Barrow by John Lucas

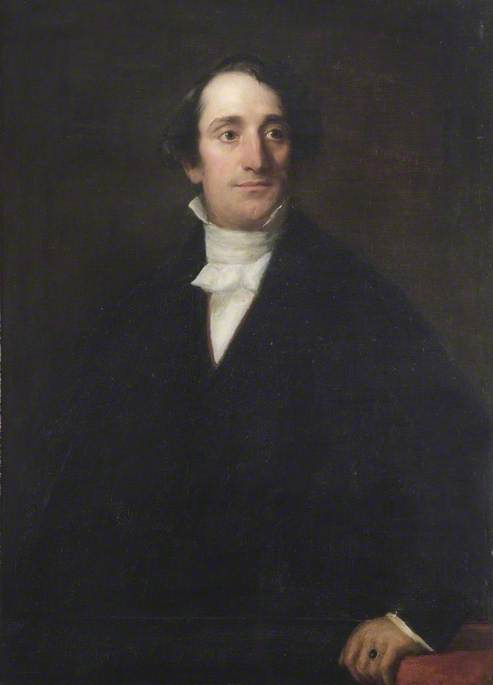
George Leith Roupell by Henry William Pickersgill

Llewelyn Llewellin by Henry William Pickersgill

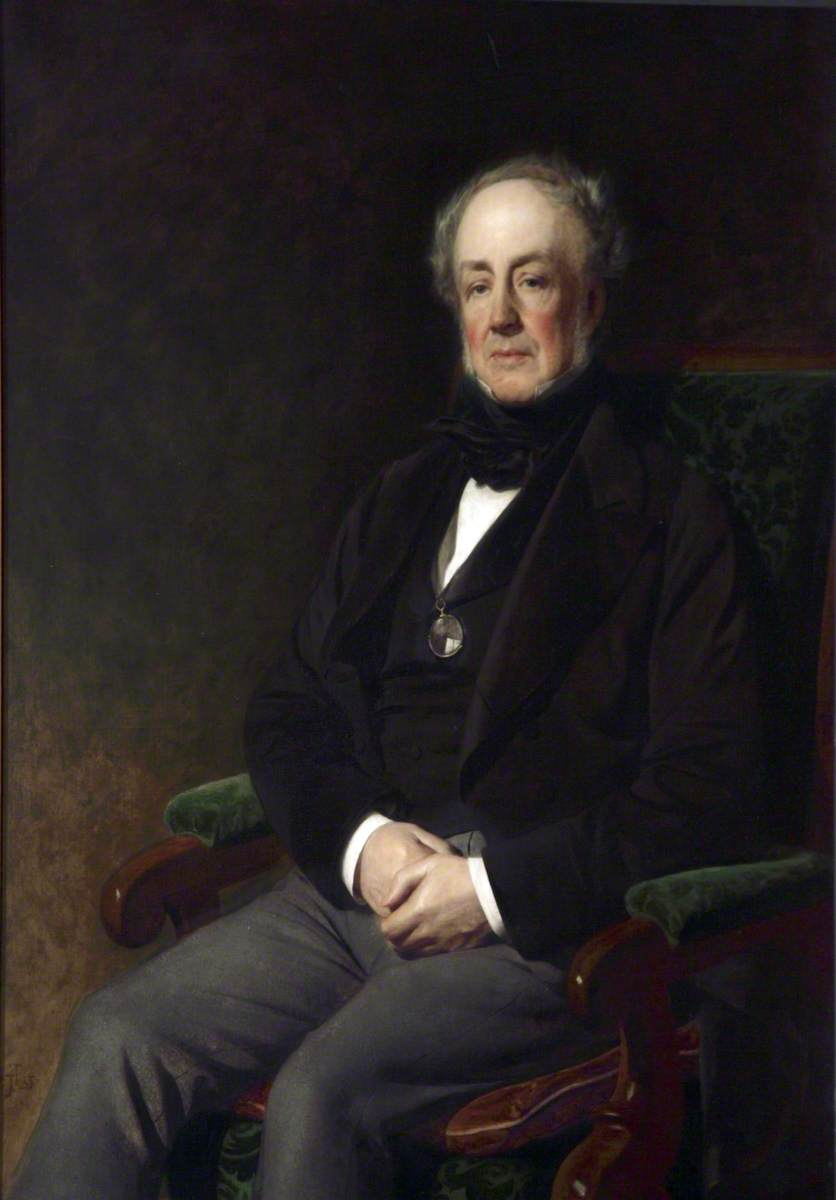
John Bent by John Phillip

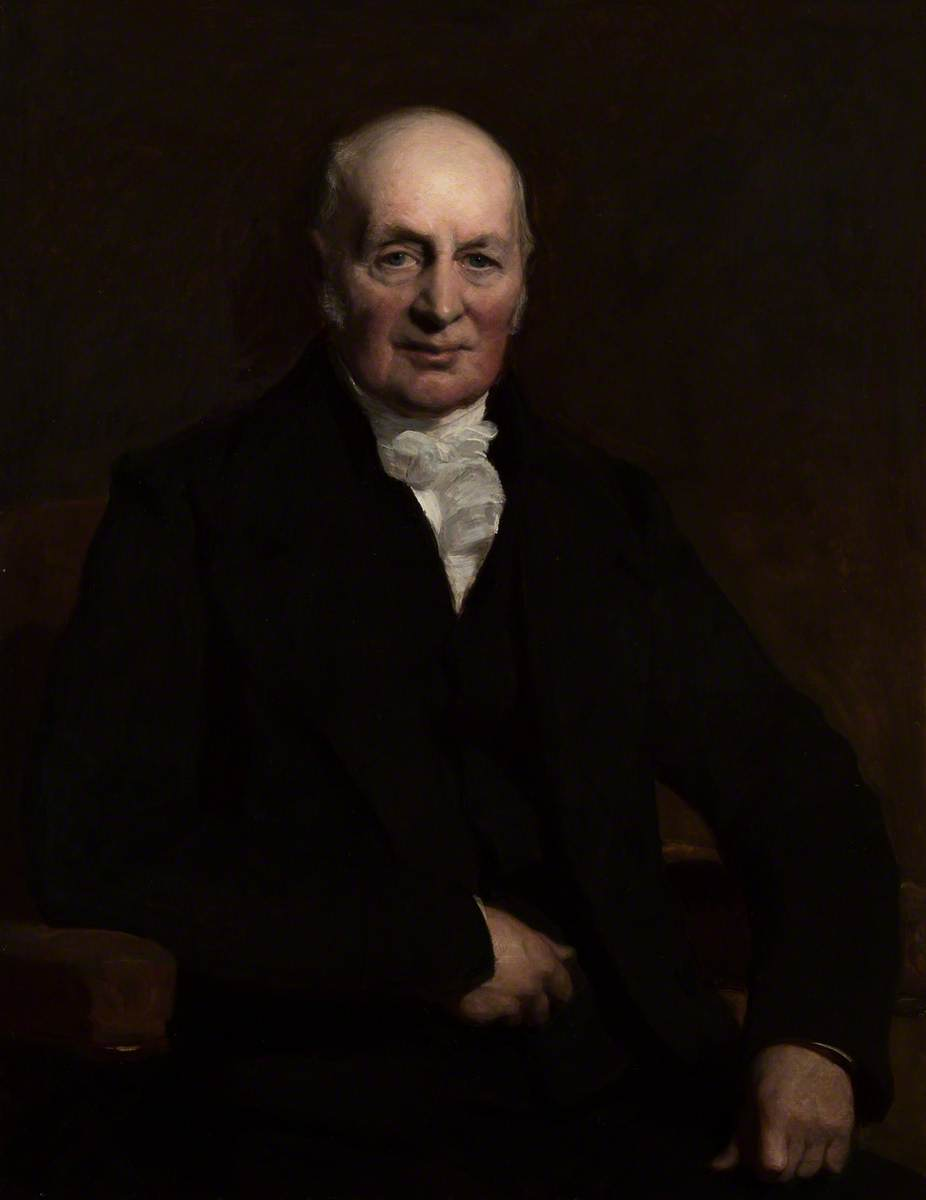
Thomas Carter by John Prescott Knight

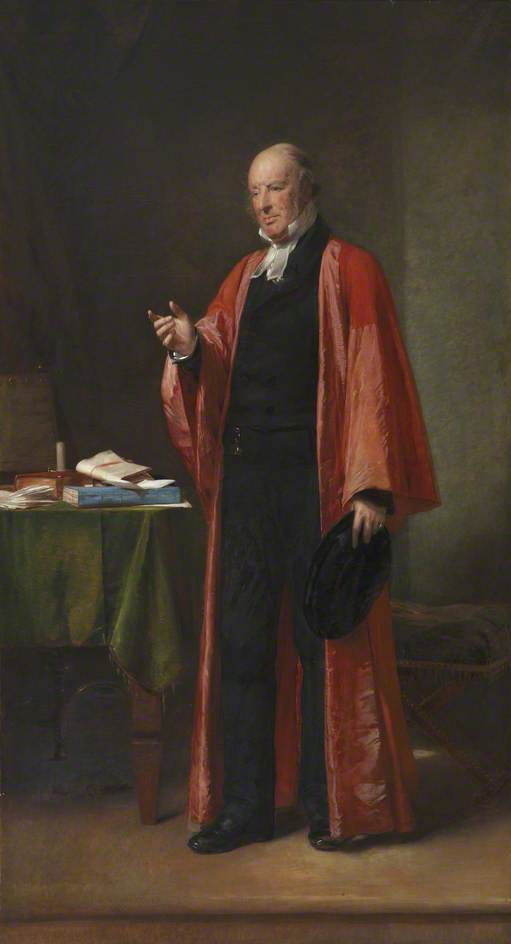
Robert Inglis by George Richmond

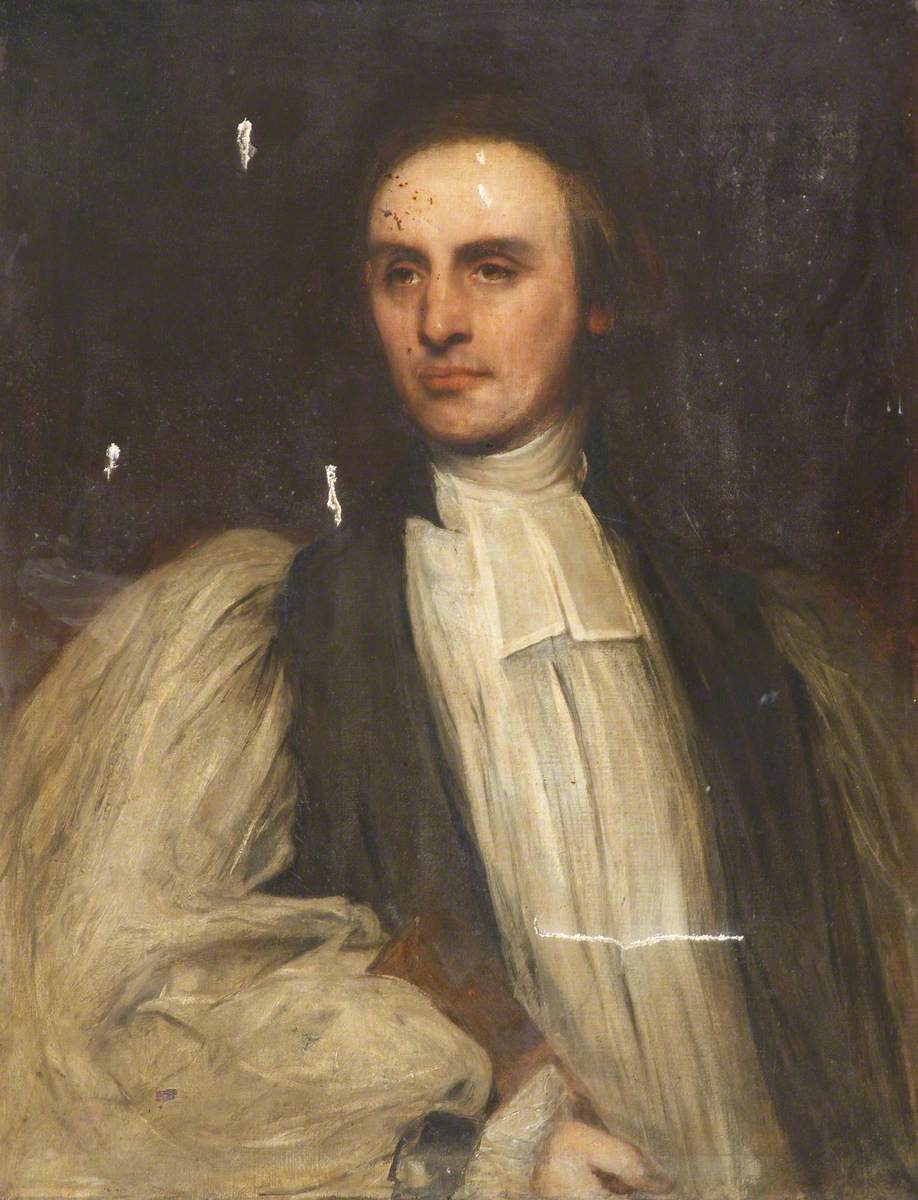
Vincent Ryan by William Boxall

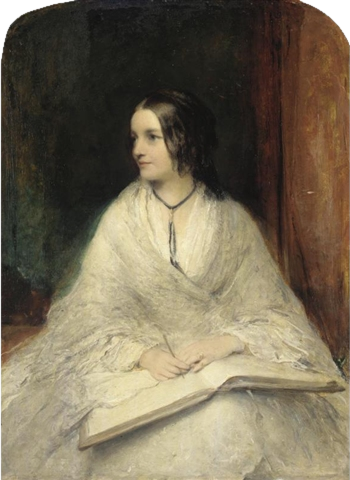
Portrait or Mrs Coleridge by William Boxall

== See also ==
- Salon of 1855, a major art exhibition held in Paris the same year

== Bibliography ==
- Murray, Peter. Daniel Maclise, 1806-1870: Romancing the Past. Crawford Art Gallery, 2009.
- Riding, Christine. John Everett Millais. Harry N. Abrams, 2006.
- Thomas Jane. Victorian Narrative Painting. Harry N. Abrams, 2000.
- Van der Merwe, Pieter & Took, Roger. The Spectacular Career of Clarkson Stanfield. Tyne and Wear County Council Museums, 1979.
