= The Good Harvest of 1854 =

Painting by Charles Allston Collins

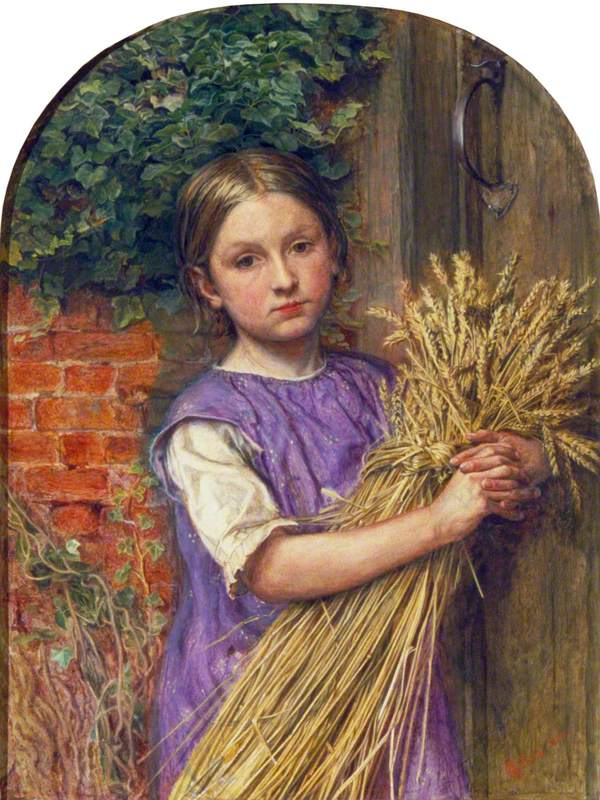
- Artist: Charles Allston Collins
- Year: 1854
- Type: Oil on canvas, genre painting
- Dimensions: 43.8 cm × 34.9 cm (17.2 in × 13.7 in)
- Location: Victoria and Albert Museum, London

The Good Harvest of 1854 is an 1854 oil painting by the British artist Charles Allston Collins. A genre painting, it depicts a girl holding a sheaf of wheat.

The son of the artist William Collins and the younger brother of the novelist Wilkie Collins, Charles was associated with the Pre-Raphaelite movement and this work strongly reflects their style. The critic John Ruskin praised "the careful little painting". It was displayed at the Royal Academy Exhibition of 1855 held at the National Gallery in London. Since 1868 it has been in the collection of the Victoria and Albert Museum in South Kensington.

== Bibliography ==
- Bury, Stephen (ed.) Benezit Dictionary of British Graphic Artists and Illustrators, Volume 1. OUP, 2012
- Casteras, Susan. 'Images of Victorian Womanhood in English Art's. Fairleigh Dickinson University Press, 1987.
- Cooper, Suzanne Fagence. Pre-Raphaelite Art in the Victoria and Albert Museum.Harry N. Abrams, 2003.
