= El Paseo (painting) =

1854 painting by John Phillip

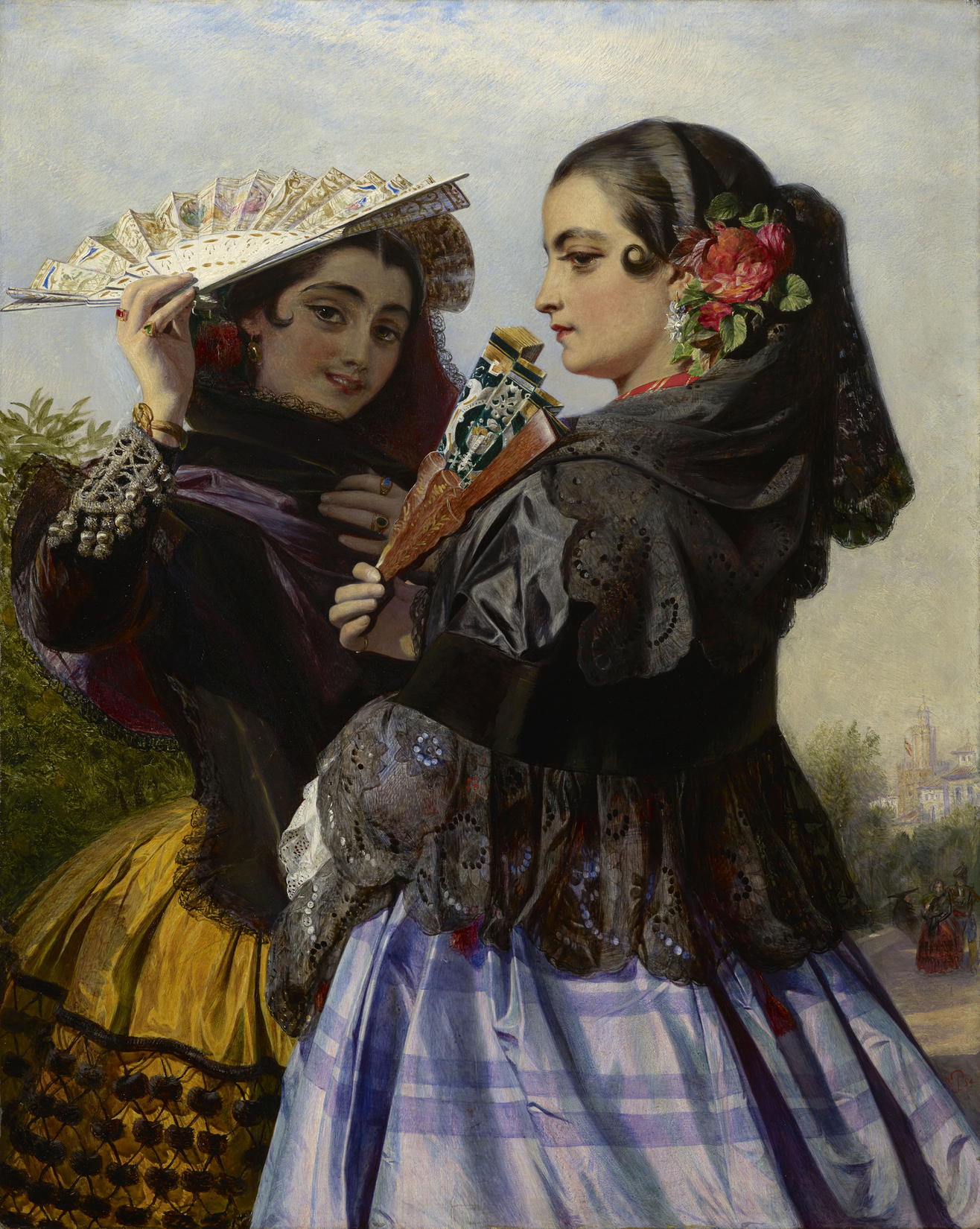
- Artist: John Phillip
- Year: 1854
- Type: Oil on panel, genre painting
- Dimensions: 53.4 cm × 42.6 cm (21.0 in × 16.8 in)
- Location: Royal Collection

El Paseo is an oil on panel genre painting by the British artist John Phillip, from 1854. It is held at the Royal Collection.

== History and description ==
It depicts two young Spanish women with a town in the background. It takes its title "the walk", not from the two woman in the foreground but from a couple strolling in the distance, possibly intended to be their parents. Phillip, a member of The Clique, had become celebrated for his views of Seville.The work was commissioned for 120 guineas by Queen Victoria, an admirer of Phillip's painting, for her husband Prince Albert's birthday. The painting was displayed at the Royal Academy Exhibition of 1855 at the National Gallery in London. In 1878 it was hanging at Windsor Castle. It remains in the Royal Collection.

== Bibliography ==
- Clarke, Deborah & Remington, Vanessa. Scottish Artists 1750-1900: From Caledonia to the Continent. Royal Collection Trust, 2015.
- Marsden, Jonathan. Victoria & Albert: Art & Love. Royal Collection, 2010.
