= 1854 in art =

Events from the year 1854 in art.

== Events ==
- May 1 – The Royal Academy Exhibition of 1854 opens at the National Gallery in London
- July 15 – The marriage of John Ruskin and Effie Gray is annulled.
- November 27 – André-Adolphe-Eugène Disdéri patents a method of producing carte de visite photographs in France.

== Works ==
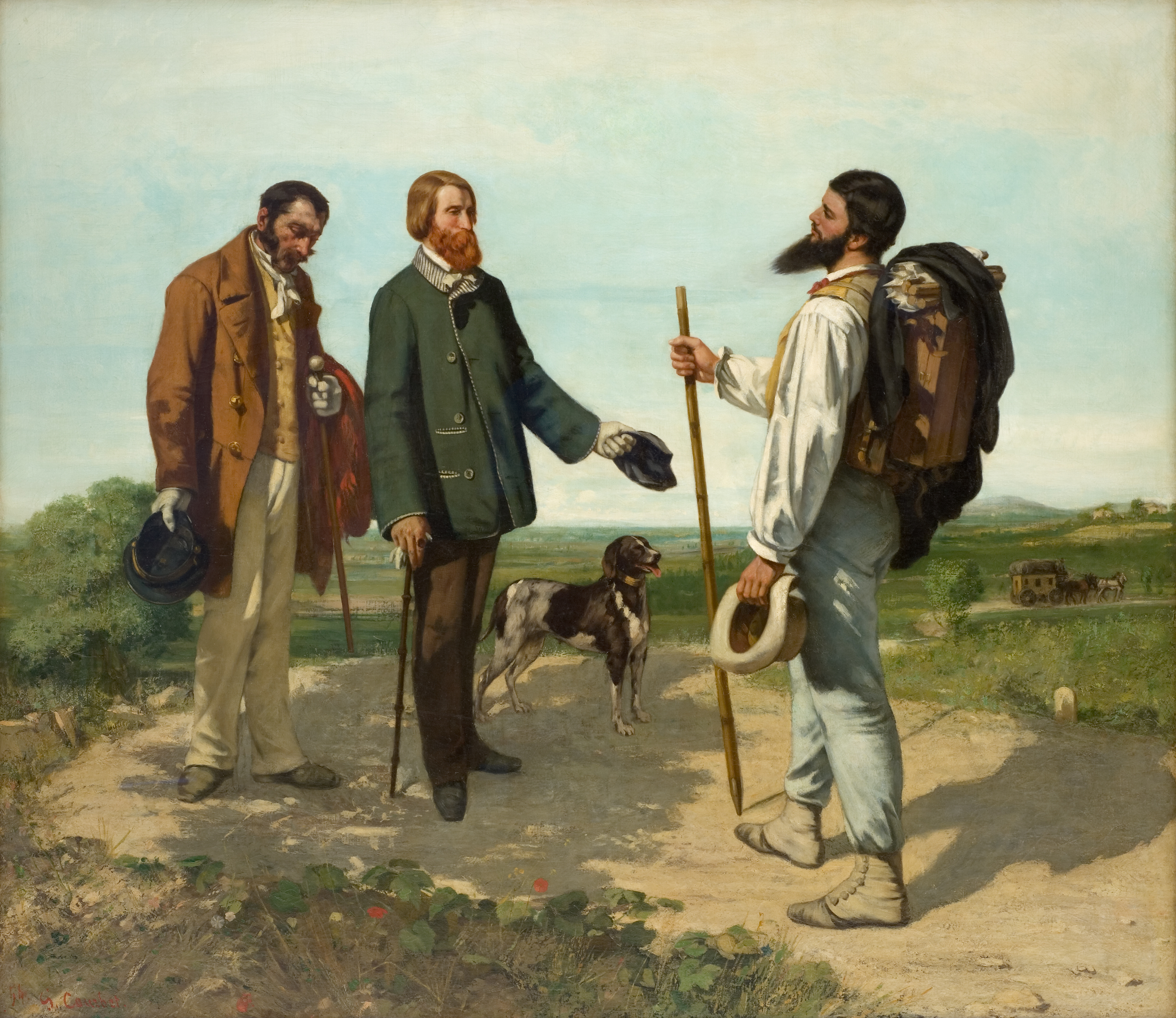
– La rencontre by Gustave Courbet

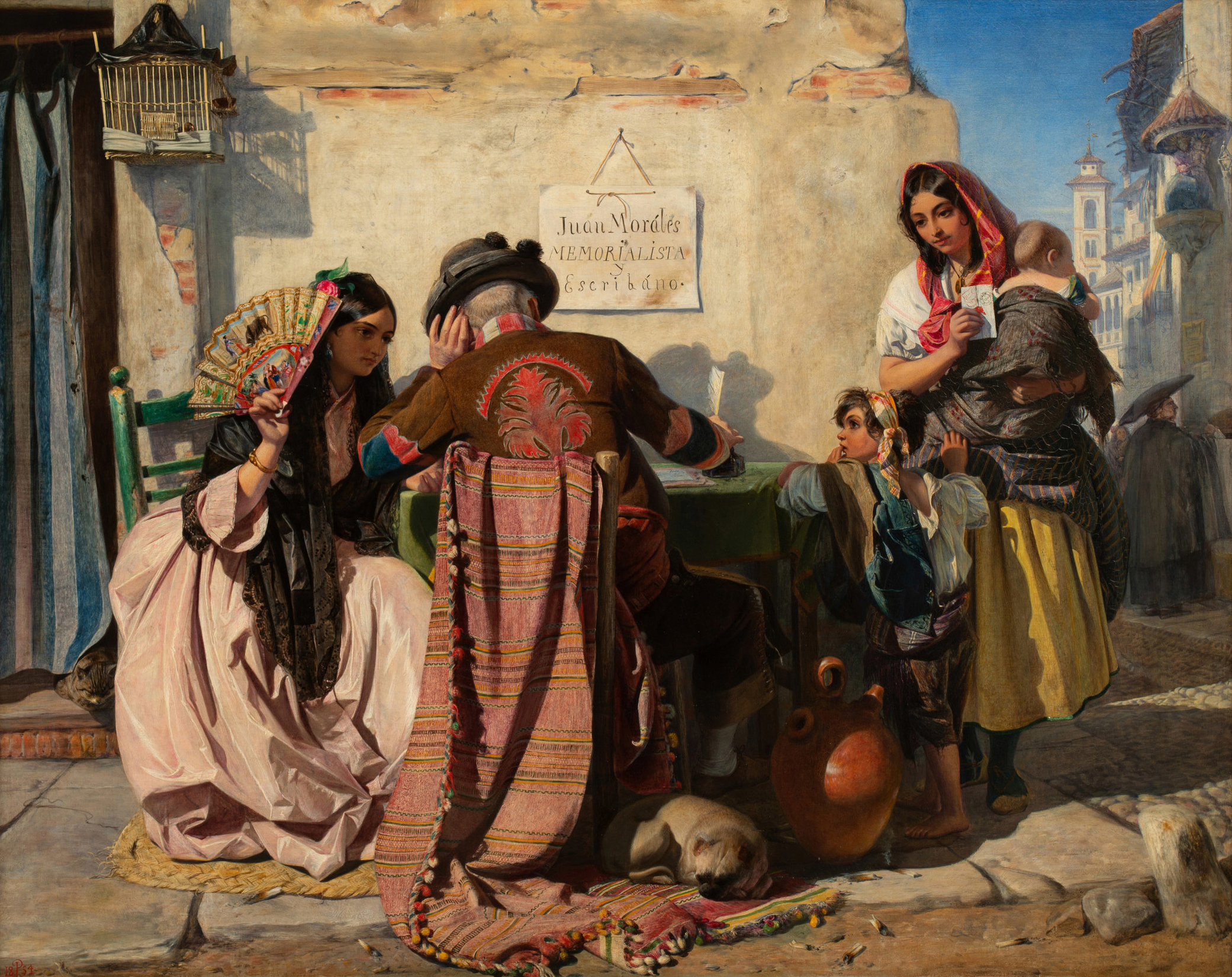
The Letter Writer of Seville by John Phillip

- Gustav Bläser – Athena Protects the Young Hero, Berlin
- Ford Madox Brown – An English Autumn Afternoon
- Charles Allston Collins – The Good Harvest of 1854
- Gustave Courbet
  - La rencontre ("The Meeting" or "Bonjour Monsieur Courbet") (Musée Fabre, Montpellier)
  - The Wheat Sifters
- David Cox – Rhyl Sands
- William Powell Frith – Ramsgate Sands
- Nicolas Gosse – Napoleon III Visiting the Construction Site of the Louvre
- Holman Hunt – The Light of the World
- John William Inchbold – The Moorland
- Charles-Philippe Larivière – Portrait of Marshal Saint-Arnaud
- Daniel Maclise – The Marriage of Aoife and Strongbow
- John Everett Millais – John Ruskin
- Jean-François Millet – The Reaper
- John Phillip
  - El Paseo
  - The Letter Writer of Seville
- Clarkson Stanfield – View of the Pic du Midi d'Ossau in the Pyrenees
- Ferdinand Georg Waldmüller – Vienna Woods Landscape
- Edward Matthew Ward
  - Charles II and Nell Gwyn
  - The Last Sleep of the Earl of Argyll
- George Frederic Watts – Miss Mary Fox, with Spanish Pointer
- Antoine Wiertz – L'Inhumation précipitée
- Franz Xaver Winterhalter – Dalip Singh

== Births ==
- January 1 – Louis Saint-Gaudens, American sculptor (died 1913)
- January 23 – Hans Brandstetter, Austrian sculptor (died 1925)
- February 10 – Giovanni Muzzioli, Italian painter (died 1894)
- March 25 – Alexander Reid, Scottish art dealer (died 1928)
- April 19 – Charles Angrand, French neo-Impressionist painter (died 1926)
- May 21 – John F. Peto, American trompe-l'œil painter (died 1907)
- June 24 – Eleanor Norcross, American painter (died 1923)
- July 21 – Albert Edelfelt, Finnish painter (died 1905)
- August 6 – W. G. Collingwood, English painter and author (died 1932)
- August 12 – Sir Alfred Gilbert, English sculptor (died 1934)
- December 10 – Thomas Cooper Gotch, English painter (died 1931)
- Antonio Fabrés, Catalan painter (died 1938)
- Egisto Massoni, Italian painter (died 1929)
- Francesco Porzio, Italian sculptor (died 1954)

== Deaths ==
- February 2 – Walter Deverell, American-born English Pre-Raphaelite painter (born 1827)
- February 17 – John Martin, English painter and engraver (on the Isle of Man) (born 1789)
- March 13 – Luigi Pichler, German-Italian artist in engraved gems (born 1773)
- May 10 – George Clint, English portrait painter and engraver (born 1770)
- July 30 – Paolo Toschi, Italian draughtsman and engraver (born 1788)
- August 29 – William Brockedon, English painter and inventor (born 1787)
- September 20 – Frederick Catherwood, English artist and architect (born 1799)
- September 23 – Edward Wedlake Brayley, English antiquary and topographer (born 1773)
- September 29 – Jens Peter Møller, Danish painter (born 1783)
- November 24 – Carl Joseph Begas, German historical painter (born 1794)
- December 22 – Bengt Erland Fogelberg, Swedish sculptor (born 1786)
