= Rennie Montague Bere =

British mountaineer and naturalist (1907–1991)

Rennie Montague Bere CMG (28 November 1907 in Bere Regis, Dorset – 23 March 1991 in Plymouth, Devon) was a British mountaineer, naturalist and nature conservationist. In 1928 he became a member of the Alpine Club, London. In 1957 he became a Companion of the Order of St. Michael and St. George.

== Biography ==
Bere was the son of a clergyman. He was educated at Marlborough College and in 1926 entered Selwyn College, Cambridge. In 1930 he joined the British Colonial Service, went to Uganda and worked as District Commissioner and later as Provincial Commissioner for the northern Province. In 1955 he became Director and Chief Ranger of the Uganda National Parks. In 1960 he left Uganda with his wife Anne Maree, whom he had married in Uganda in 1936, and lived in retirement at West Cottage near Bude in Cornwall.

Bere published about a dozen books including The Way to the Mountains of the Moon (1966), Antelopes (1970), The Nature Of Cornwall (1982) and his autobiography A Cuckoo's Parting Cry: a personal account of life and work in Uganda between 1930 and 1960 (1990).

== Climbing and mountain exploration ==
In 1935, when on leave from Africa, Bere and David Cox made the first ascent of Climbers Club Ordinary on the Dewerstone in Devon, a climb which is featured in the compendium Classic Rock and was the first recorded route on the Dewerstone, a cliff which "offers the finest climbs" on Dartmoor.

During his thirty years in Uganda he accomplished many feats of mountaineering and added to knowledge of the mountains particularly of the Ruwenzori range. Bere researched many inselbergs, the Imatong range on the Sudanese border and the Virunga volcano.

== Selected works ==
- The Wild Mammals of Uganda and Neighbouring Regions of East Africa, 1961
- The Way to the Mountains of the Moon, 1966
- Wild Animals in an African National Park, 1966
- The African Elephant, 1966 (German translation: Die Welt der Tiere: Der Afrikanische Elefant, translated by Odo Walther, 1976)
- Birds in an African National Park, 1969
- Antelopes (German translation: Die Welt der Tiere: Antilopen, translated by Theodor Haltenorth), 1970
- Wildlife in Cornwall: a naturalist’s view of the southwestern peninsula, 1970
- Crocodile’s Eggs for Supper, and other Animal Tales from Northern Uganda, 1973
- Mammals of East and Central Africa, 1975
- The Story of Bude Haven, 1977
- The Book of Bude and Stratton, 1980
- The Nature of Cornwall: the wildlife and ecology of the county, 1982
- A Cuckoo’s Parting Cry: a personal account of life and work in Uganda between 1930 and 1960, 1990

== Sources ==
- A. D. M. Cox: "In Memoriam Rennie Montague Bere", in: Alpine Journal; 1992, pp. 325–326
- Geoff Milburn: "Obituary Rennie Montague Bere", in: The Climbers Club Journal; 1991 Volume XXI No. 1 (New Series), pp. 148–151
- Ernest Kay: The International Authors and Writers Who's Who, International Biographical Centre, 1989 ISBN 978-0-900332-88-3; p. 65
