= Massoni =

Massoni is an Italian surname. Notable people with the surname include:

- Carlos Domingos Massoni (1939-2026), Brazilian basketball player
- Egisto Massoni (1854–1929), Italian painter
- Leonardo Massoni (born 1987), Italian footballer
- Norberto Massoni (1935–2010), Argentine politician
- Philippe Massoni (1936–2015), French politician

== See also ==
- Masoni (disambiguation)
