= David Cox (historian and mountaineer) =

English historian and mountaineer

- Born: 8 June 1913; Plymouth, England
- Died: 25 October 1994 (aged 81); Cyprus
- Education: Hertford College, Oxford
- Occupations: Historian, rock climber and mountaineer
- Known for: First ascent of Machapuchare, vice-master of University College, Oxford
- Children: 3 daughters

Anthony David Machell Cox (8 June 1913 – 25 October 1994) was a historian and mountaineer.

David Cox was born in Plymouth, and he spent his teenage years in Yelverton, Devon, where his father was headmaster of a prep school. Cox attended Clifton College, Bristol. In 1932 he went on to study Greats and modern history at Hertford College, Oxford.

== Academic life ==
Cox spent most of his adult life at Oxford University. He was elected as a Fellow of All Souls (1937), before becoming a Fellow and Praelector in Modern History at University College (1939–1980). Apart from war service, for the rest of his working life he remained a fellow of University College, where he held a number of roles, including being senior tutor for almost 30 years and vice-master for a period in the late 1970s until his retirement in 1980.

His academic expertise was in medieval history, ranging from medieval domestic and parish records, the history of University College, Oxford and its early members, through to crusader castles and the orders of chivalry.

== Climbing in the UK and Europe ==
Cox was not only a mountaineer, modern commentary on several of his first ascents shows that he was also a highly proficient technical rock climber who played a significant part in new developments. As a boy, before he went to university in 1932, Cox was climbing on the tors of Dartmoor in Devon. The 1976 climbing guidebook to Dartmoor credits him with the first ascent of "most of the routes on Sheeps Tor", he climbed those between 1930 and 1935.

While an undergraduate he became President of the Oxford University Mountaineering Club and he and Robin Hodgkin "were central in a bright pre-war flowering of the Oxford University Mountaineering Club". Together they were involved in numerous significant first ascents, many in the upper grades of difficulty for the period. These included, in 1936, the climb Climbers Club Direct on the Dewerstone in Devon, which is now regarded as '3 star' classic and has been described as "one of the technical masterpieces of its time, as hard, perhaps, as any pitch yet done in Britain" and "one of the hardest routes in the country at the time, and not repeated for a decade". In 1935 Cox, with Rennie Bere, made the first ascent of Climbers Club Ordinary on the same cliff; this route is featured in the compendium Classic Rock and was the first recorded climb on the Dewerstone, a cliff which "offers the finest climbs" on Dartmoor.

During a week spent camping beneath Clogwyn Du'r Arddu in 1937, Cox and Hodgkin, along with Clare and Berridge Mallory (the daughters of George Mallory the Everest pioneer), repeated most of the existing routes on the cliff and made significant variations on several of the existing climbs as well as making a major first ascent (of Sunset Crack). He visited the cliff on several other occasions, perhaps the most significant of those being in October 1945, when he and Jock Campbell made the first ascent of the climb Sheaf (HVS **), which has been described as "a superb discovery" and "a masterpiece of route finding".

Cox also co-authored a climbing guide book for Craig yr Ysfa in North Wales. While carrying out preparatory work for the guide book he made a number of first ascents on the crag, including several when he was climbing alone and unroped. One of those, his solo first ascent of Spiral Route on Craig yr Ysfa in 1938 has been described as "a solo effort which ranks with the great achievements on Welsh rock" and "one of the outstanding achievements of the pre-war era".

He made his first visit to the Alps in 1933, returning on several occasions during the 1930s. The war years marked a break but for about 10 years, around the 1950s, Cox was Wilfrid Noyce's regular climbing partner and from 1949 through to 1958 they spent several seasons climbing together in the Alps.

== War years ==
In 1942, after two years service with the Royal Artillery, he was seconded to the Commando Mountain and Snow Warfare Centre in Braemar, where he and John Hunt trained troops under Frank Smythe. In 1943 Cox was promoted to the rank of Major and became 'Chief Instructor, Rock' to the Middle East Ski and Mountaineering School at the Cedars of Lebanon above Beirut.

By 1945 he was Commanding Officer of a Mountain Commando Training Wing in Llanberis. In autumn 1945 Chris Preston, who was a mountain instructor under Cox's command, attempted to make the first ascent of the climb now known as Suicide Wall on the flank of Idwal Slabs (Rhiwiau Caws), in Wales. Cox had insisted that Preston carry out an abseil inspection, when he made the actual attempt he reached the half way ledge but his climbing partners were unable to follow, a safe retreat was impossible and Cox provided a rope from above so that Preston could safely escape. The following weekend Preston returned and accomplished the first ascent; in an attempt to minimise his responsibility if Preston had fallen and been fatally injured, Cox absented himself by going to climb at Clogwyn Du'r Arddu instead. Suicide Wall was regarded as "a leap forward in wall-climbing – the hardest climb in Britain for over a decade".

== Himalayan climbing ==
In 1957 Cox joined Noyce on a Himalayan expedition when they were part of a team, led by Lieutenant Colonel Jimmy Roberts, attempting the first ascent of Machapuchare in Nepal (6,993 m (22,943 ft)). The party also included Roger Chorley and Charles Wylie. Cox and Noyce successfully climbed to within 150 ft (46 m) of the summit via the north ridge (an approximate altitude of 22,793 ft (6,947 m)).

Although they stopped their ascent a short way below the summit, the Nepali government have not given any other parties permission to climb the mountain since the Roberts expedition.

Before leaving Nepal, Cox and Noyce went on to make the first ascent of Singu Chuli (also known as Fluted Peak) (6,501 m (21,329 ft)). They climbed the north-east face, finishing by the top section of the east ridge, and reached the summit on 13 June 1957.

In the early stages of the Machapuchare expedition Roger Chorley contracted polio and was evacuated.

== Later life ==
In 1958, the year after the Machapuchare expedition, Cox, Noyce and Anthony Rawlinson were climbing in the Alps when Cox himself contracted polio. It was thought unlikely that he would walk again but he managed to recover enough to return to hiking up hills in the UK although permanently weakened arms and chest meant that he was never again able to do any serious climbing.

Cox was elected as President of the Alpine Club (1971–1973); in that role he has been credited for preparing the ground "in the face of many die-hards" for the amalgamation of the Ladies Alpine Club with the (then) male only Alpine Club.

He died on 25 October 1994 on the last day of a holiday in Cyprus.
