= The Happy Lovers =

Painting by Gustave Courbet

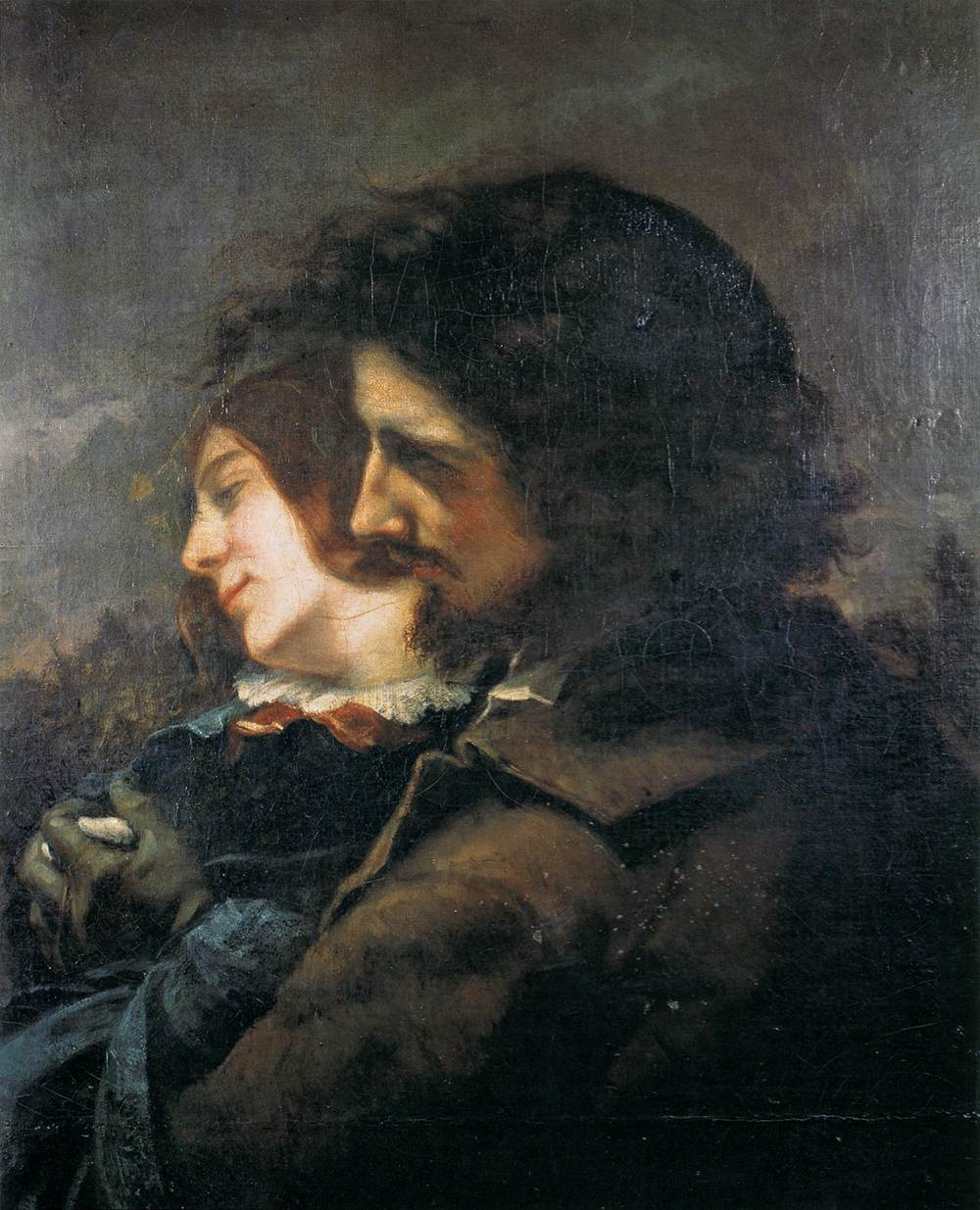
- Artist: Gustave Courbet
- Year: c. 1844
- Medium: oil on canvas
- Dimensions: 77.5 cm × 60 cm (30.5 in × 24 in)
- Location: Musée des Beaux-Arts de Lyon

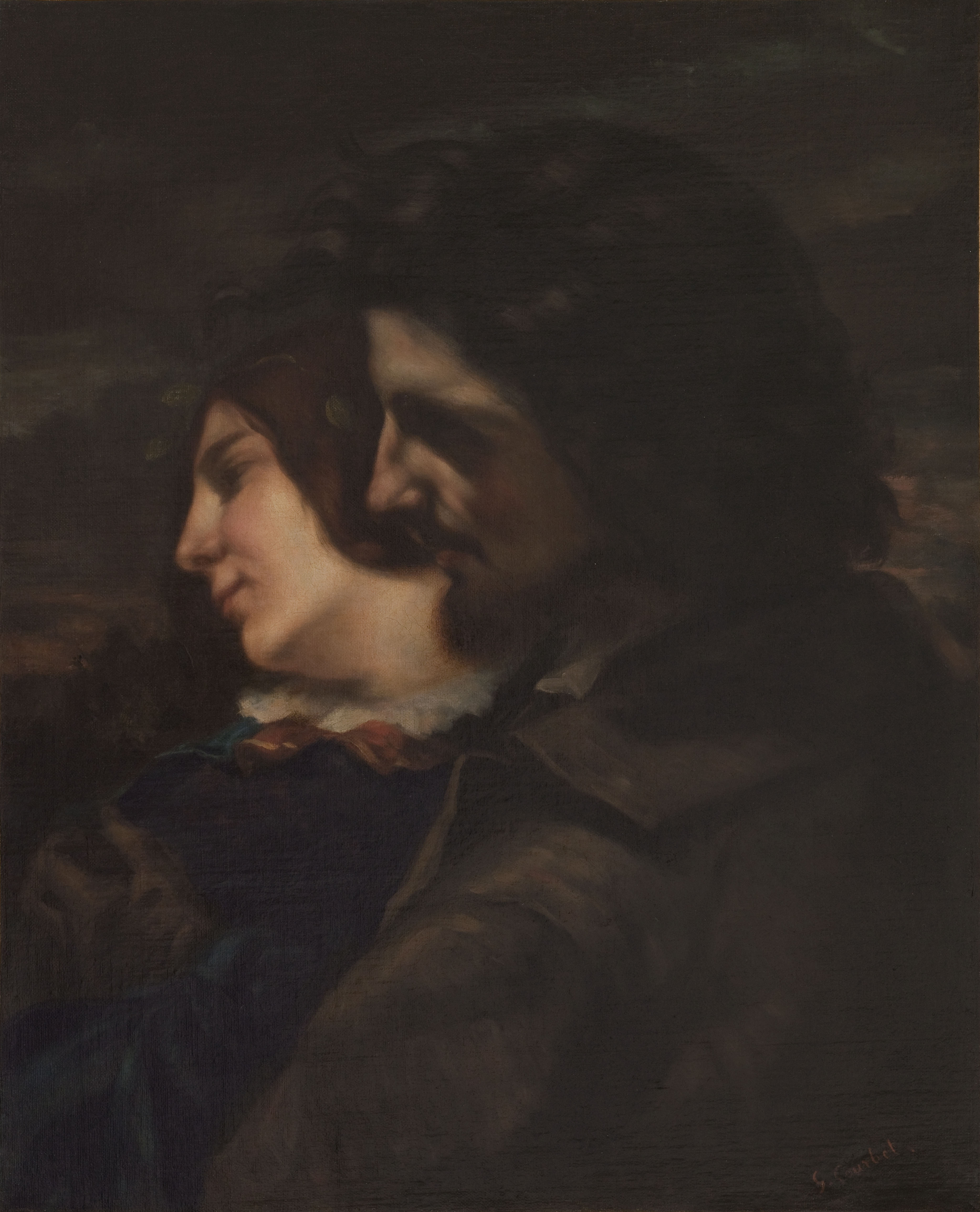
Petit Palais version

The Happy Lovers is a title given to a c. 1844 painting by the French artist Gustave Courbet, now in the musée des Beaux-Arts de Lyon. One of its earlier titles when exhibited in 1855 at the Pavillon Courbet in Paris was The Waltz. It was sold in the Courbet sale of 1881 and bought by M. Hard and resold to M. Brame, before entering the collection of the musée des Beaux-Arts de Lyon in 1892. The engraver Félix Bracquemond, a friend of the painter, reproduced the work as an etching.

This was the prototype for a second version produced around the same time, under the title The Lovers in the Countryside – Sentiments of youth, which was given to the Petit Palais in Paris in 1909 by Juliette Courbet. Both are oil paintings on canvas and show the artist and a woman in profile.

== Analysis ==
The painting has been described as an evocation of two lovers leaning against each other in the whirlwind of a waltz. The female model may be Virginie Binet, the mother of the artist's son, born shortly after the creation of this painting and visible in The Wheat Sifters (1854). Several preparatory drawings for the painting are known.

The use of radiography has made it possible to determine with certainty that the Lyon version of The Happy Lovers preceded the version preserved in Paris: the study of the first reveals that the original format was square, but that Courbet added a lower band 10 cm wide; moreover, pentimenti are apparent, the woman's hand was leaning on the man's shoulder and the setting was a bay and not a landscape. The Paris version, a repetition of this motif but of a smaller size, does not reveal any pentimenti on analysis.
