= The Early Career of Murillo =

Painting by John Phillip

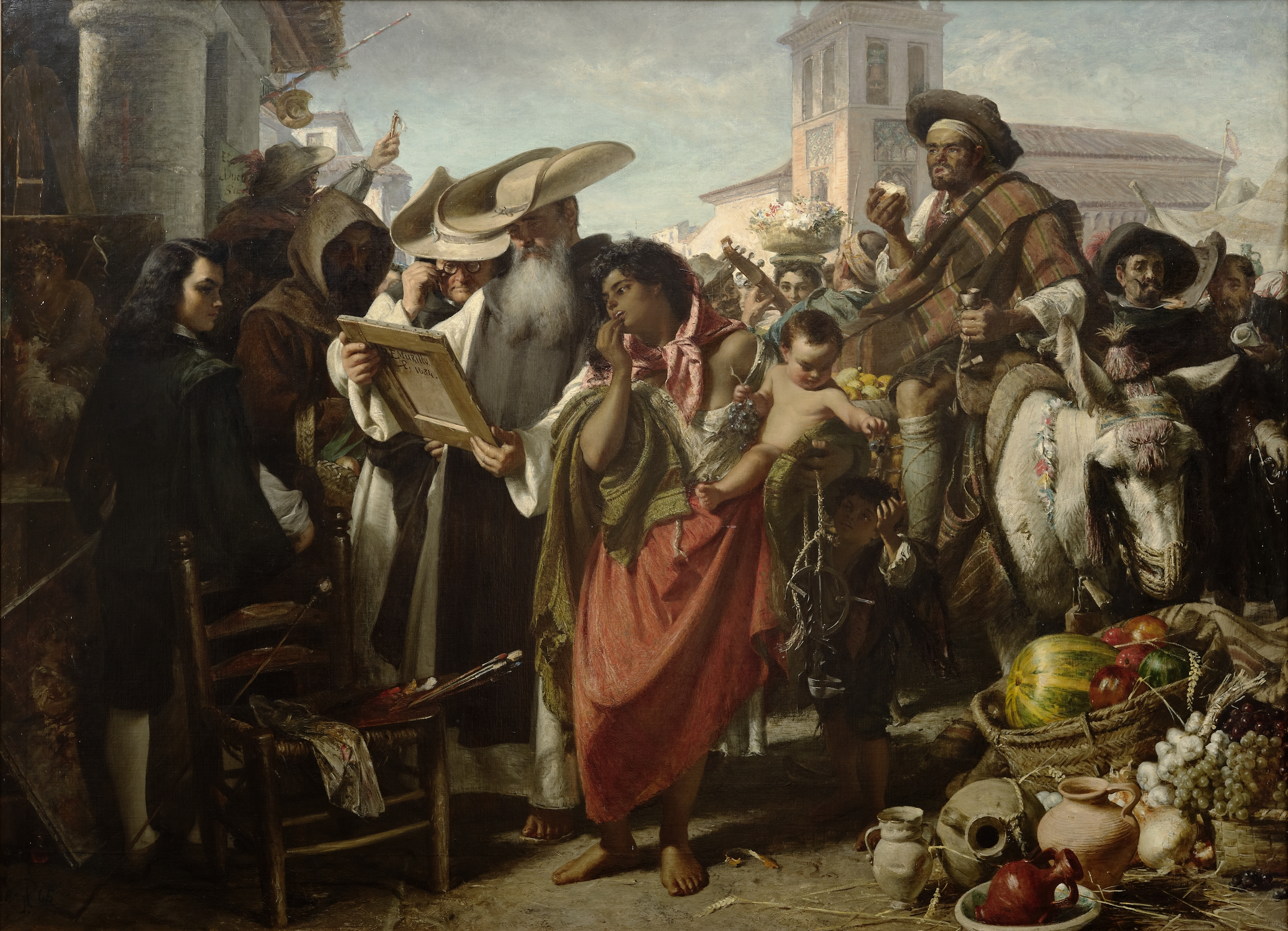
- Artist: John Phillip
- Year: 1865
- Type: Oil on canvas, history painting
- Dimensions: 181 cm × 250.2 cm (71 in × 98.5 in)
- Location: Private collection

The Early Career of Murillo, 1634 is an oil on canvas history painting by the British artist John Phillip, from 1865. It is held in a private collection.

== History and description ==
It depicts a scene from the life of the Spanish 17th-century painter Bartolomé Esteban Murillo. The young Murillo, at the left, in the shadow, scraped a living by selling pictures at the weekly fair held at the Alameda de Hércules, in Seville. The scene attracts several people, specially from the upper classes, but also seems to interest commoners. Three monks seem to be very interested by one of his paintings, possibly of religious matter. A barefoot woman, of dark complexion, possibly of mixed race or a gypsy, with her baby, also seems to have taken interest on it. A man riding a donkey can be seen at the right, eating and drinking. At the bottom right, some pottery and fruits seem to create a sill-life. The background shows the belfry of the church of All Saints. The painting seems to draw inspiration from Murillo's own genre scenes. Phillip was inspired by a passage in William Stirling-Maxwell's 1847 book Annals of the Artists of Spain for this depiction.

The Aberdeen-born Phillip began his career as a member of The Clique, producing genre scenes of British life. However after a visit to Spain in 1851, he dramatically altered his style and he produced a large number of works depicting Spanish life. The painting was displayed at the Royal Academy Exhibition of 1865 held at the National Gallery, in London, where it received an enthusiastic reception, and again at the International Exhibition of 1873 in South Kensington.

== Art market ==
The painting was sold by £94,650 at Christie's, on 19 February 2003.

== Bibliography ==
- Boone, Mary Elizabeth. Vistas de España: American Views of Art and Life in Spain, 1860-1914. Yale University Press, 2007.
- Clarke, Deborah & Remington, Vanessa. Scottish Artists 1750-1900: From Caledonia to the Continent. Royal Collection Trust, 2015.
- Harris, Enriqueta, Macartney, Hilary & Glendinning, Nigel. Spanish Art in Britain and Ireland, 1750-1920. Tamesis, 2010.
