= Masoni =

Masoni may refer to:

- Masoni Island, an island in Central Sulawesi, Indonesia
- Monte Masoni, mountain of Lombardy
- John Masoni, former NASCAR Grand National Series car owner

== See also ==
- Massoni, surname
