= Young Ladies of the Village =

Painting by Gustave Courbet

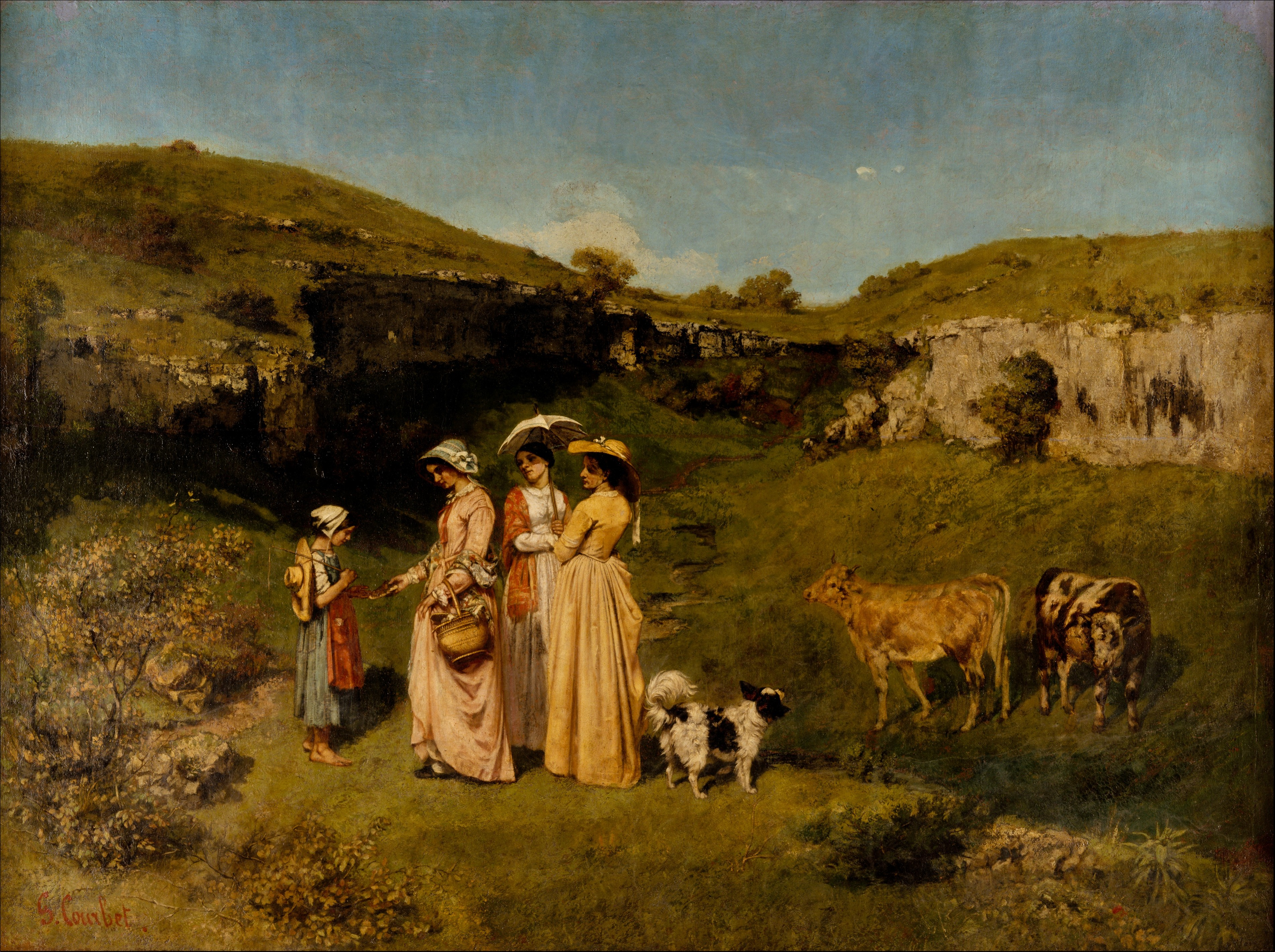
- Artist: Gustave Courbet
- Year: 1851-1852
- Medium: oil on canvas
- Dimensions: 194.9 cm × 261 cm (76.7 in × 103 in)
- Location: Metropolitan Museum of Art, New York

Young Ladies of the Village or The Village Maids (French: Les Demoiselles de village) is an 1852 oil-on-canvas painting by the French artist Gustave Courbet, now in the Metropolitan Museum of Art, in New York. It is signed bottom left "G. Courbet".

== Description ==
In the centre three young women, modelled by Courbet's three sisters Zoé, Zélie and Juliette, offer a barefoot peasant girl something to eat. One of the three holds an umbrella against the sun. A dog stands behind the trio, whilst to the right two cows graze in a hilly landscape with rocky outcrops and a sunny blue sky. The landscape draws on real locations near Ornans, Courbet's native area, and were re-used by him in other landscapes with and without human figures.

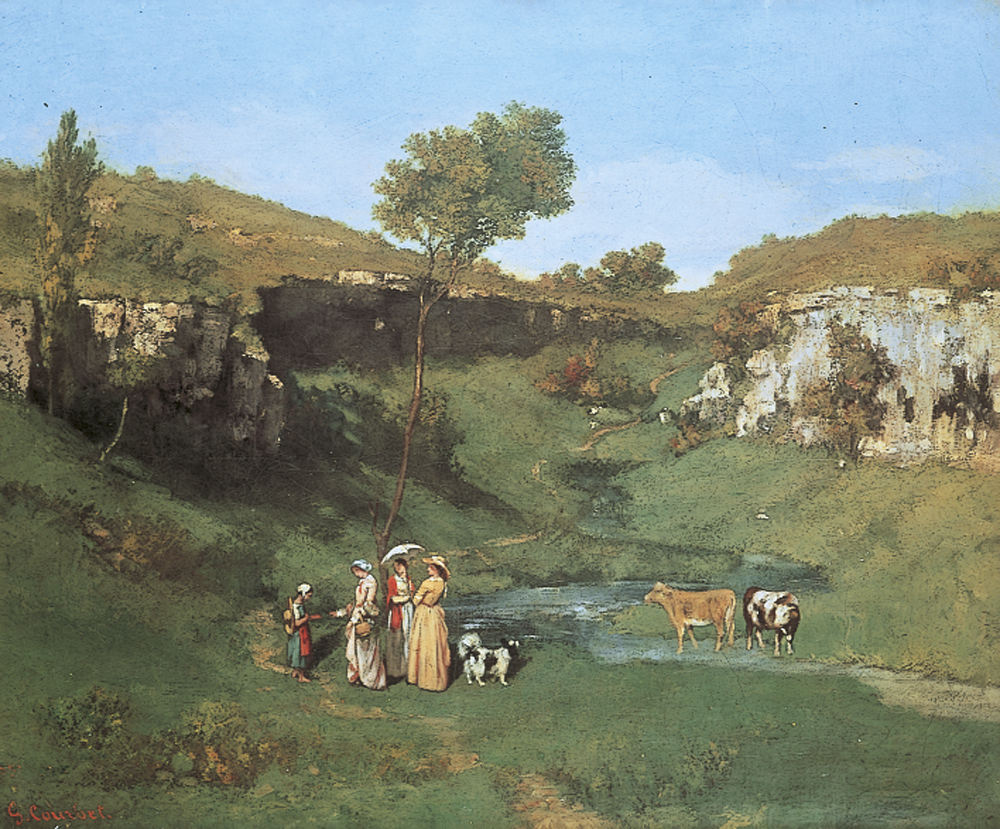
Young Ladies of the Village, 1851, Leeds Art Gallery

In the preparatory sketch for Young Ladies (1851, Leeds Art Gallery), the same figures are placed further back within a composition more dominated by vegetation and the landscape than the final work. The artist later redesigned the composition for an 1862 etching published by Alfred Cadart and Jules Luquet with different use of perspective

The same artist had previously painted the three sisters in his Three Sisters, the Stories of Grandmother Salvan (1846–1847, Curtis Galleries, Minneapolis).

== History ==
Courbet first exhibited the work at the Paris Salon in April 1852 entitled The Village Maids give alms to a cowherd in a valley near Ornans. It was immediately bought by the duc de Morny despite a public and press polemic against the work – for example, the art critic Théophile Gautier expressed reservations and felt the canvas was under-finished, whilst Gustave Planche, Eugène Loudun and Louis Énault felt it flouted the rules of perspective in the smallness of the figures relative to the cows and held the portrayal of the young women to be "rather ugly" and "incongruously diminished". The painting was displayed again in the 1855 Exposition universelle, provoking yet more criticism, this time against "this representation of provincial women dressed in Parisian fashion" provoking discomfort in its viewers. The painting provoked as much or even more discussion about Courbet as his Burial at Ornans and according to Michael Fried was one of his "breakthrough canvases" as part of a deliberate strategy to arouse scandal.

The poor reception of the work is explained by the social and historical context of the late Second French Republic – the rural electorate helped bring Louis-Napoléon Bonaparte to power as emperor and to keep him in power, yet the painting showed the Franche-Comté, a strongly republican area, forcing rich Parisians to face up to the harsh realities of the countryside. Rather than showing an idealised, tranquil and pacified countryside, it showed a potential enemy of middle-class city-dwellers, enriched by the industrial revolution and about to take part in the 1848 Revolution. Some saw the painting as the start of Courbet's political engagement, which took root both in his home-town and in his painting of the class struggle, as embodied in the tense eye contact between the women's lapdog (representing the arrogant middle class) and the young calves (symbolic of the peasant world about to erupt into rebellion). Others see it as simply reusing an old philosophical archetype of generously giving charity to the poor, albeit in a balanced and distanced manner far from the Roman Catholic aesthetic rules at the forefront of other painters' work, abandoning their high level of finish and heightening the format and line.

The Duchess of Morny resold the work to the hôtel Drouot in 1878 for 5000 francs. It arrived in the USA just before 1901. The art dealer Paul Durand-Ruel's New York branch exhibited it in June 1906 and – after passing through a number of different hands – Harry Payne Bingham offered it to its present owners in 1940.

== Bibliography ==
- (in French) Laurence Des Cars (musée d'Orsay), Dominique de Font-Réauls (musée d'Orsay), Gary Tinterow (Metropolitan Museum of Art) and Michel Hilaire (Musée Fabre), Gustave Courbet : Exposition Paris, New York, Montpellier 2007-2008, Réunion des musées nationaux, 2007 (ISBN 978-2-7118-5297-0).
