= The Wheat Sifters =

Oil painting by Gustave Courbet

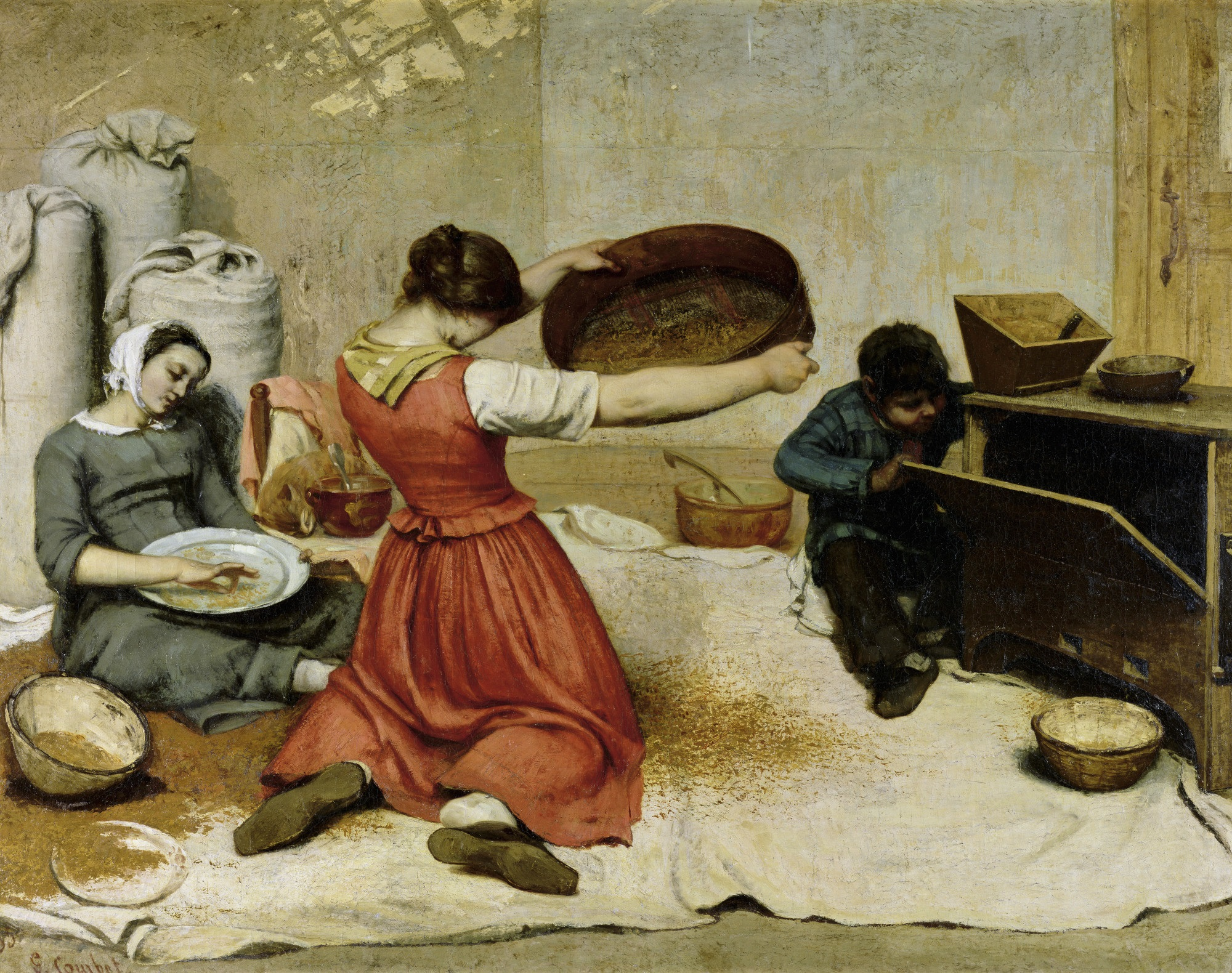
- Artist: Gustave Courbet
- Year: 1854
- Type: Oil painting
- Dimensions: 131 cm × 167 cm (52 in × 66 in)
- Location: Musée des Beaux-Arts de Nantes; Nantes

The Wheat Sifters (Les Cribleuses de Blé) is an oil-on-canvas painting created in 1854 by the French Realist painter Gustave Courbet in his hometown of Ornans.

Painted during the winter of 1853-1854, the work depicts three figures engaged in the act of winnowing, or sifting grain. The central figure, seen from behind, operates a large circular sieve. Behind her, to the left, another woman sits cross-legged and reclining as she sorts grain by hand. On the right, a young boy peers into a tarare, an early mechanical device used to clean grain.

The young women in the painting are believed to be Courbet's sisters: Zoë and Juliette. Zoë is depicted as the central figure, and Juliette is the seated figure to the left. The boy is most likely Désiré Binet, the painter's illegitimate son. He would have been six years old when Courbet began working on the painting.

It was exhibited at the Salon of 1855 in Paris, then in 1861 at the ninth exhibition of the Society of Friends of the Art of Nantes, which then bought the painting for the Musée des Beaux-Arts de Nantes.

== Context ==
In addition to The Wheat Sifters, Courbet worked on four pieces during the winter of 1853-1854. The painting belongs to the Realism movement. It depicts rural life and highlights physical demands of agricultural labor. Courbet imagined the work as belonging to the Young Ladies of the Village series, aiming to capture the customs of life in his home region of Franche-Comté. Earlier versions of the painting's title reflect this goal. When the painting was shown in Brussels in 1857, it was titled The Grain Sifters: A Scene of Agricultural Life in Franche-Comté. On display in Besançon in 1860, it was called The Grain Sifters or the Children of the Farmers of Doubs.

In an 1854 letter to the art critic Champfleury, Courbet informed his friend that he had finished a painting of country life and called it a "strange painting." The muscularity of the central figure and her thrust-out arms prompted critics to label the work as "indecent." The onerous and challenging labor was exaggerated by a caricature done by Charles Amédée de Noé, also known as Cham. In the caption of the print, Cham emphasized the filthiness of the painting in his own drawing, by explaining that the sifter was unable to find time or space to clean herself.

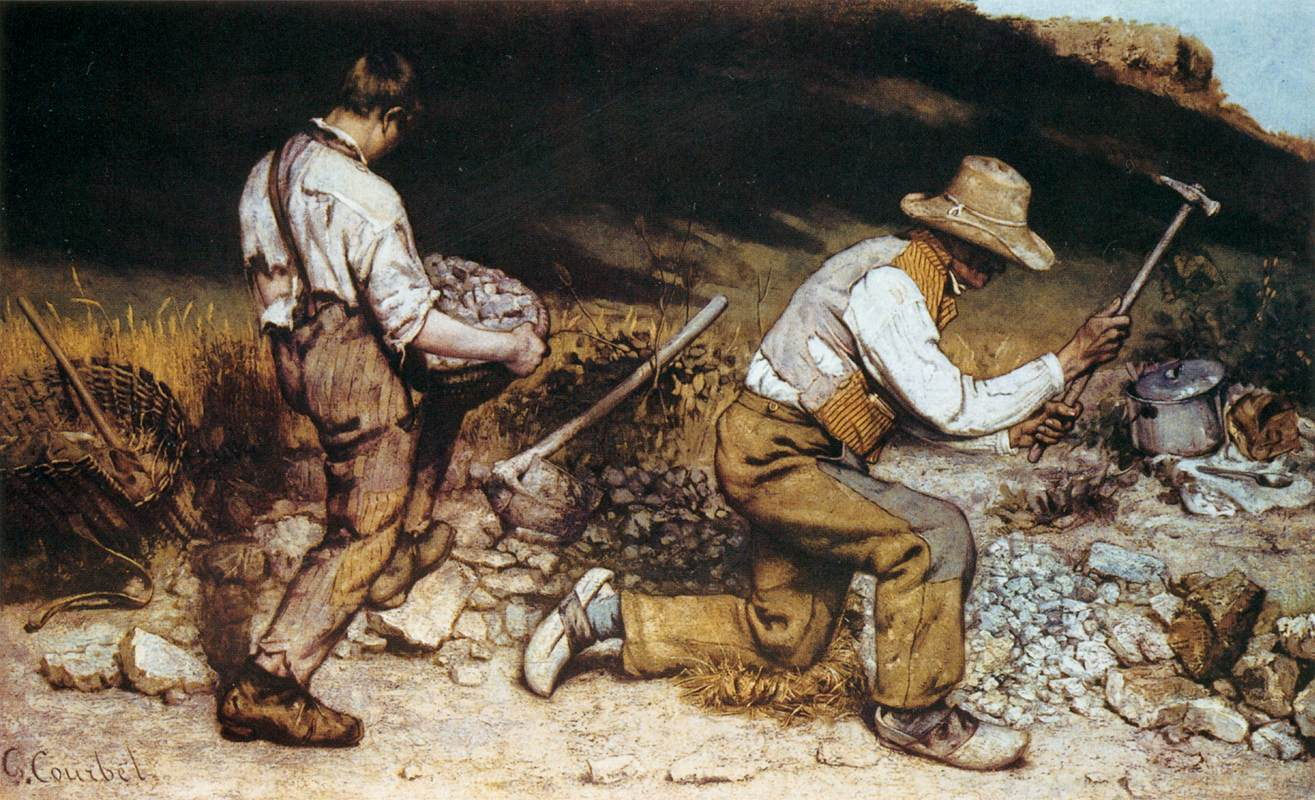
Gustave Courbet, The Stone Breakers, 1849-1850

Scholars have discussed The Wheat Sifters in relation to period ideas about irony and allegory. According to Petra ten-Doesschate Chu, Courbet shifted between these modes, even though irony was seen as more modern and allegory was viewed as more outdated. Chu argues that Sifters was Courbet's most significant new work shown at the 1855 Exposition Universelle, as an attempt to create a modern allegory of labor. Courbet had previously produced an allegorical commentary on labor in The Stone Breakers. The two works are similar in their depiction of physically demanding work, the use and manipulation of raw materials such as grain and stone, and anonymous figures that face away from the viewer.

== Composition and analysis ==
The figures in The Wheat Sifters are not portrayed as distinct individuals. Their faces are mostly hidden and Courbet instead draws attention to the tools, clothing, and scattered grain to emphasize the messy, physical nature of agricultural labor. The central figure dominates the scene. Her open legs and shifting body paired with the motion of the sieve and the round utensils create a continuous, circular rhythm that drives the composition as a cohesive whole. The assorted bowls, sacks of grain, and the utensils create a real and complex space. Light and texture highlight the material reality of agricultural customs, while the impasto intensifies the depiction of labor.

Michael Fried interprets the composition as a reflection of Courbet's own engagement with painting. Fried argues that the figures in the painting function as a surrogate for the painter and the painter-beholder. The kneeling sifter is Courbet's right hand and brush; the seated sifter is the left hand palette; the sifted grain is paint on a canvas; and the shadow in the upper-left corner represents the canvas itself. The young boy looking into the tarare creates depth and reflects the limits of vision in the process of making art.

According to Fried, Courbet projects himself into the painting as both an active and passive participant. The kneeling sifter represents the painter's active hand. In contrast, the seated sifter embodies the passive hand and observer, making the painter simultaneously both the subject and object of the act of painting. Scholars like Fried have thought about the passive and active components of the painting as a possible reference to pregnancy and reproduction. The boy looking into the tarare, the round dish on the seated sifter's lap, and the central's sifter thrust into the scene invite discussion of feminine reproduction in relation to masculine cultural work.

Linda Nochlin situates the painting within the context of 19th-century concerns about the status of the working classes and women. Peasant women's labor was seen as natural, necessary, and pious, and discussion of working women revolved around sexuality, morality, and class hierarchy. Nochlin challenges overly sexual readings of the painting. She claims that the force and muscularity of the central woman represent 19th-century fetishized imagery of strong working-class women.

The painting also reflects Courbet's attempt to capture rural customs and acknowledge technological advancements. Courbet depicts three kinds of grain sifting. The left figure shows grain being sorted by hand, the center uses a large sieve, and the tarare represents growing mechanization at a time when women were being driven out of harvesting and winnowing on more progressive farms. Nochlin places the women represented in this piece into history, suggesting that the methods of agricultural work change, as does the status of female labor.
