= Hans Brandstetter =

Austrian sculptor (1854–1925)

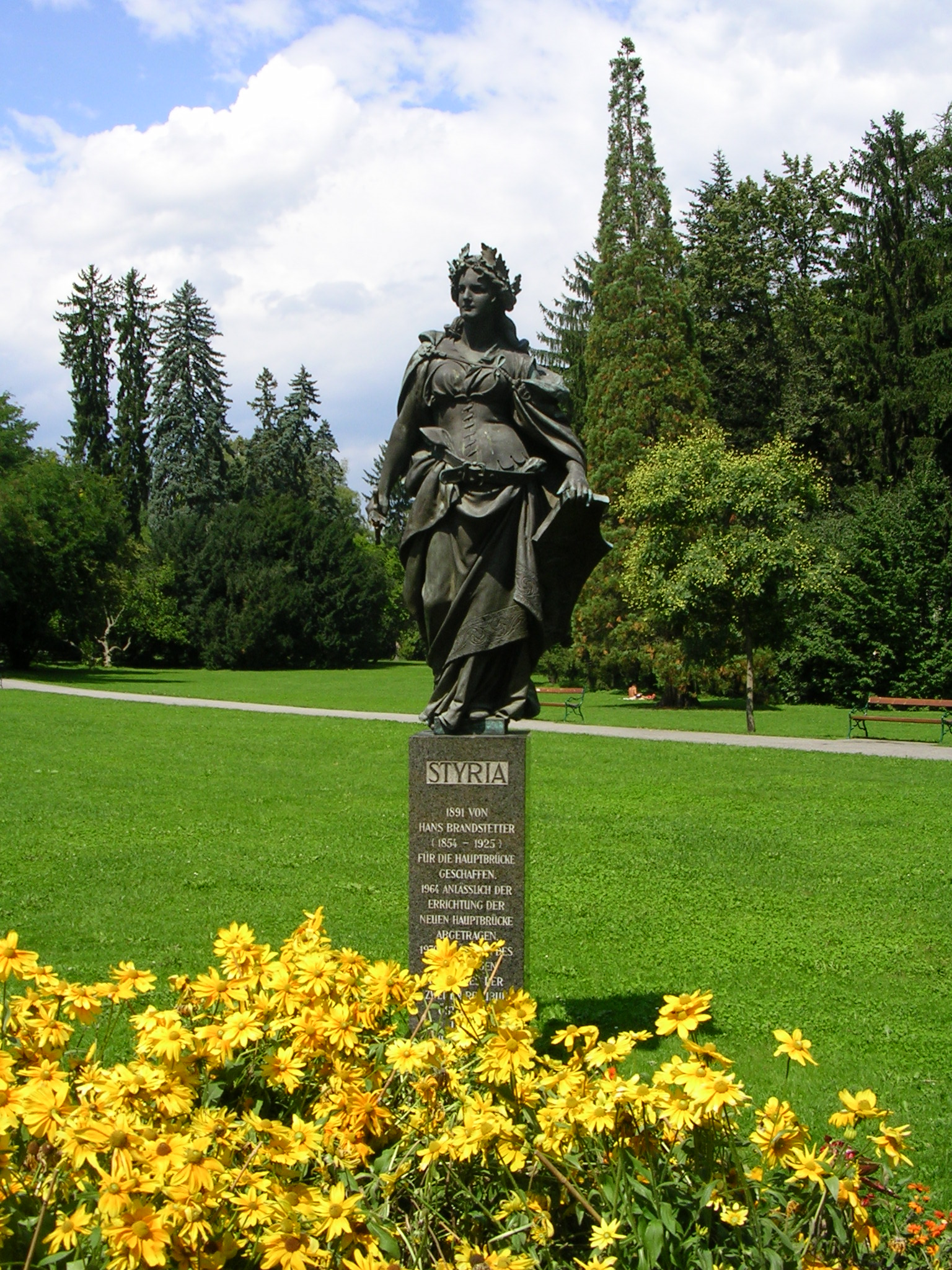
Styria by Hans Brandstetter; it decorated Graz's main bridge, but since the bridge's reconstruction resides in the city park

Hans Brandstetter (23 January 1854 – 4 January 1925) was an Austrian sculptor.

== Biography ==
Brandstetter was born in Hitzendorf. He was a pupil of Edmund von Hellmer at the Academy of Arts, Vienna. His first works, "The Flight of Lot from Sodom," “The Flute-Player," and "Plato," were honored with the prize given by the Academy. Among his later productions, the following are especially noteworthy: “The Forest Lily,” a bronze statue (City Park, Graz), “Prometheus,” and “The Return of the Prodigal.” He died, aged 70, in Graz.
