= Eugène Loudun =

French writer, art critic and journalist

Eugène Balleyguier (1818-1898) was a French writer, art critic and journalist. He was born in Loudun and died in Paris.

== Selected works ==
Sources:

- Du présent et de l'avenir de la Révolution (1848)
- La Vendée - Le pays, les mœurs, la guerre (1849) (le Sudoc donne 1873)
- Le Salon de 1852 (1852), deux tirages
- Le général Charles Abbatucci (1854)
- L'Angleterre et l'Allemagne en France : de l'influence des idées anglaises et germaniques sur l'esprit français (1854)
- Les Derniers orateurs (1855)
- Le salon de 1855 : exposition universelle des beaux-arts (1855)
- Études sur les œuvres de Napoléon III (1857)
- Le Salon de 1857 (1857)
- Étude sur les œuvres de Napoléon III (1857)
- Les Victoires de l'Empire - Campagnes d'Italie, d'Égypte, d'Autriche, de Prusse, de Russie, de France et de Crimée (1859; four editions)
- La Bretagne; paysage et récits (1861)
- Les Pères de l'Église - Choix de lectures morales (1861)
- Les Trois races, ou les Allemands, les Anglais et les Français (1861-1863)
- Les Deux Paganismes (1865)
- Les Nouveaux Jacobins (1869)
- Journal d'un Parisien pendant la révolution de septembre et la Commune (1872)
- Les Précurseurs de la Révolution (1875)
- Saint-Just (1876)
- Le Mal et le Bien - Tableau de l'histoire universelle du monde païen et du monde chrétien, 5 vol. (1876-1888)
- Les ignorances de la science moderne (1878)
- Son Altesse le Prince impérial (1879)
- Les Découvertes de la science sans Dieu (1884)
- Journal de Fidus sous la République opportuniste, de la mort du prince impérial jusqu'à la mort de Gambetta 5 vol. (1885-1890)
- L'Italie moderne (1886)
- Souvenirs d'un impérialiste : Journal de dix ans (1886; two volumes)
- Notes sur ma vie (1998)

== Bibliography ==
- Eugène Loudun, Notes sur ma vie (1818-1867), Lettres choisies (1838-1898), édition présentée, établie et annotée par Gérard Jubert, PSR éditions, La Roche-Rigaud, 1998.
