= The Moorland =

Painting by John William Inchbold

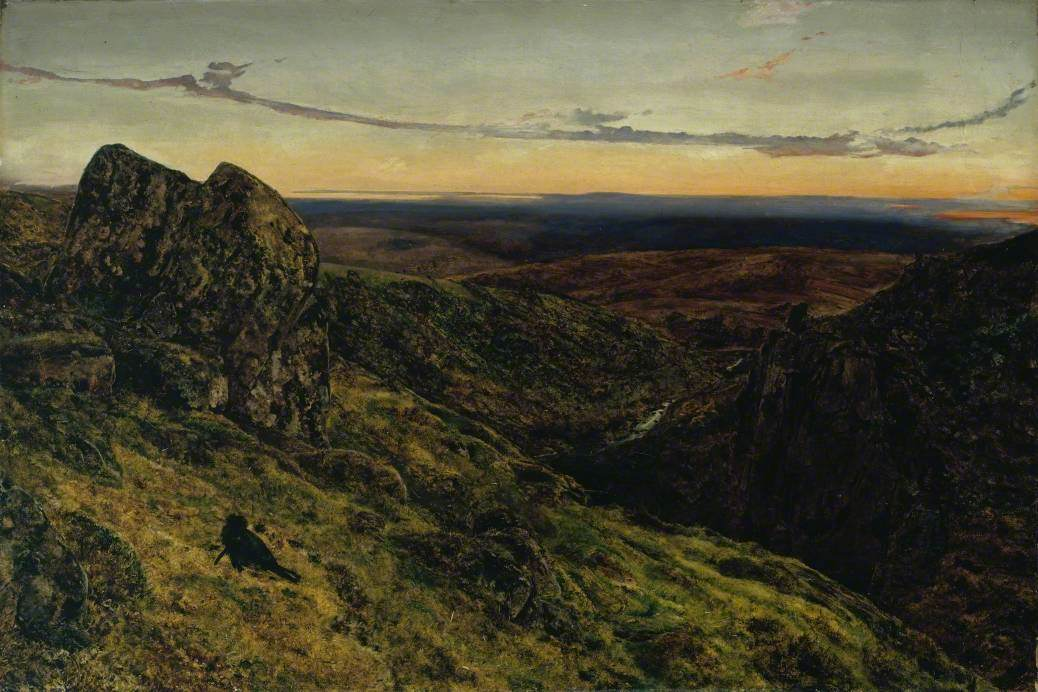
- Artist: John William Inchbold
- Year: 1854
- Type: Oil on canvas, landscape painting
- Dimensions: 53.3 cm × 35.6 cm (21.0 in × 14.0 in)
- Location: Tate Britain, London

The Moorland is a landscape painting by the British artist John William Inchbold in 1854. Also known by the title Dewar-stone, Dartmoor if features a view of Dewerstone in Dartmoor. The eerie view of the rocks overlooking the River Plym is Pre-Raphaelite in style. The picture makes reference to the poem Dartmoor by Noel Thomas Carrington and the legend of the "dewer" whose black dogs would drive travellers over the cliffs, that was an inspiration for Arthur Conan Doyle The Hound of the Baskervilles.

The painting was displayed at the Royal Academy Exhibition of 1855 at the National Gallery and was praised by the art critic John Ruskin as "the only thoroughly good landscape in the rooms of the Academy". Today the painting is in the Tate Britain in London, having been added to the collection in 1896.

== Bibliography ==
- Newall, Christopher. John William Inchbold: Pre-Raphaelite Landscape Artist. Leeds City Art Galleries, 1993.
- Payne, Christiana. John Brett: Pre-Raphaelite Landscape Painter. Yale University Press, 2010
- Staley, Allen. Pre-Raphaelite Vision: Truth to Nature. Harry N. Abrams, 2004.
