= Francesco Porzio (sculptor) =

Italian sculptor (1854–1934)

Francesco Porzio (1854–1934) was an Italian sculptor. He was awarded an honorable mention at the Paris Salon of 1907 for his bronze sculpture ''Gamine'' (en The Brat).

Among Porzio's most noted works are his statue of Giuseppe Garibaldi in Vercelli, Piedmont and ''Defense of Casale'' in Casale Monferrato, Piedmont.
