= The Letter Writer of Seville =

Painting by John Phillip

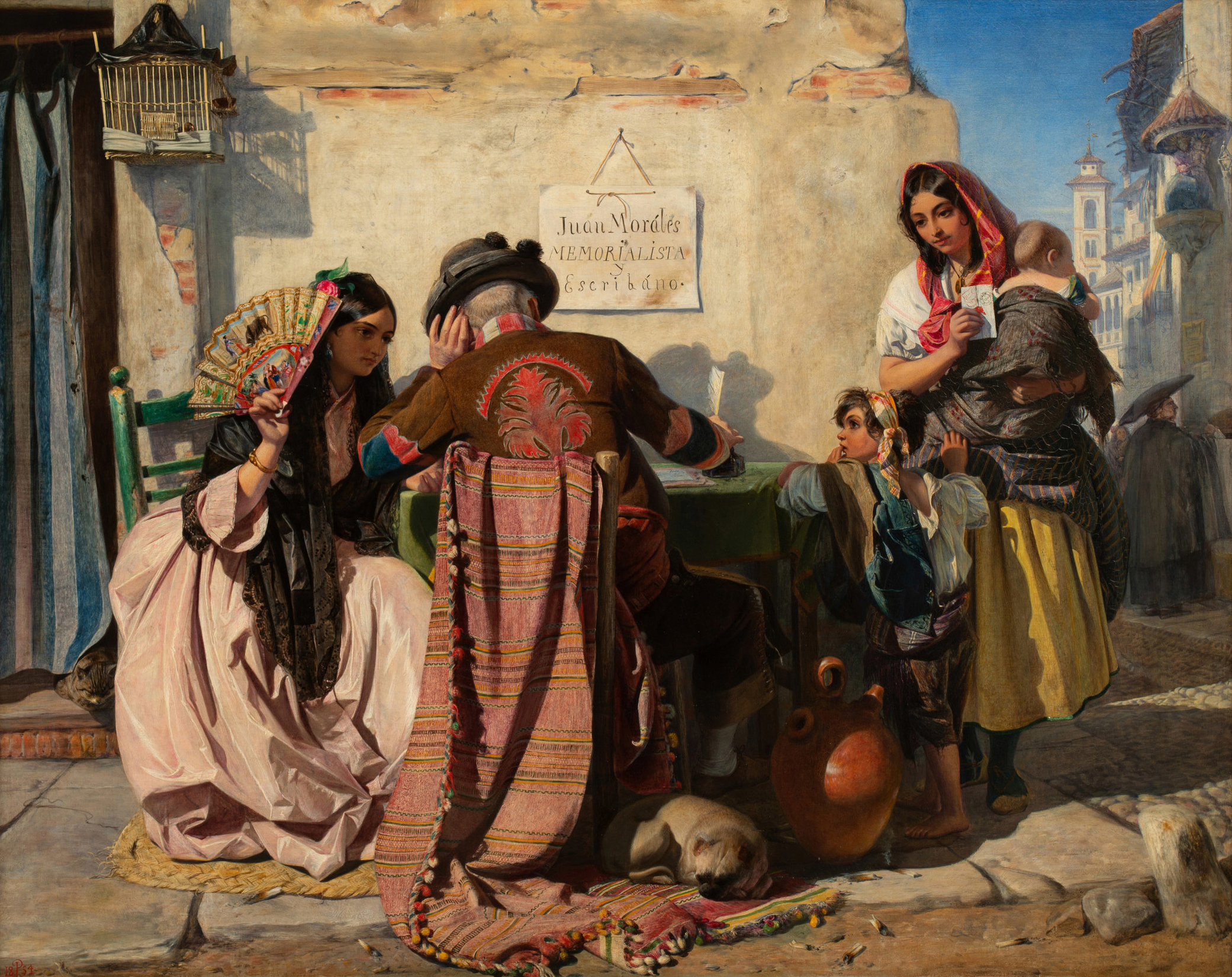
- Artist: John Phillip
- Year: 1854
- Type: Oil on canvas, genre painting
- Dimensions: 78.4 cm × 99.1 cm (30.9 in × 39.0 in)
- Location: Royal Collection

The Letter Writer of Seville is an oil on canvas genre painting by the British artist John Phillip, from 1854. It is held at the Royal Collection.

== History and description ==
The Scottish painter Phillip settled in London where he was a member of The Clique artistic group. After several visits to Andalucía from 1851 onwards he switched from depictions of Scottish rural life to Spanish scenes. Set in Seville, where illiteracy remained high, it shows a professional letter writer taking dictation from a young woman dressed in a mantilla, who takes cover from the Sun with her fan. Nearby a woman waits with her children to have a letter read out to her. The scene takes place in a very sunny day, with the letter writer's own dog resting near him. The man is named Juan Moráles, and his name appears in a placard above him in a wall.

It was exhibited at the Royal Academy's 1854 Summer Exhibition where it was praised for its "atmosphere, local character and brilliant colouring". It was also acclaimed when exhibited at the International Exhibition in Paris in 1855. It was acquired by Prince Albert on behalf of Queen Victoria and was hung in Osborne House on the Isle of Wight. It remains in the Royal Collection.

== Bibliography ==
- Boone, Mary Elizabeth. Vistas de España: American Views of Art and Life in Spain, 1860-1914. Yale University Press, 2007.
- Clarke, Deborah & Remington, Vanessa. Scottish Artists 1750-1900: From Caledonia to the Continent. Royal Collection Trust, 2015.
