= Dewerstone =

Iron Age hill fort in Devon, England

Coordinates: 50.455°N 4.043°W

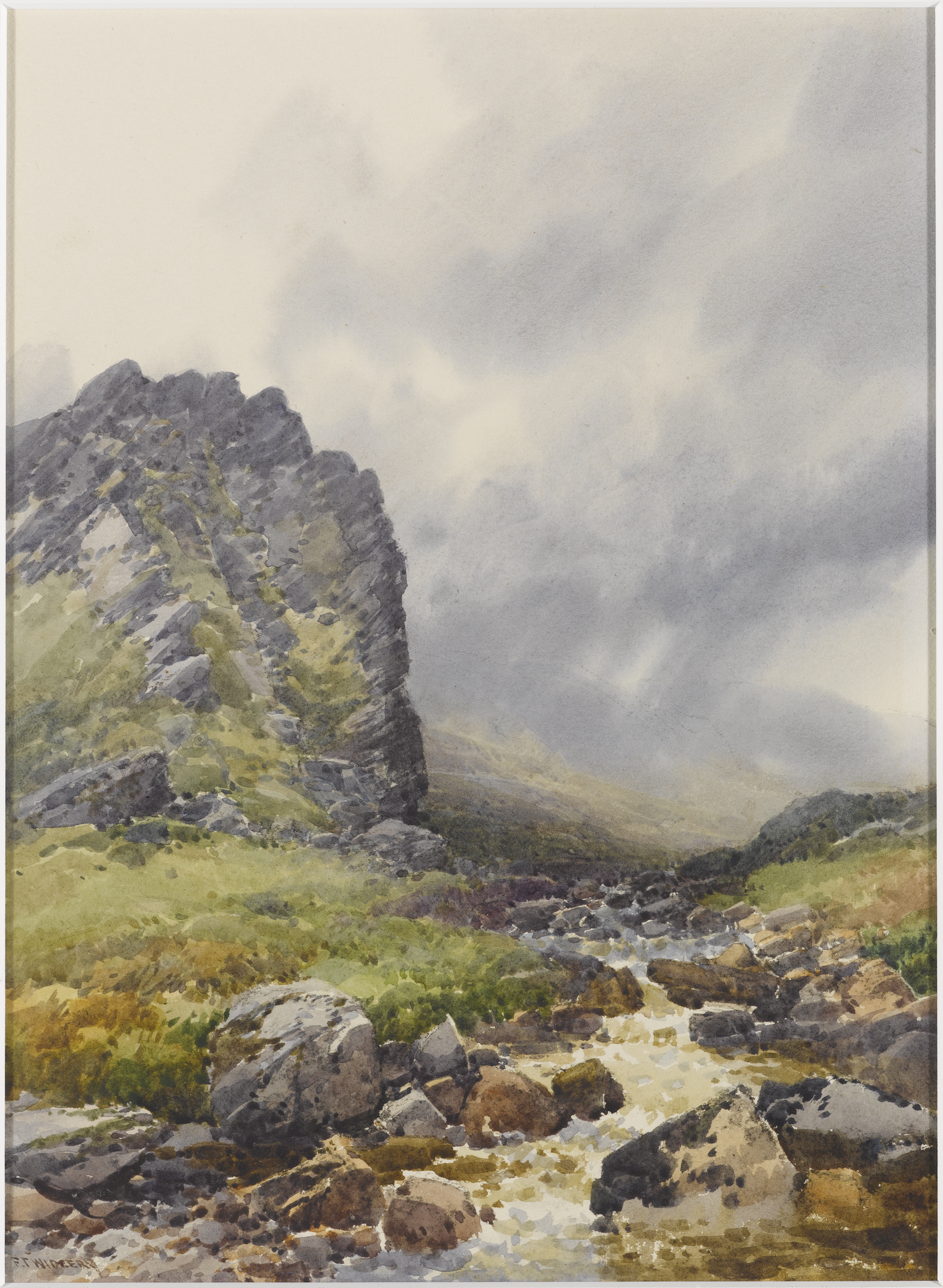
Dewerstone painted by Frederick John Widgery in 1890 to 1896. Here, Widgery depicts the Plym stream in the moor, a nearby crag in the leftmost foreground.

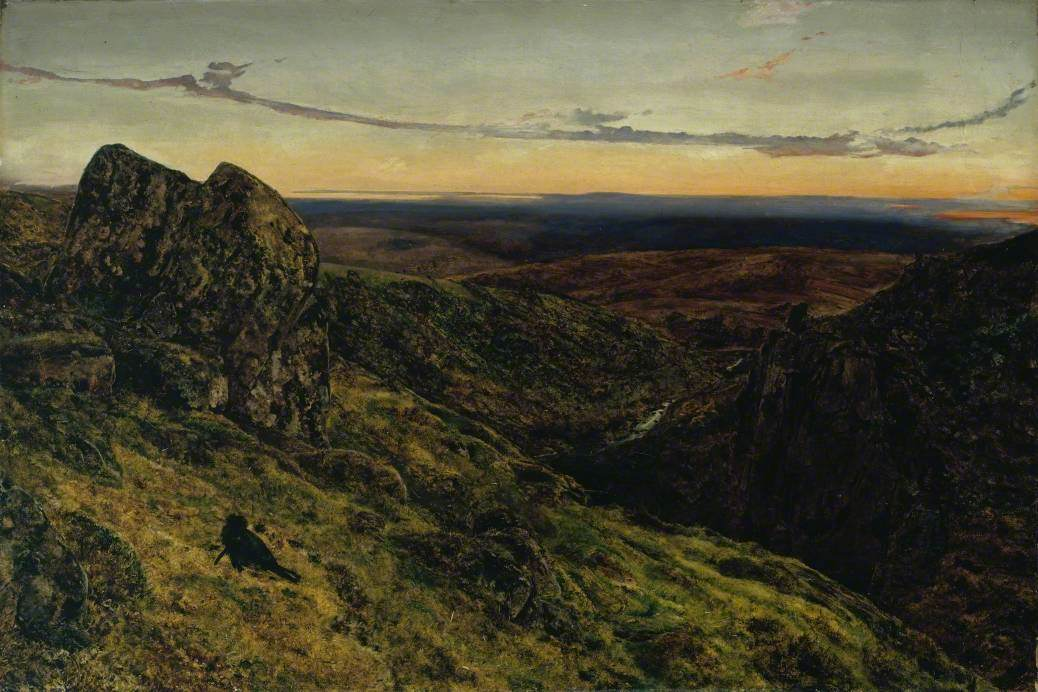
The Moorland by John William Inchbold, 1854

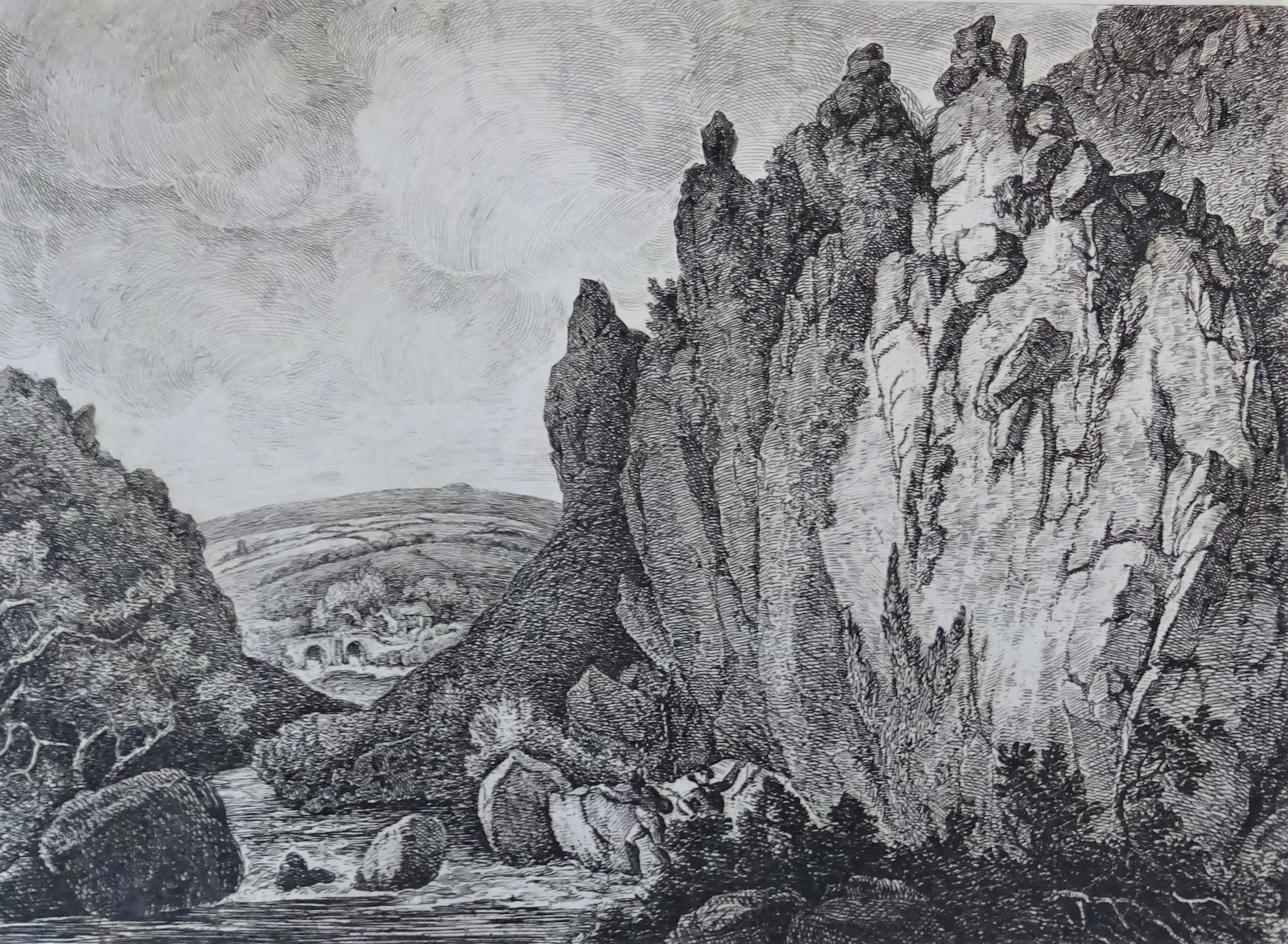
Dewerstone Rocks in 1805

Dewerstone is the site of an Iron Age Hill fort on a rocky promontory overlooking the River Plym on the South West edge of Dartmoor to the North of Plympton in Devon. The fort consists of ramparts to the Northern side of the promontory at approx 210 Metres above Sea Level.

"Dewer" is an ancient Celtic word for the Devil, and Dartmoor tradition has it that the Devil, riding a gigantic black horse, gallops across the Moor each night and leads a phantom pack of black hounds to chase weary or foolish humans over the Dewerstone to their deaths. Another legend has it that a shepherd actually saw the black hounds devouring an unfortunate man on his way home from the fields one night.

The area is also popular with climbers, with over 100 climbs listed.
