= John William Inchbold =

English painter (1830–1888)

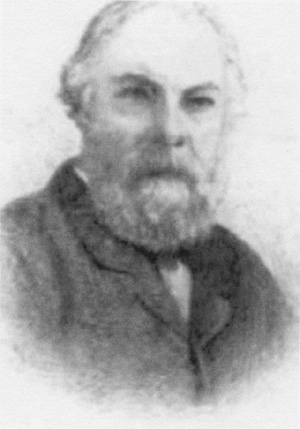
Portrait of John William Inchbold (ca. 1875)

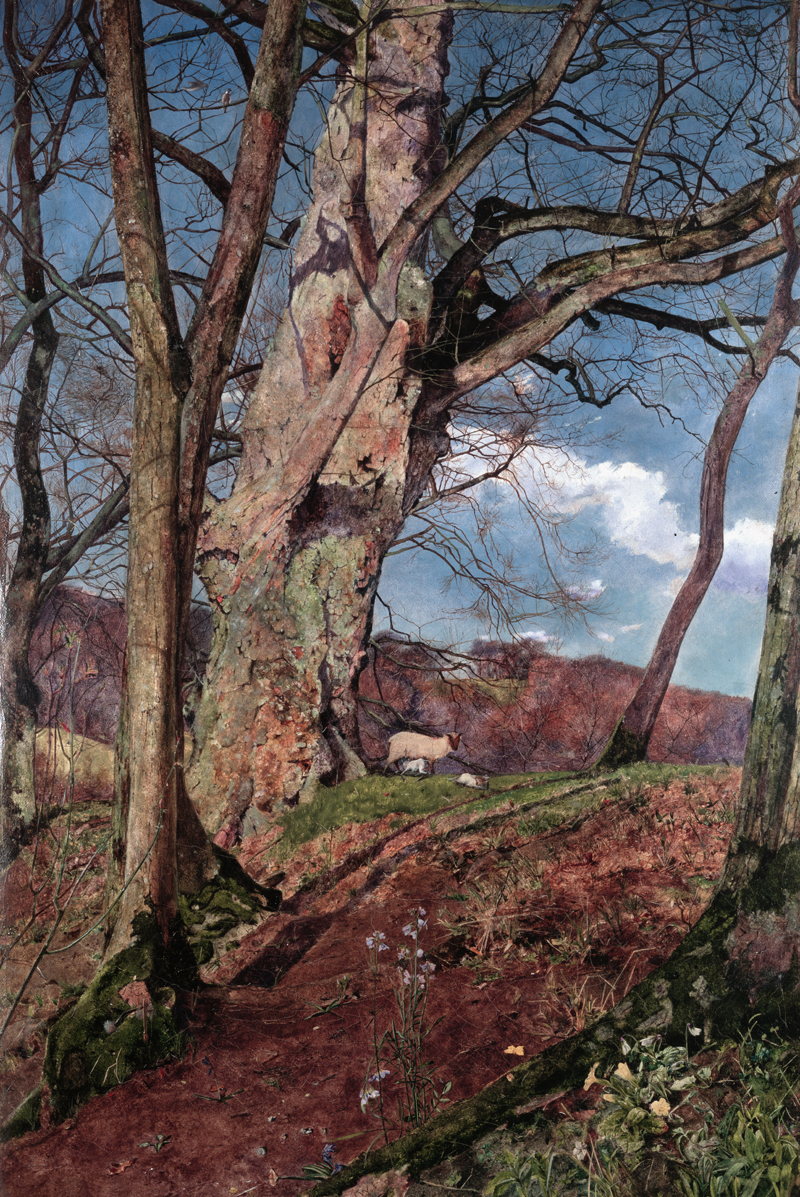
A Study, in March (1855)

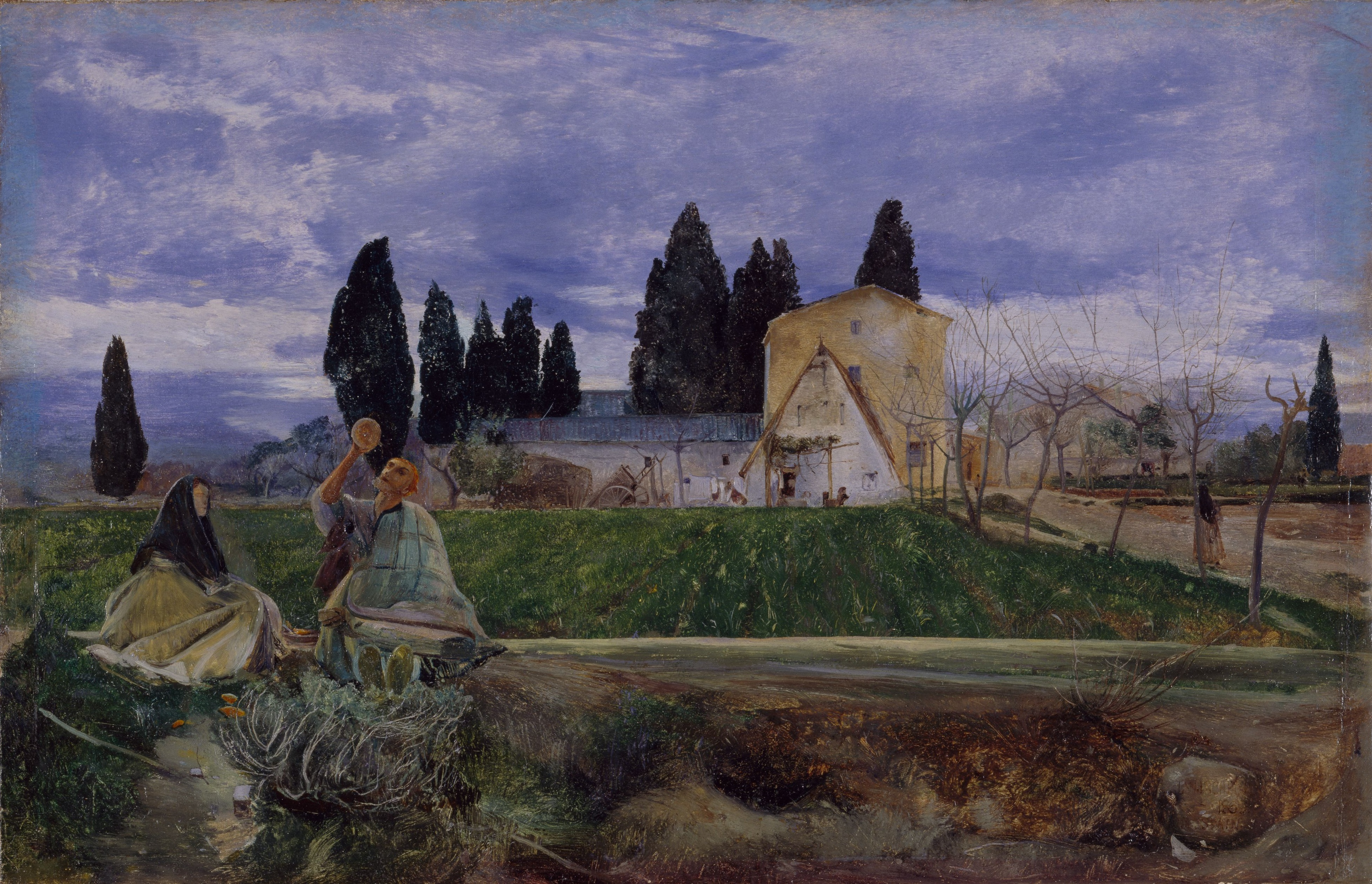
Springtime in Spain, near Gordella (c.1869).

John William Inchbold (29 August 1830 – 23 January 1888) was an English painter who was born in Leeds, Yorkshire. His style was influenced by the Pre-Raphaelite Brotherhood. He was the son of a Yorkshire newspaper owner, Thomas Inchbold.

== Biography ==
Inchbold was born 29 April 1830 at Leeds, Yorkshire, where his father, Thomas Inchbold, was the proprietor and editor of the Leeds Intelligencer. Having shown an early talent for drawing he moved to London and became a draughtsman in the lithographic works of Day and Haghe.

Inchbold became a pupil of Louis Haghe, the water-colour painter, and was a student at the Royal Academy in 1847. He exhibited at the Society of British Artists in 1849, at the Academy from 1851. At first he worked in watercolour in a free style, but his first exhibited oil painting, shown at the Academy in 1852 showed the influence of the Pre-Raphaelite movement, and in 1855 he gained the enthusiastic praise of John Ruskin for The Moorland, which he painted to illustrate a passage from Tennyson's Locksley Hall.

Inchbold spent much of the later part of his life abroad, mainly in Switzerland, where he had spent some time with Ruskin in the mid-1850s. His best-known works are probably On the Lake of Thun (1860), Tintagel (1862), Gordale Scar (1876) and Drifting (1883); the last named was once in the possession of Coventry Patmore. Tennyson, Browning, Lord Houghton, and Sir Henry Thompson were among his admirers and supporters, and in Dr Russell Reynolds he found a liberal and discriminating patron. A year or two before his death he had returned from Algeria with a large collection of sketches, in which the ordinary defects of his manner were less apparent. He died of heart disease at Headingley in Leeds, on 23 January 1888. His memory was honoured by Swinburne in a funeral ode.

Inchbold published a book of sonnets called Annus Amoris in 1876.

== List of works ==
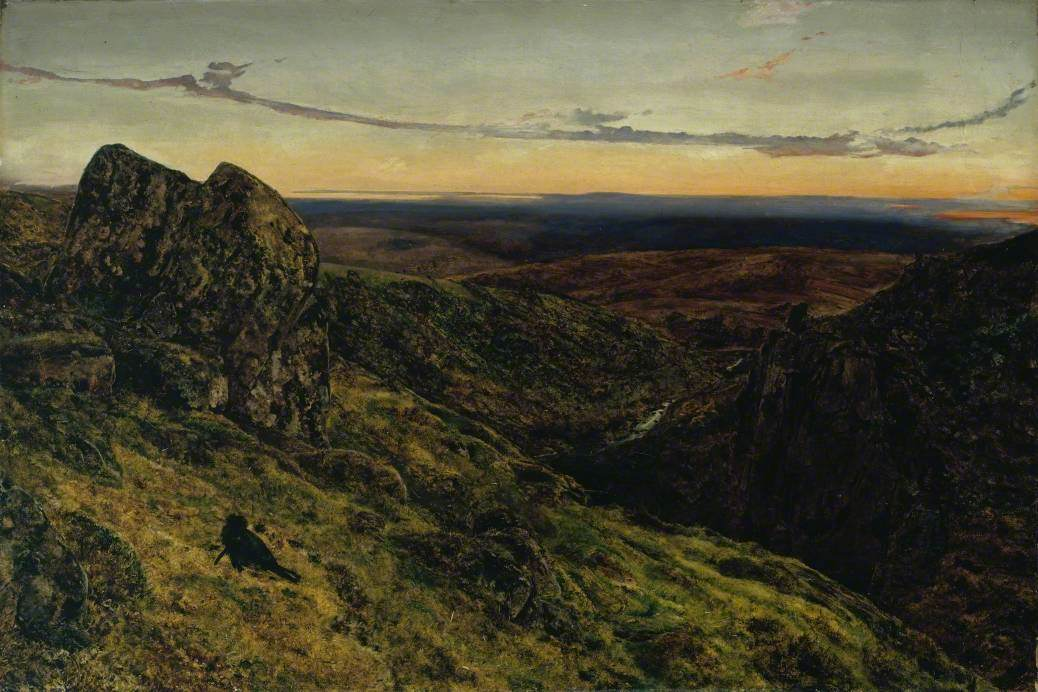
The Moorland, 1854

- The Moorland (Dewar-stone, Dartmoor) (1854), Tate Britain, London.
- Anstey's Cove, Devon (1854), Fitzwilliam Museum, Cambridge.
- Devonshire Coast (1855), Tate Britain, London.
- The White Doe of Rylstone (At Bolton) (1855), Leeds City Art Gallery.
- A Study, in March or In Early Spring (1855), Ashmolean Museum, Oxford.
- Cuillin Ridge, Skye, from Sligachan (1856), Ashmolean Museum, Oxford.
- Study from Nature, Evening (1857)
- Fishermen at Sunset (1859–60), Tate Britain, London.
- Lugano (a Pillar in the Foreground) 1861, Tate Britain, London.
- Two Men Scything 1861, Tate Britain, London.
- Tintagel 1861, Tate Britain, London.
- A Sunlit Wood 1861, Tate Britain, London.
- A Man Digging on the Shore 1862, Tate Britain, London.
- Venice: A Girl in a Doorway 1862-4, Tate Britain, London.
- Tintagel 1862, Tate Britain, London.
- Inundation at St Marks 1863-4, Tate Britain, London.
- San Giorgio from the Ducal Palace 1863-5, Tate Britain, London.
- Peat Burning circa 1864-6, Tate Britain, London.
- A Young Palm, Valentia 1865, Tate Britain, London.
- A House in Spain, with a Minaret 1865, Tate Britain, London.
- Shore Scene with Groups of Figures 1865, Tate Britain, London.
- Manzanares, Madrid 1866, Tate Britain, London.
- The Village Cross, Spain 1866, Tate Britain, London.
- Recollection. Barden Fells 1866, Tate Britain, London.
- Recollection, Strid, Barden Tower 1866, Tate Britain, London.
- Stonehenge from the East (1866-9), Society of Antiquaries of London, London.
- Gate of the Sea, Venice (1873)
- Harvest Field, Stratford-Upon-Avon 1874, Leeds Art Gallery
- Gordale Scar, Yorkshire exhibited 1876, Tate Britain, London.
- The Lake of Geneva (c.1880-82)
- A Syrian Girl at a Balcony overlooking a Bay, Tate Britain, London.
- A Rocky Coast, Tate Britain, London.
- A Wide Landscape, Tate Britain, London.
- Arabian Merchants, Tate Britain, London.
- A Shepherd on the Downs, Tate Britain, London.
- A Girl Seated on Rocks in a Wood, Tate Britain, London.
- Forest of Fontainebleau: A Chestnut Tree, Tate Britain, London.
- Valencia. The Well, Tate Britain, London.
- Venice, Nocturne. San Giorgio Maggiore, Tate Britain, London.
- Fairy Dell. A Man and a Dog in a Sunlit Clearing, Tate Britain, London.
- A Procession of Peasants among Trees, Tate Britain, London.
- Forest of Fontainebleau: A Peasant outside a Church under Trees, Tate Britain, London.
- Forest of Fontainebleau: A Path in the Woods, Tate Britain, London.
- Whilst Waiting for the Train, Swiss Alps, Tate Britain, London.
- A Rocky Coast, Tate Britain, London.
- Coast Scene with Fishing Boats and Rainbows, Tate Britain, London.
- Mountain Vale, Tate Britain, London.
- The Lake of Lucerne, Victoria and Albert Museum, London.
- From Pallano to the Dent du Midi 1884, Private collection, exhib. Royal Academy, London, 1885.
