= Egisto Massoni =

Italian painter (1854–1929)

- Born: 1854; Pisa, Italy
- Died: 1929; Venice, Italy
- Occupation: painter

Egisto Massoni (Pisa, 1854 – Venice, 1929) was an Italian painter, of vedute and vistas dal vero. He painted both in oil and watercolor.

== Biography ==
Egisto Massoni was a resident at Pisa. He painted landscapes of the countryside around Rome and seascapes and vedute of Venice. At Turin, in 1884, he exhibited two paintings: In laguna a Venezia and A Canal at Venice. At the 1894 Societa degli Amatori e Cultori delle Belli Arti in Rome, he exhibited Laguna Veneta a Sottomarina.
