= British paintings in the Museo del Prado =

Collection of paintings

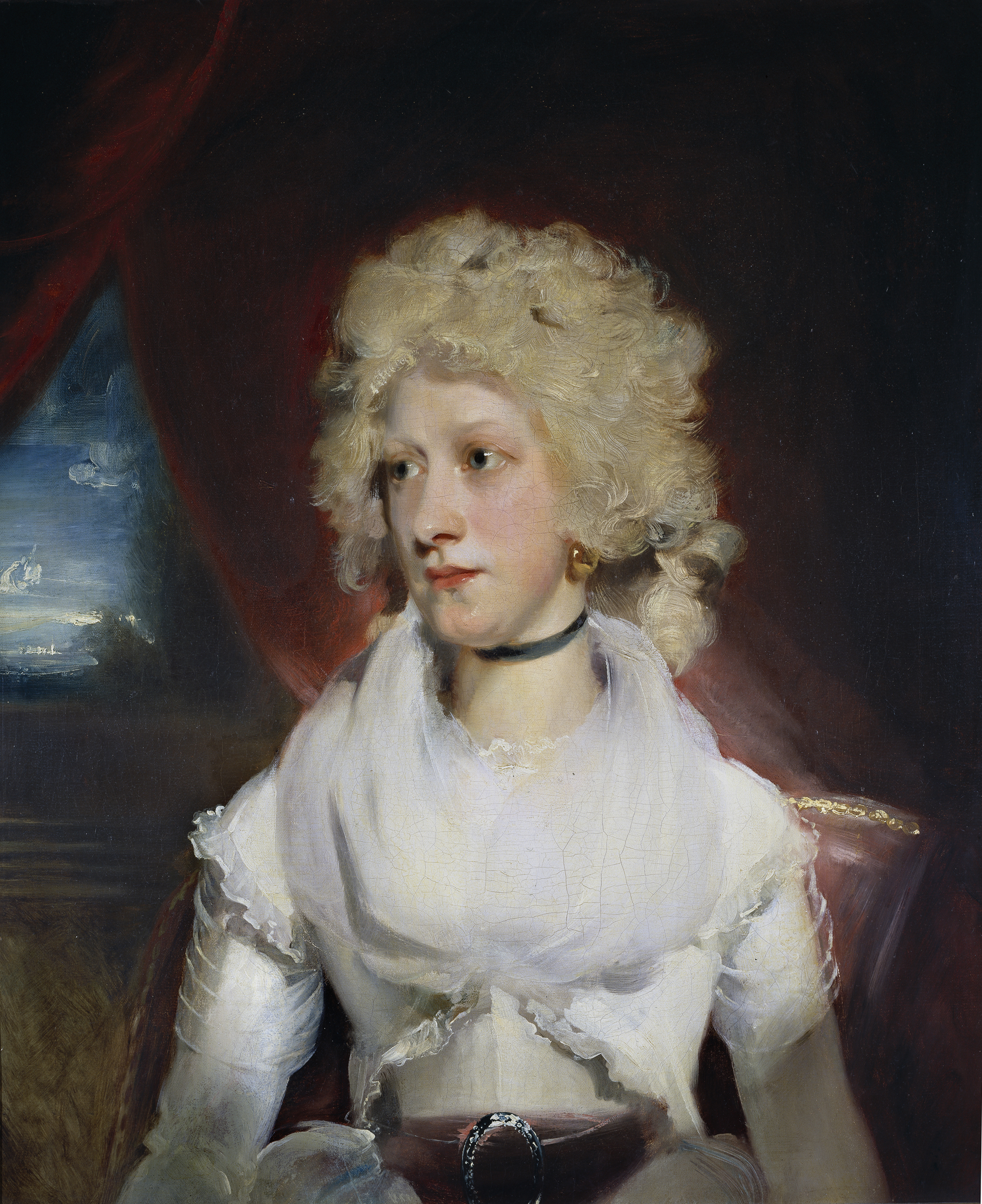
Miss Martha Carr, c. 1789, portrait by Thomas Lawrence.

The collection of twenty-eight British paintings in the Museo del Prado is one of only two significant collections of British art in Spain - the other is the Museo Lázaro Galdiano, a private collection influenced by the personal taste of Paula Florido, the wife of its founder José Lázaro Galdiano. There is little British art in the former Spanish royal collection due to the English and Scottish Reformations and the ensuing tensions between Spain, England and Scotland. The works entered the collection through both purchase and donation, two in the 1880s and the rest mostly in the 20th century.

The twenty-eight works do not include works by continental artists active in England such as Hans Holbein the Younger, John de Critz, Peter Lely, Godfrey Kneller, Daniel Mytens, Simon Dubois and Antony van Dyck, which are classified elsewhere in the Prado collection. Most of the twenty-eight works are portraits produced between 1750 and 1850. Four are by David Roberts, three by Thomas Lawrence and two each by Thomas Gainsborough, John Hoppner, Joshua Reynolds, George Romney and Martin Archer Shee. The remaining eleven artists are represented by a single work each. There are also two other works of doubtful attribution - Portrait of Ferdinand VII of Spain (doubtfully attributed to William Collins) and Portrait of a Man, Believed to be Gonzalo José de Vilches, First Count of Vilches (doubtfully attributed to John Phillip).

== Artists represented ==
=== Portraiture ===
- Thomas Gainsborough (Portrait of Dr Isaac Henrique Sequiera, Portrait of Robert Butcher of Walthamstow)
- Joshua Reynolds (Portrait of a Clergyman, Portrait of James Bourdieu)
- Thomas Lawrence (Portrait of John Fane, 10th Earl of Westmoreland, A Lady of the Storer Family, Miss Martha Carr)
- George Romney (Portrait of an English Gentleman, Portrait of Master Ward
- Francis Cotes (Portrait of Anne Sawbridge)
- Henry Raeburn (Portrait of Mrs. MacLean of Kinlochaline)
- Martin Archer Shee (Portrait of Mr Storer, Portrait of Anthony Gilbert Storer)
- John Watson Gordon (Portrait of an English Gentleman)
- John Opie (Portrait of a Gentleman)
- John Hoppner (Portrait of an Unknown Lady, Portrait of Mrs. Thornton)
- Thomas Hudson (Portrait of a Lady with her Daughter)
- John Francis Rigaud (The three favorite air travelers)
- William Beechey (Portrait of gentleman).
- Nelly Harvey (Portrait of Susan Baverstock, mother of the artist, 1906, moved to the Prado in 2016 from the Museo Nacional Centro de Arte Reina Sofía)

=== Landscape ===
- Nicholas Pocock (Landscape with a Man on a Horse)
- David Roberts (The Castle of Alcalá de Guadaíra, The Torre del Oro, Interior of the Cordoba Mosque, The Celebration of the Holy Cross in the Capilla del Condestable)
- Edwin Hayes (Seascape)

=== Other ===
- Lawrence Alma-Tadema (A Pompeian Scene, or The Siesta, donated in 1887 by Ernesto Gambart to the Museum of Modern Art and moved to the Prado in 1971 on that museum's closure)

== Gallery ==
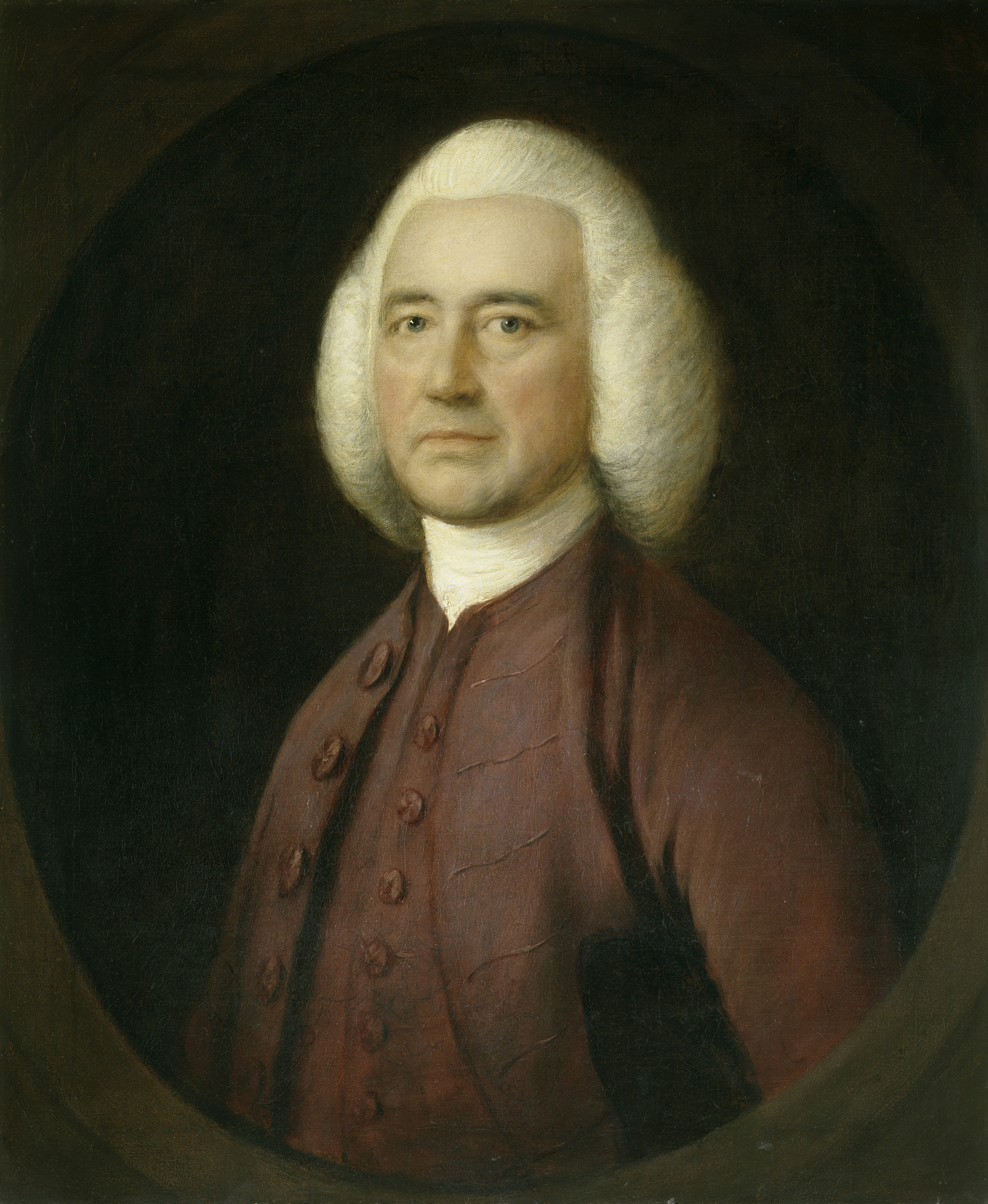
Robert Butcher of Walthamstow by Thomas Gainsborough.

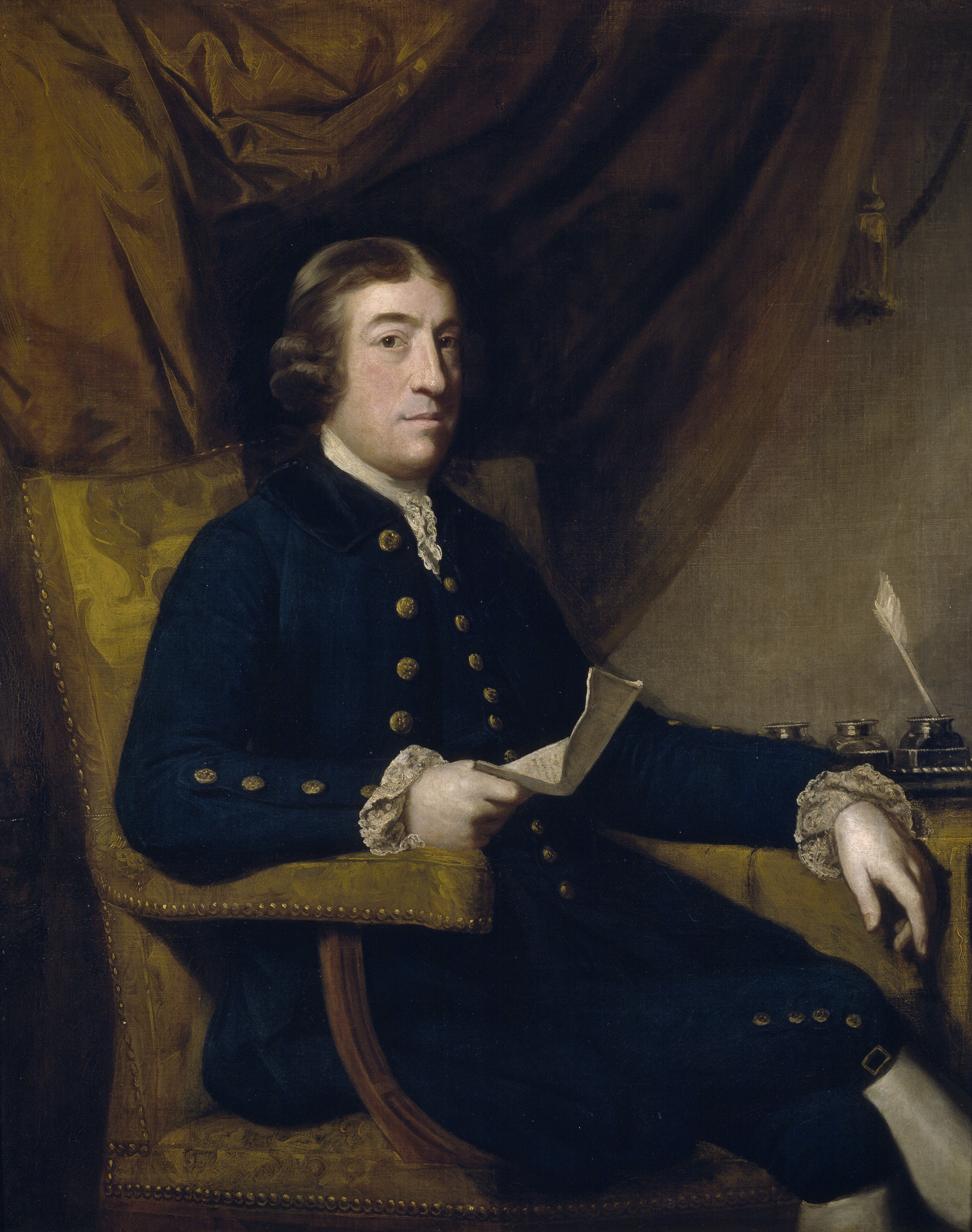
Mr. James Bourdieu by Joshua Reynolds, donated by Frederick Mont and Bertram Newhouse.

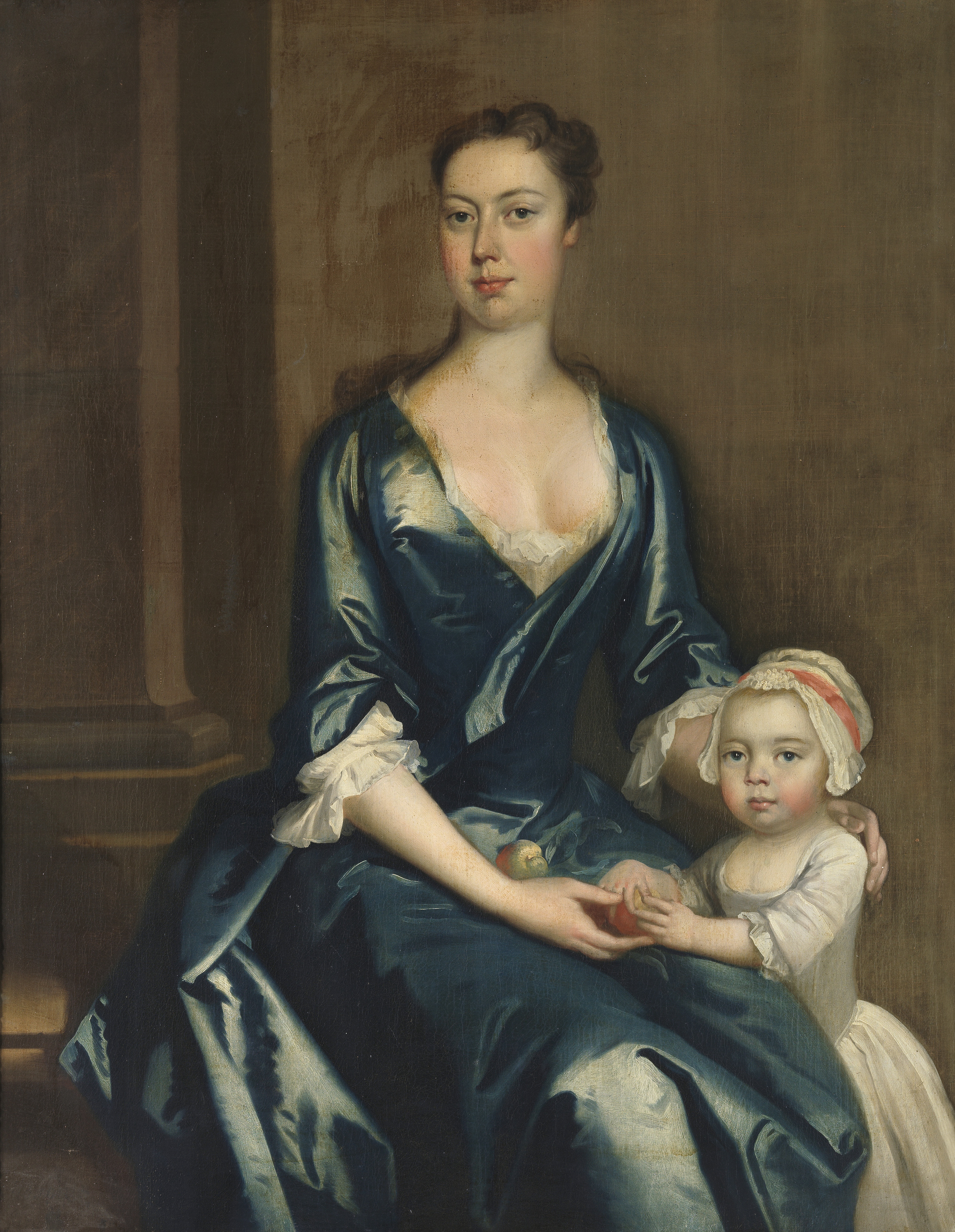
Portrait of a Lady with her Daughter, Thomas Hudson.

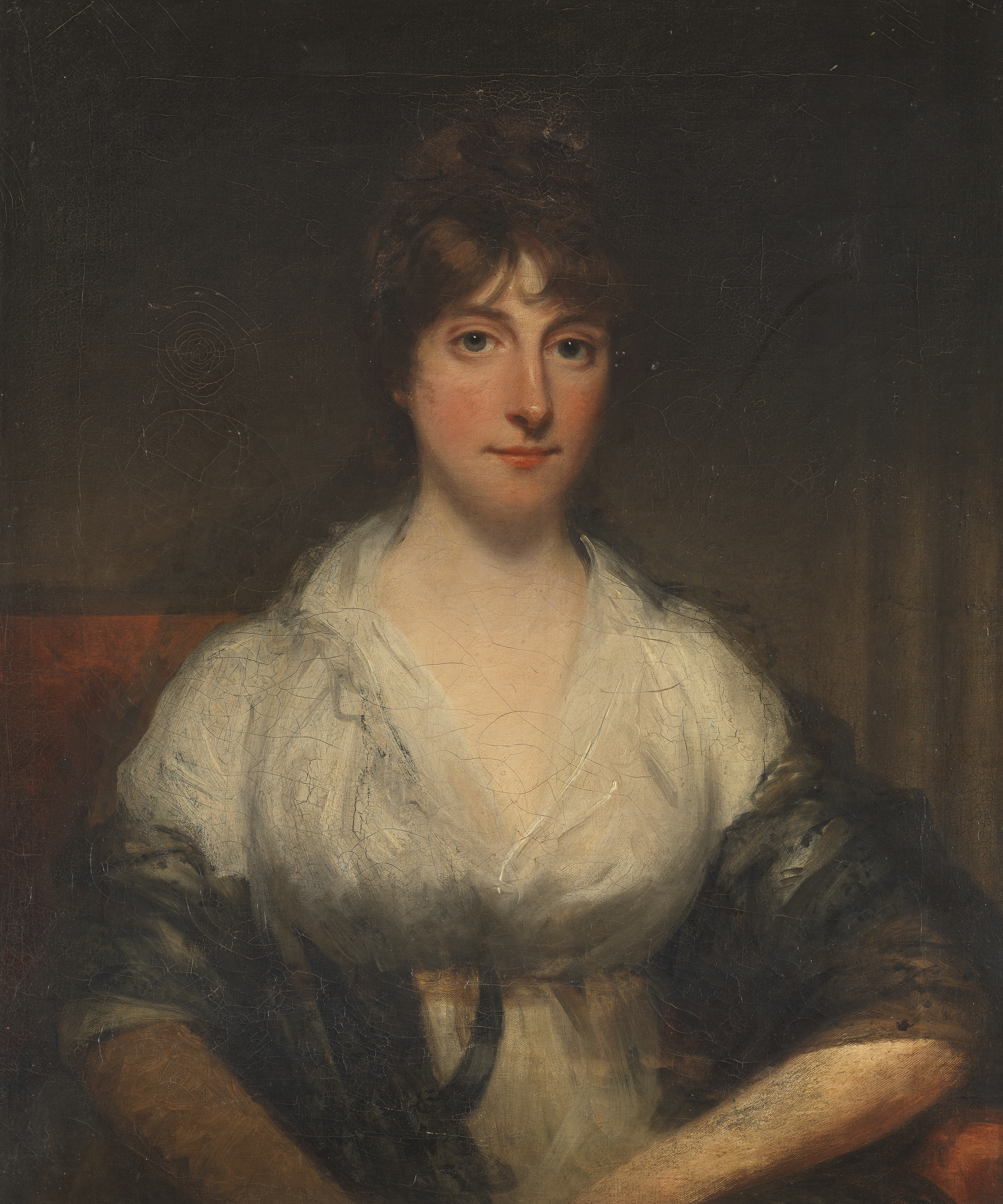
Mrs. Thornton, John Hoppner (donated by Jan G. Appleby).

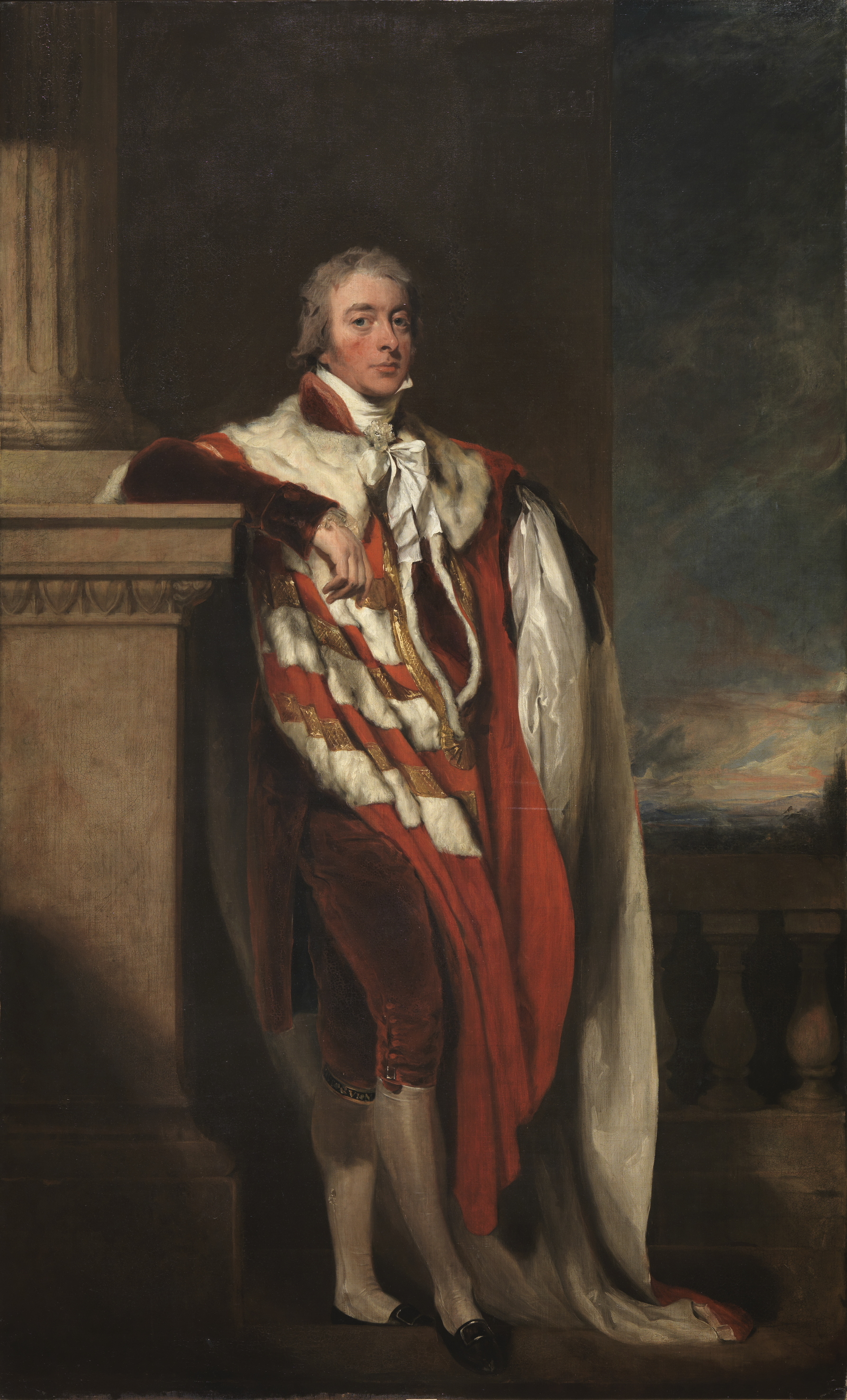
Portrait of Lord Westmoreland, circa 1806, by Thomas Lawrence.

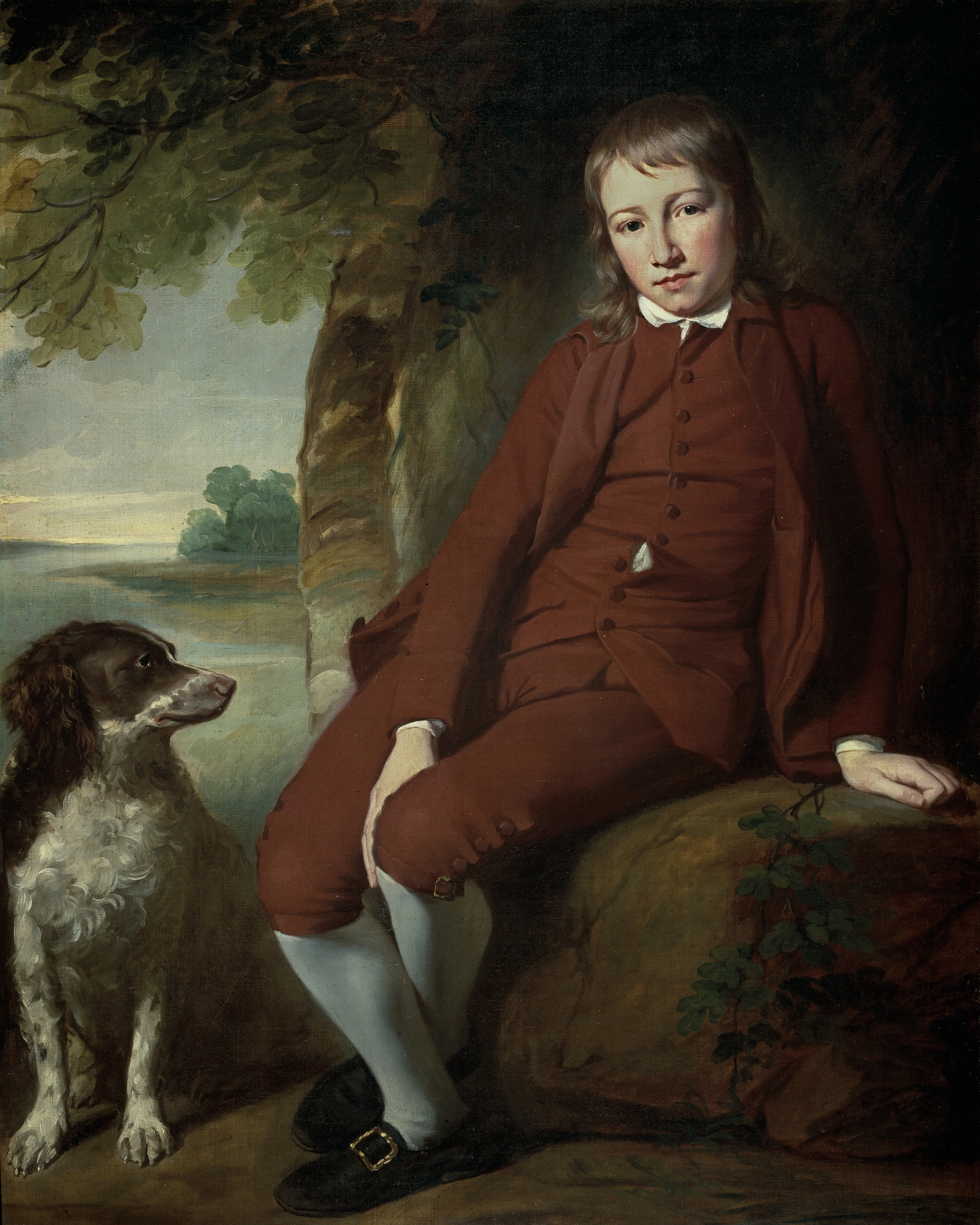
Master Ward by George Romney.

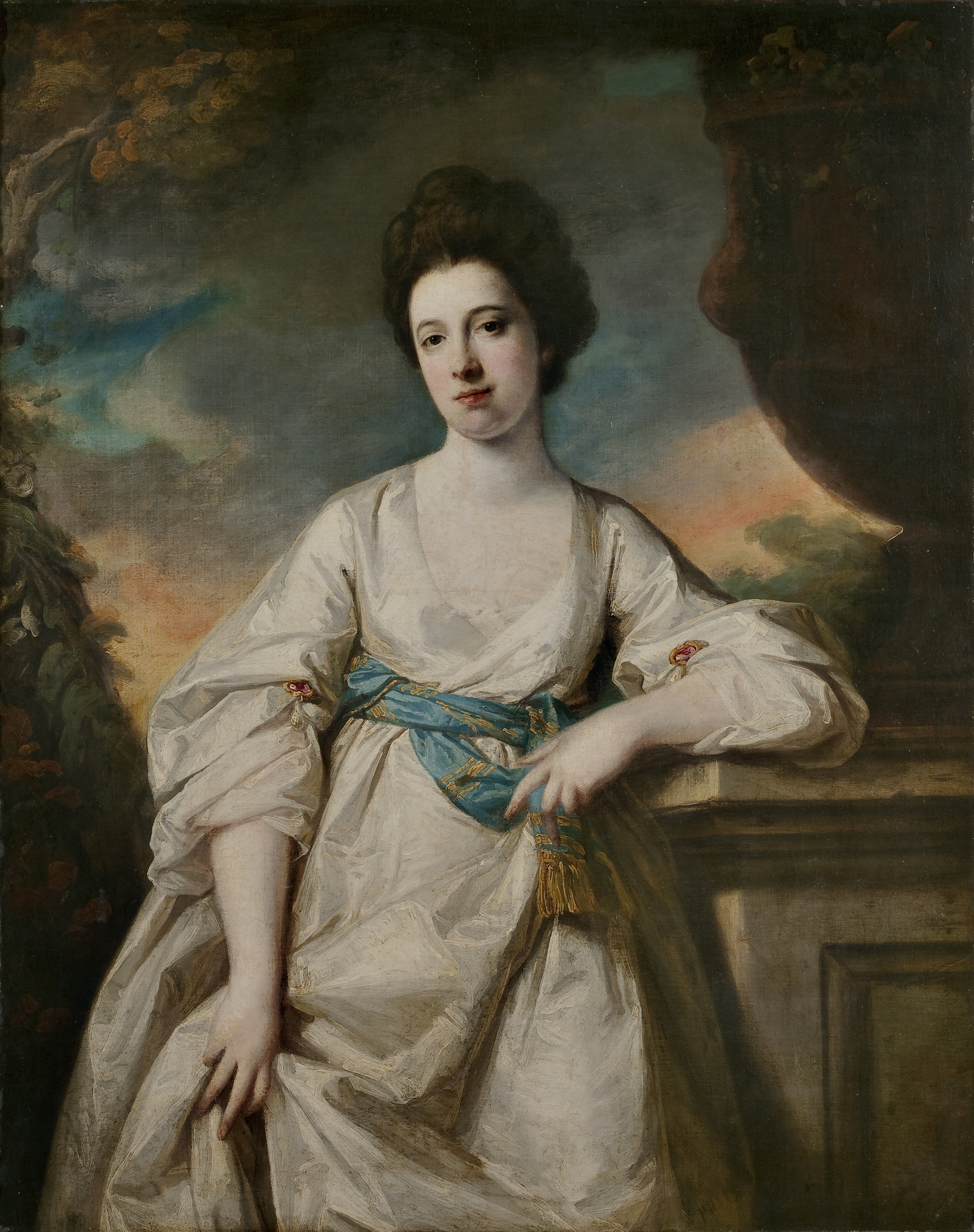
Anne Sawbridge (Francis Cotes).

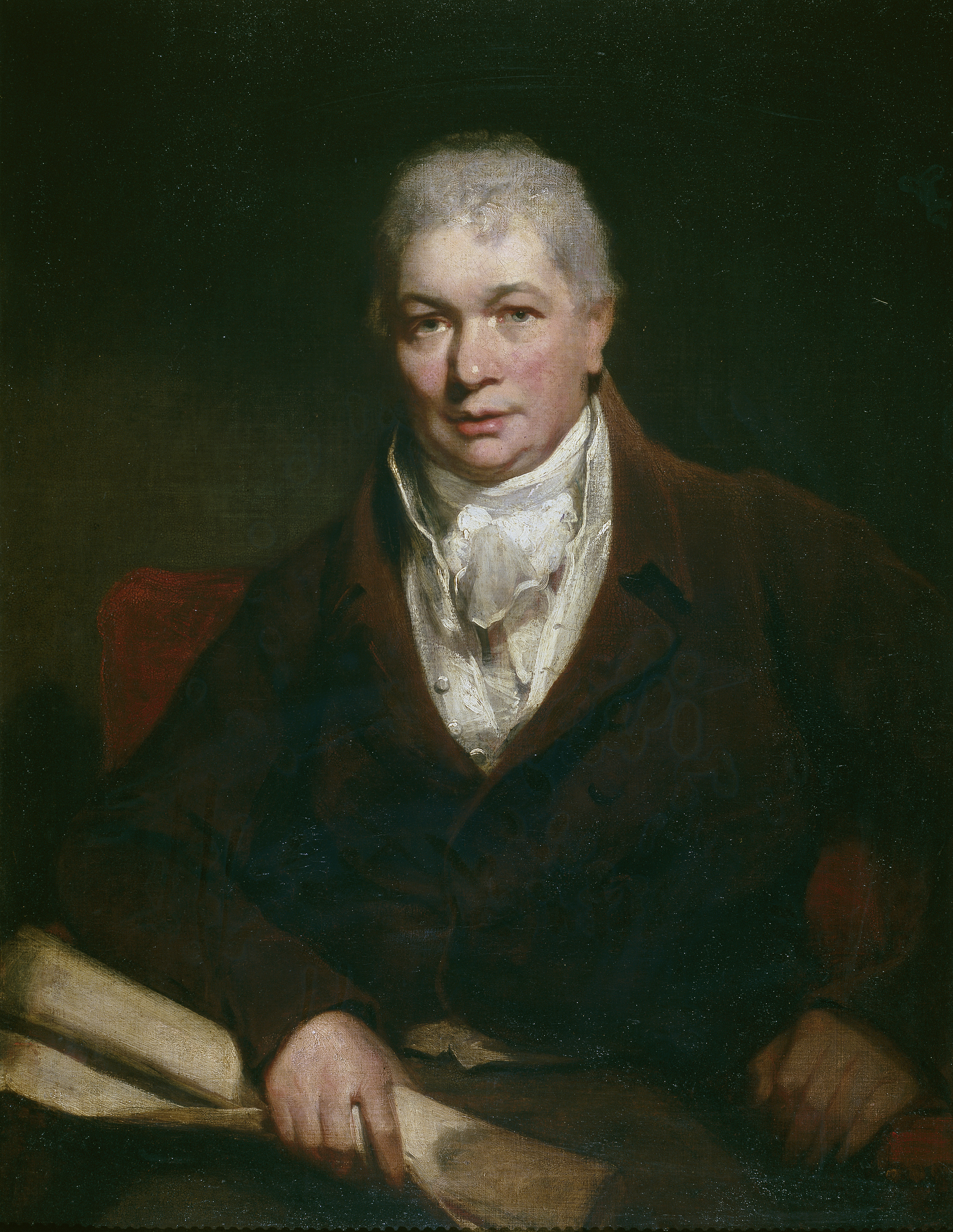
Portrait of a Knight by John Opie.

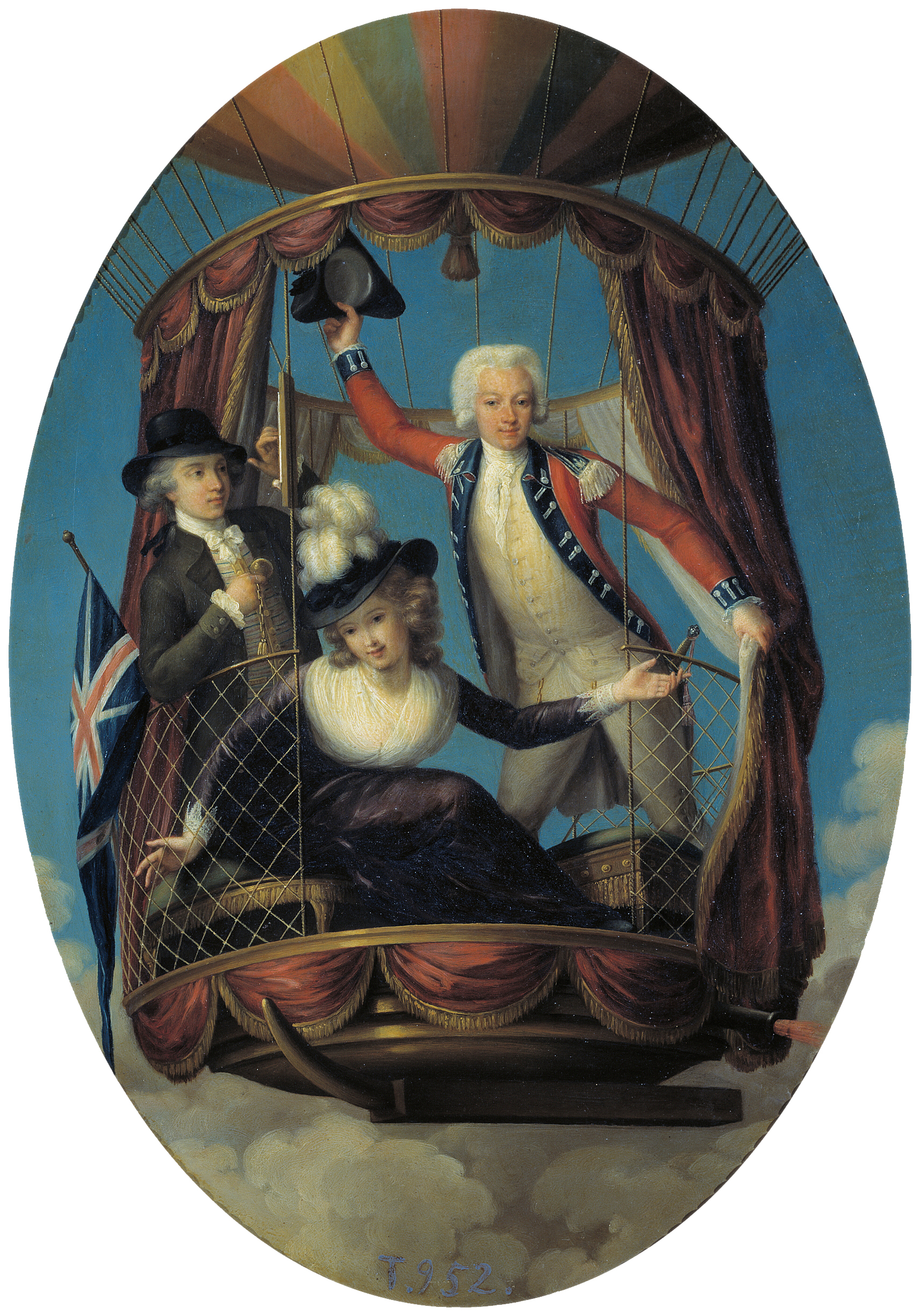
The Three Favourite Aerial Travellers (John Francis Rigaud) (donated by the dowager duchess of Pastrana).

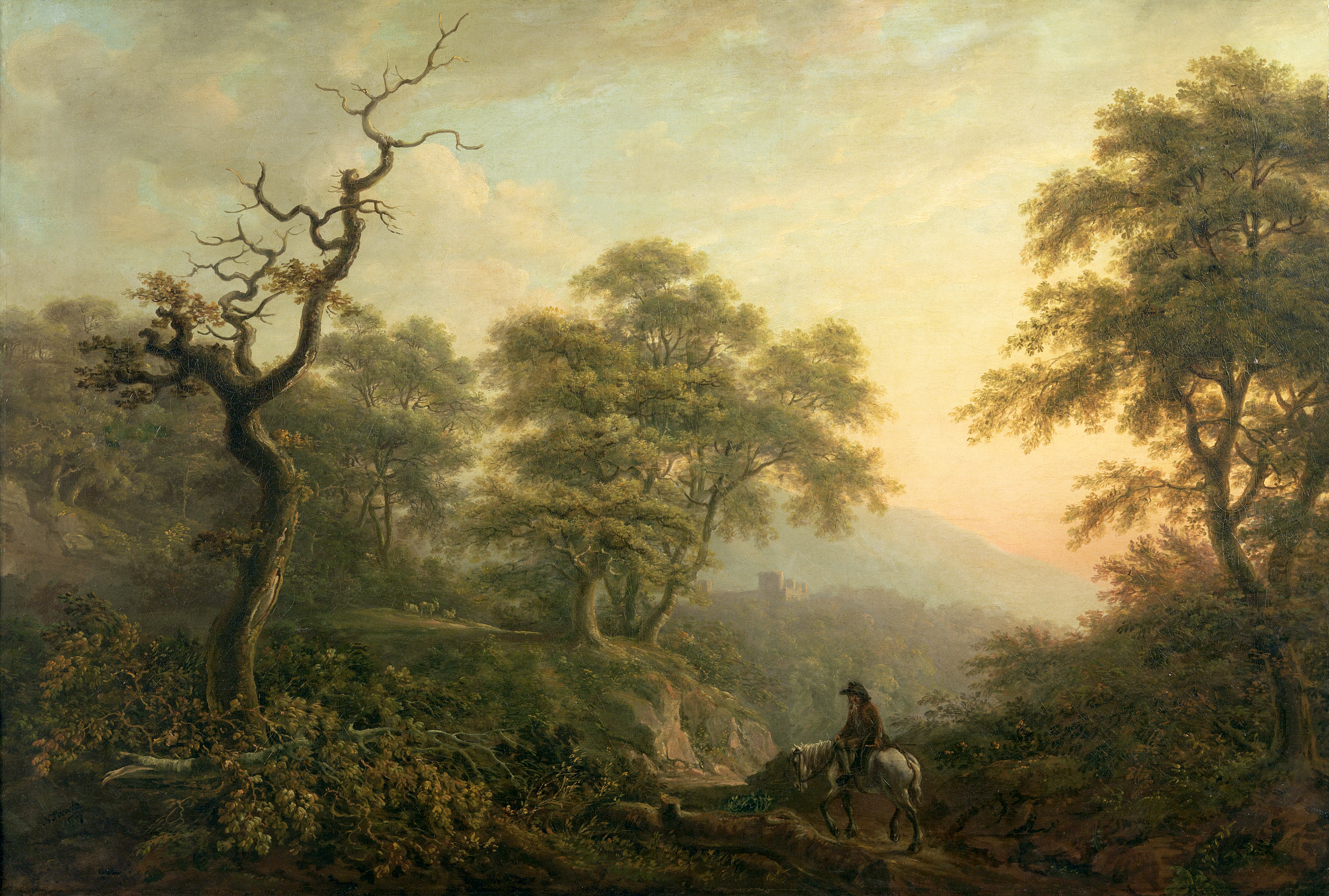
Landscape with a Man on a Horse by Nicholas Pocock (donated by Lady Ghislane Foley).

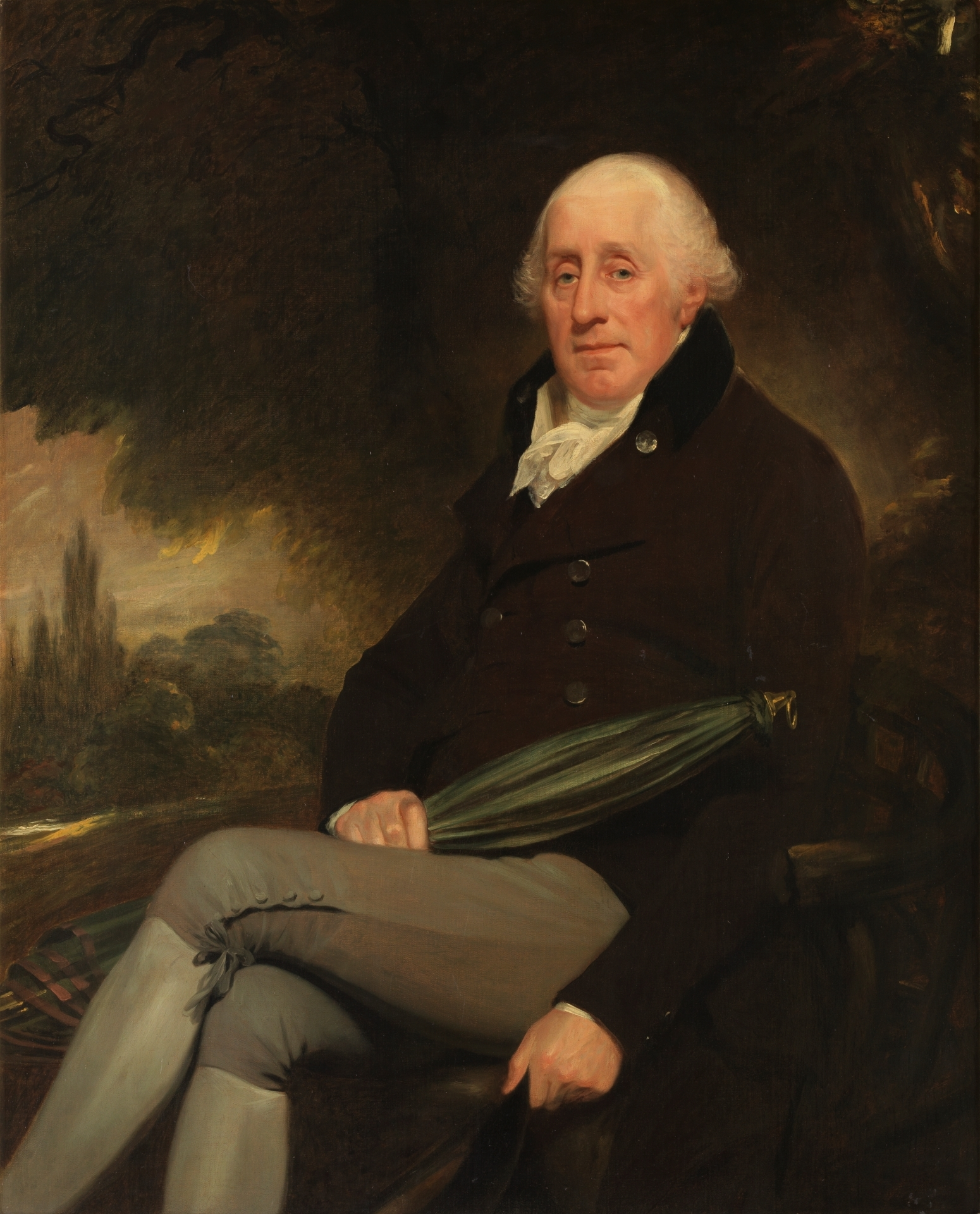
Portrait of a Gentleman, by William Beechey, circa 1795 (donated by Giles Earle).

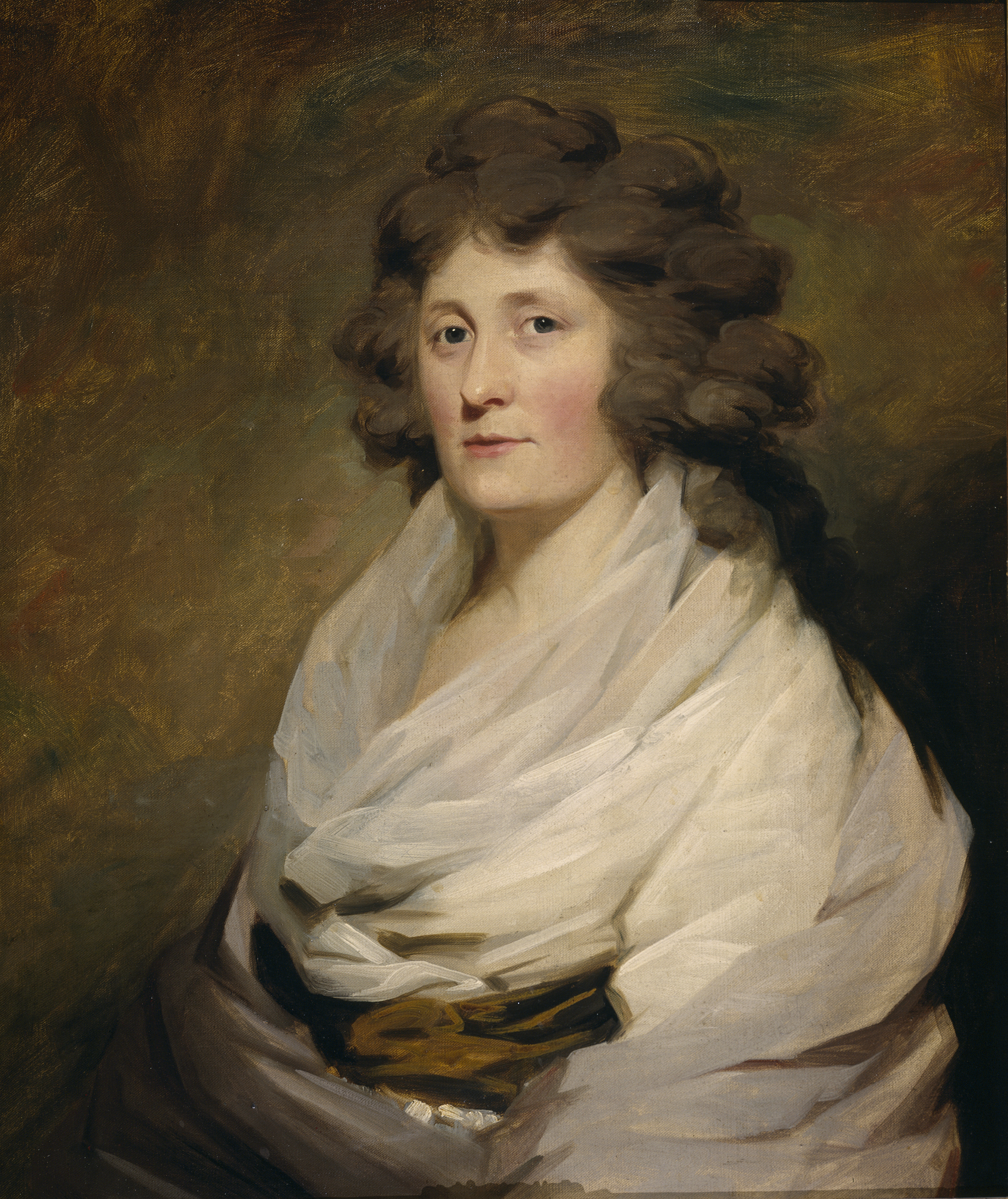
Mrs. MacLean of Kinlochaline by Henry Raeburn.

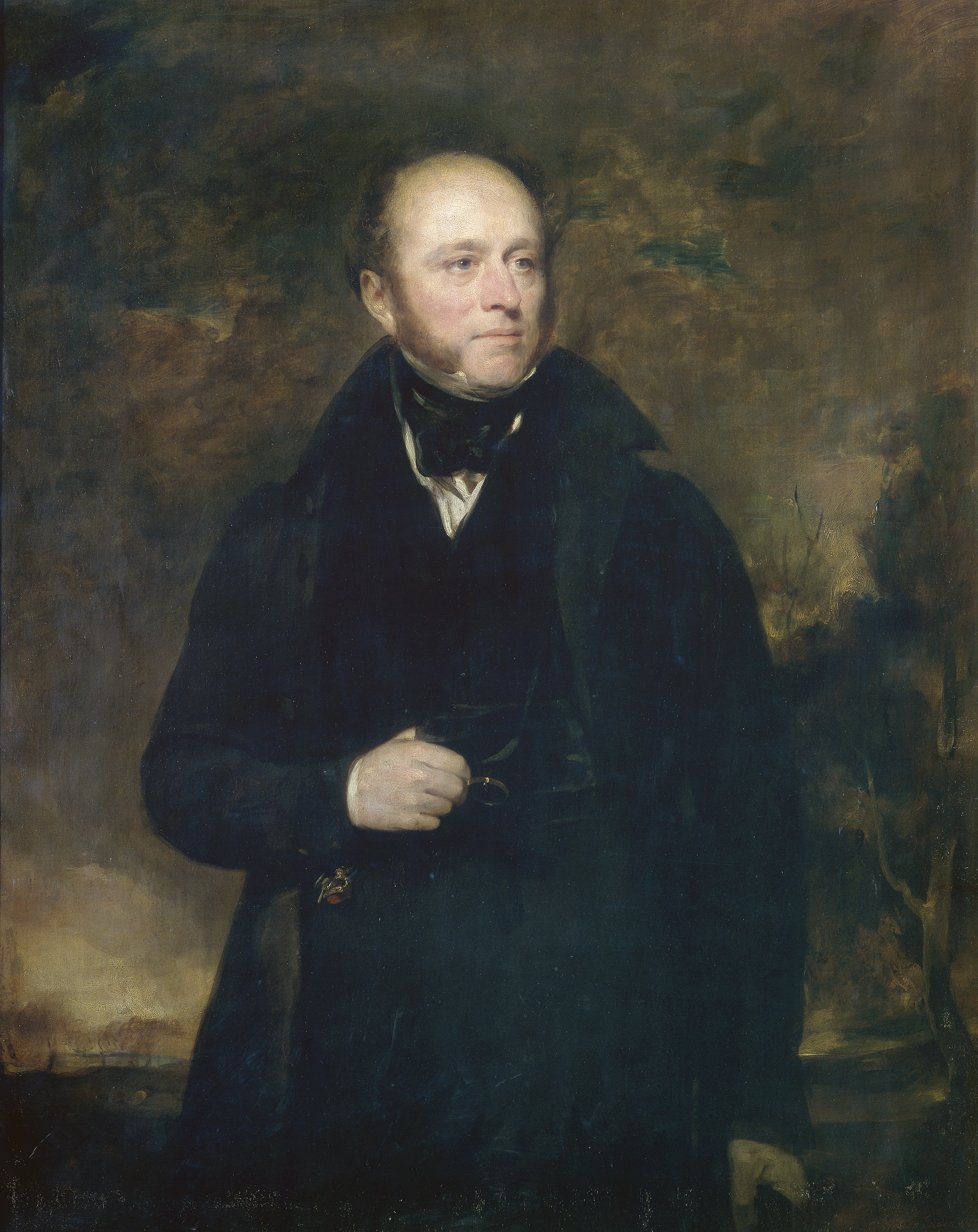
An English Knight, John Watson Gordon (donated by Manuel de Arpe y Retamino).

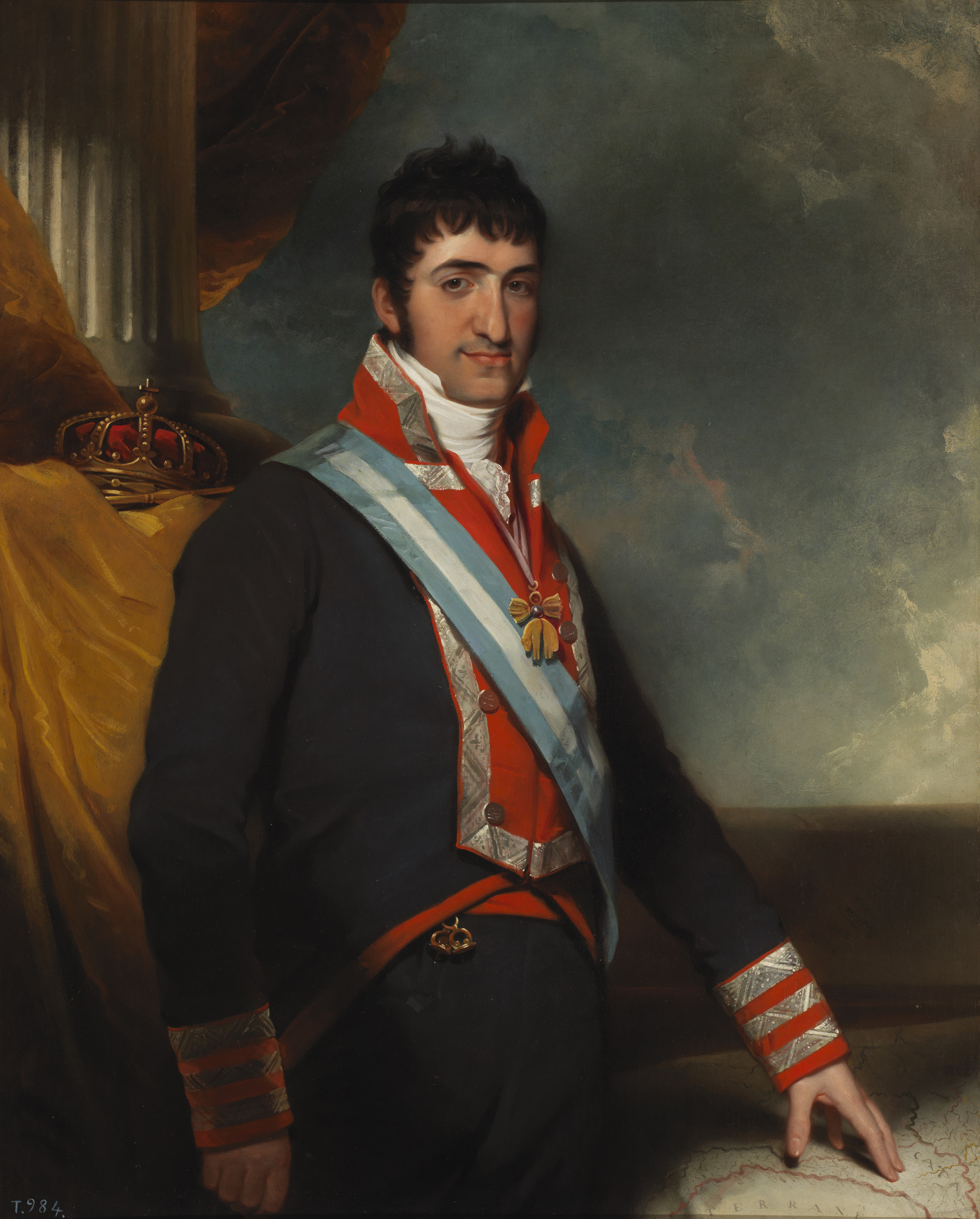
Fernando VII, King of Spain, 1814, William Collins (doubtful attribution) (donated by the dowager duchess of Pastrana).

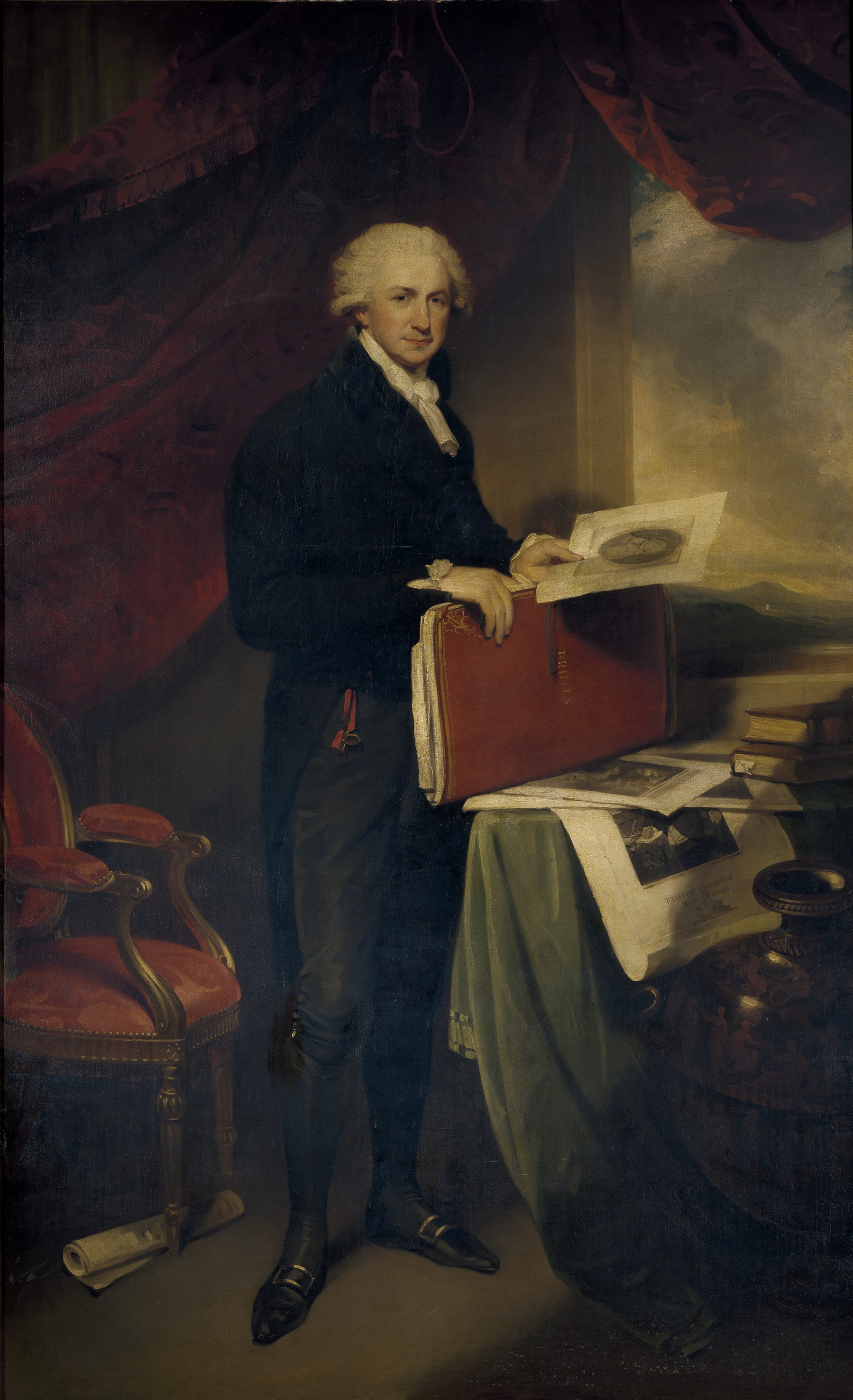
Portrait of Mr. Storer (Martin Archer Shee).

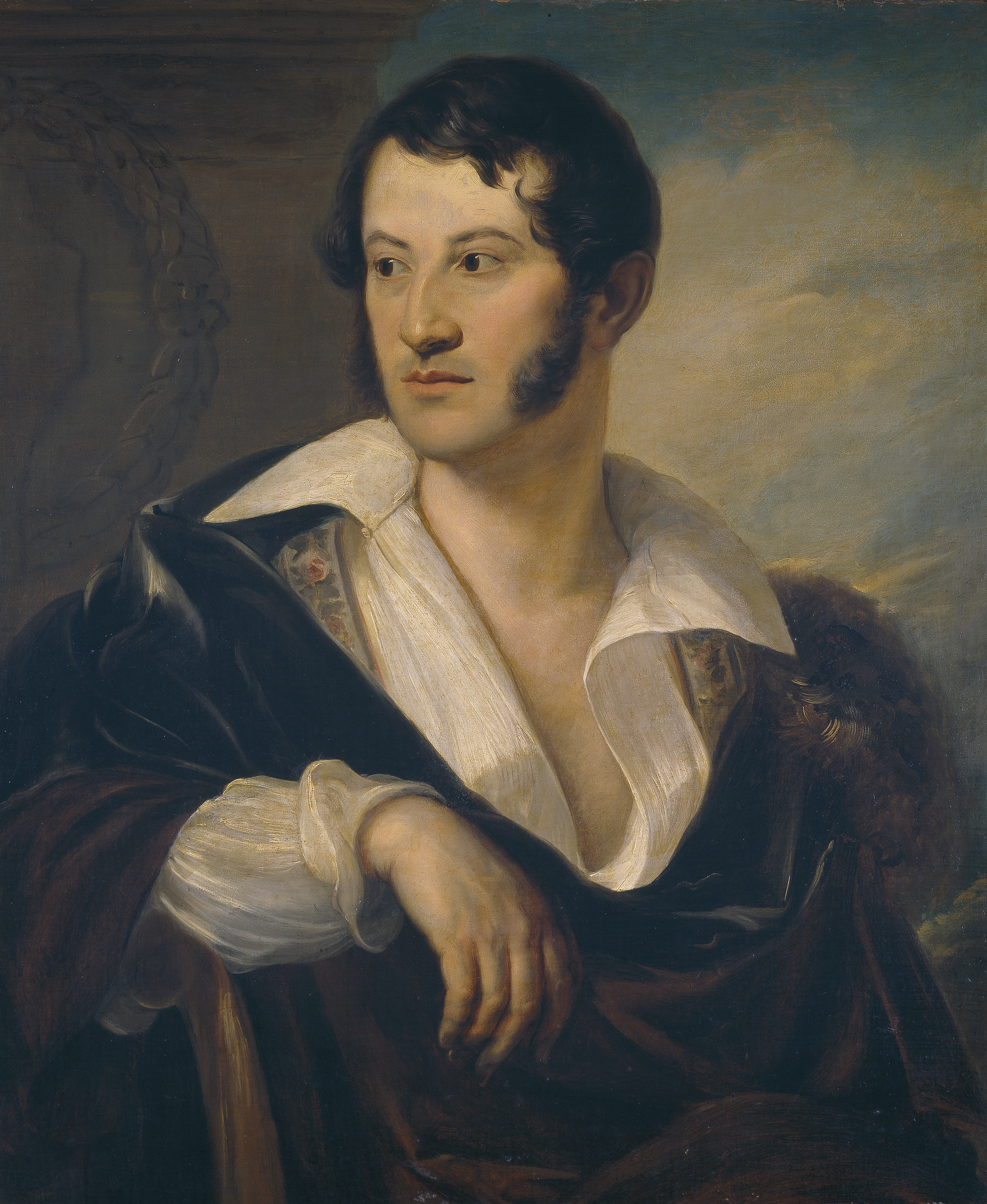
John Phillip (attributed): Gonzalo de Vilches, 1st conde de Vilches (?), 1835–1840. (bequeathed by the conde de la Cimera)

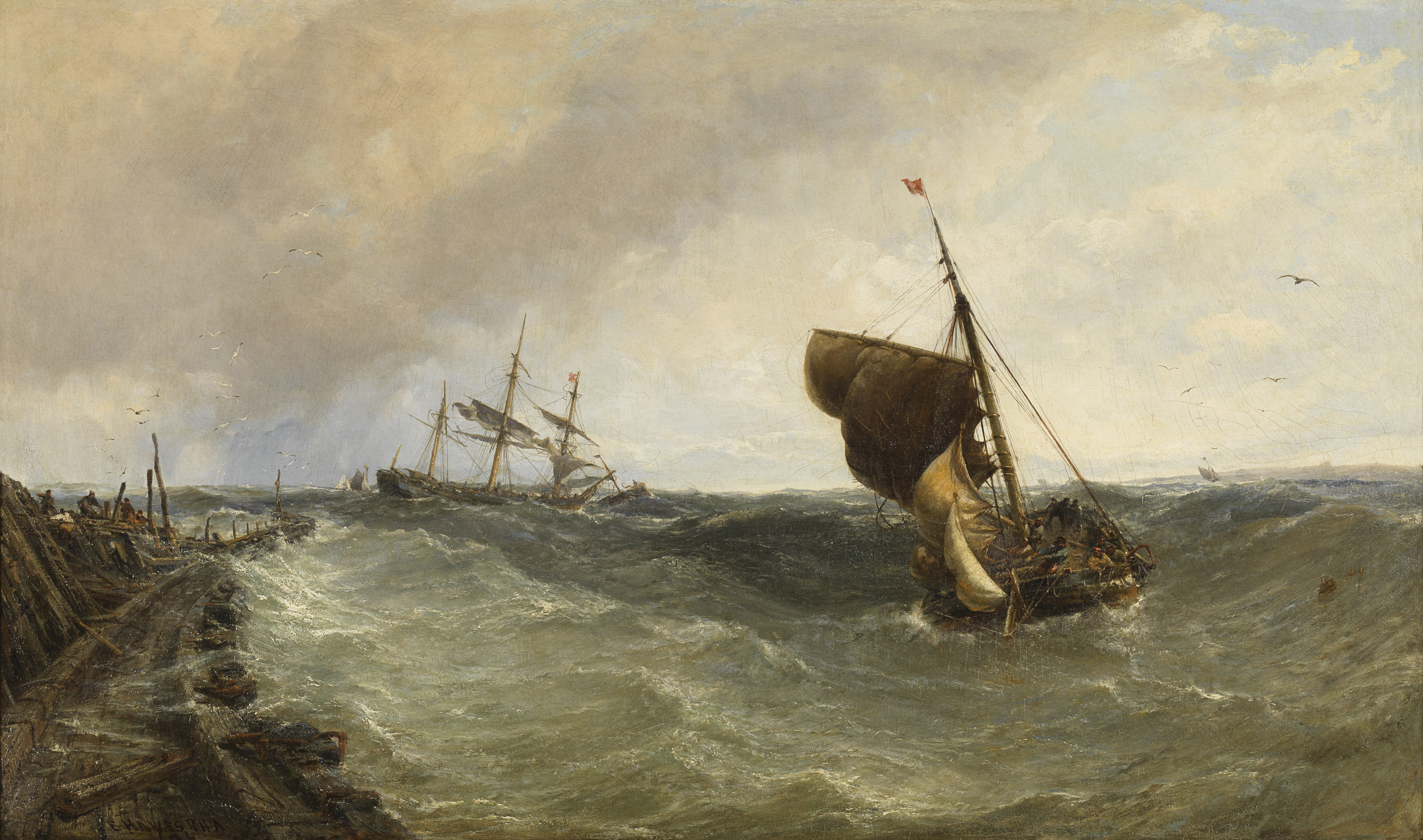
Seascape, Edwin Hayes, 1876 (donated by Manuel de Arpe y Retamino)

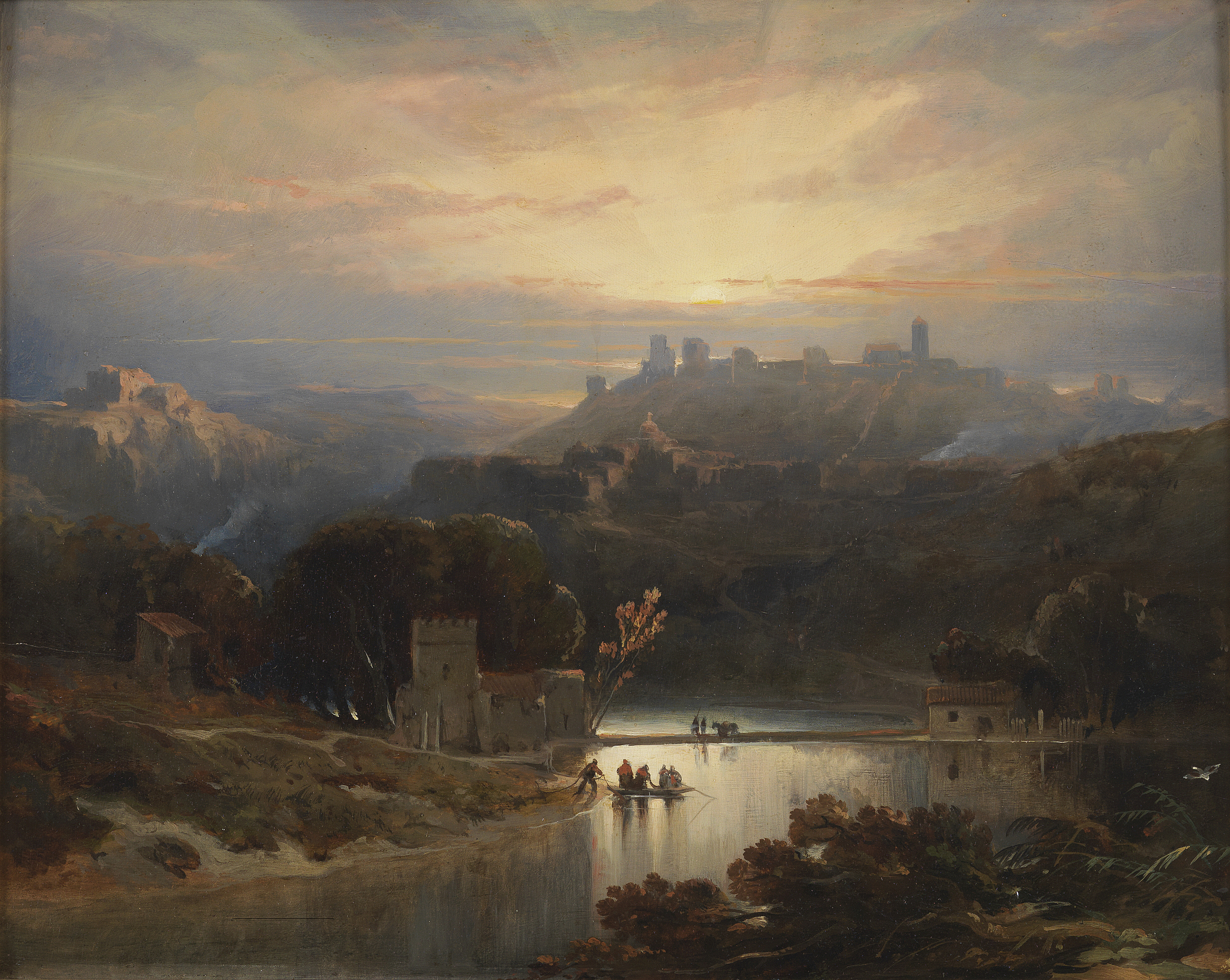
The Castle of Alcalá de Guadaíra, 1833, by David Roberts.

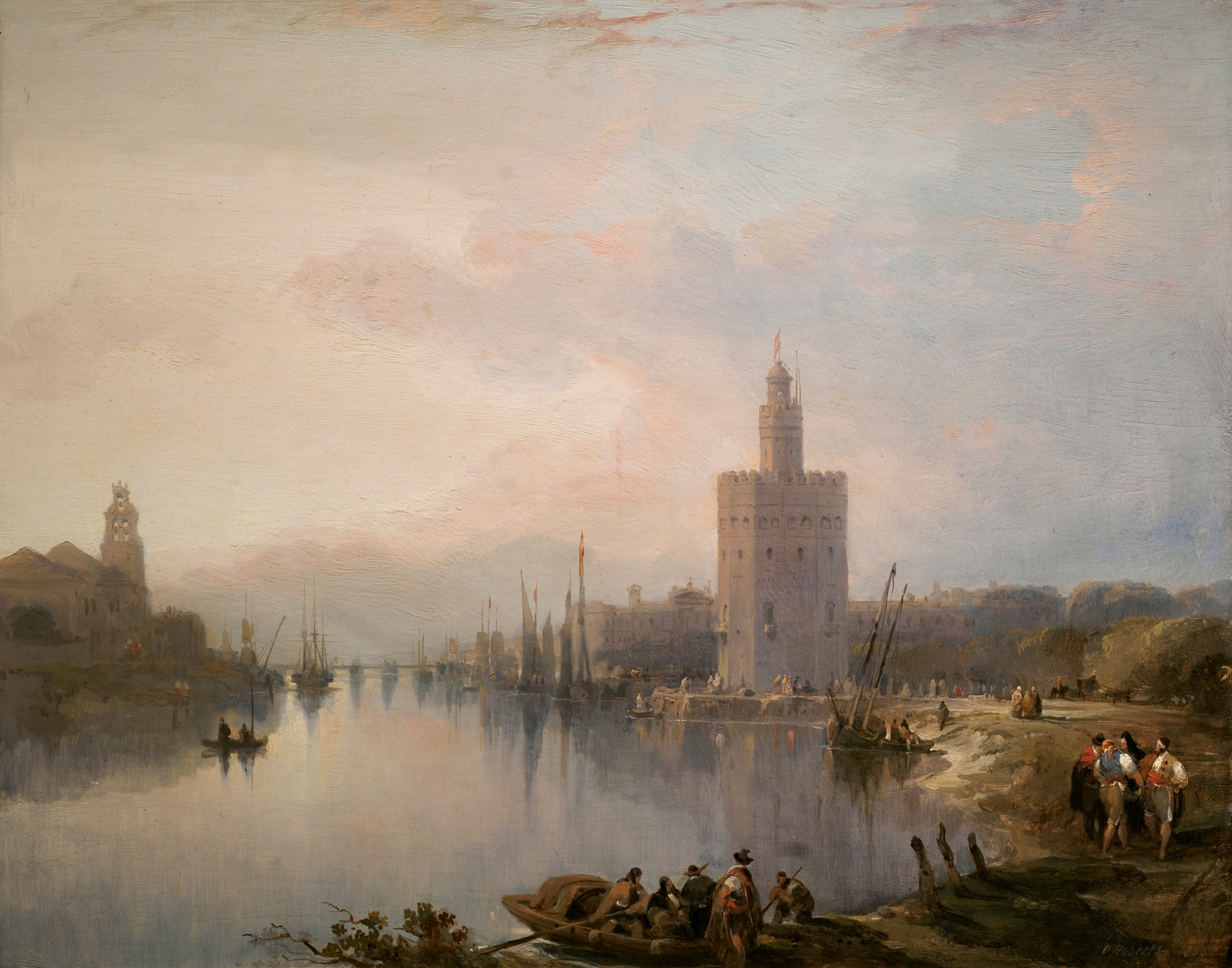
The Torre del Oro, 1833, by David Roberts.

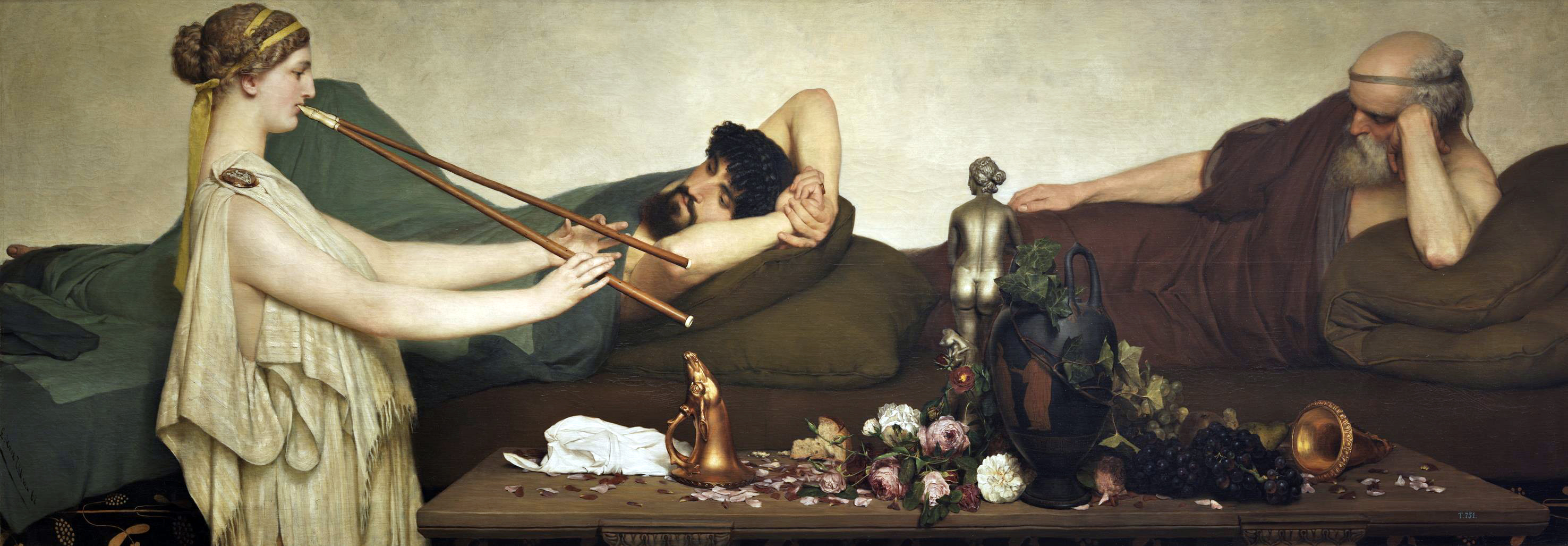
Pompeian Scene or The Siesta by Lawrence Alma-Tadema (donated by Ernesto Gambart).

== Bibliography ==
- (in Spanish) Jiménez-Blanco, María Dolores (editor) (mayo de 2009 -2ª edición revisada-). La Guía del Prado. Museo Nacional del Prado Difusión. ISBN 978-84-8480-165-8.
- (in Spanish) Luna Novicio, Juan José (1997). «Pintura británica». En Luna Novicio, Juan José; Úbeda de los Cobos, Andrés. Pintura europea del siglo XVIII. Guía (1ª edición). Madrid: Museo del Prado. pp. 175 - 192. ISBN 84-87317-65-0.
- (in Spanish) Varios autores (1996). Museo del Prado: Catálogo de las pinturas. Madrid: Ministerio de Educación y Cultura. ISBN 84-87317-53-7.
