= The Castle of Alcalá de Guadaíra =

Painting by David Roberts

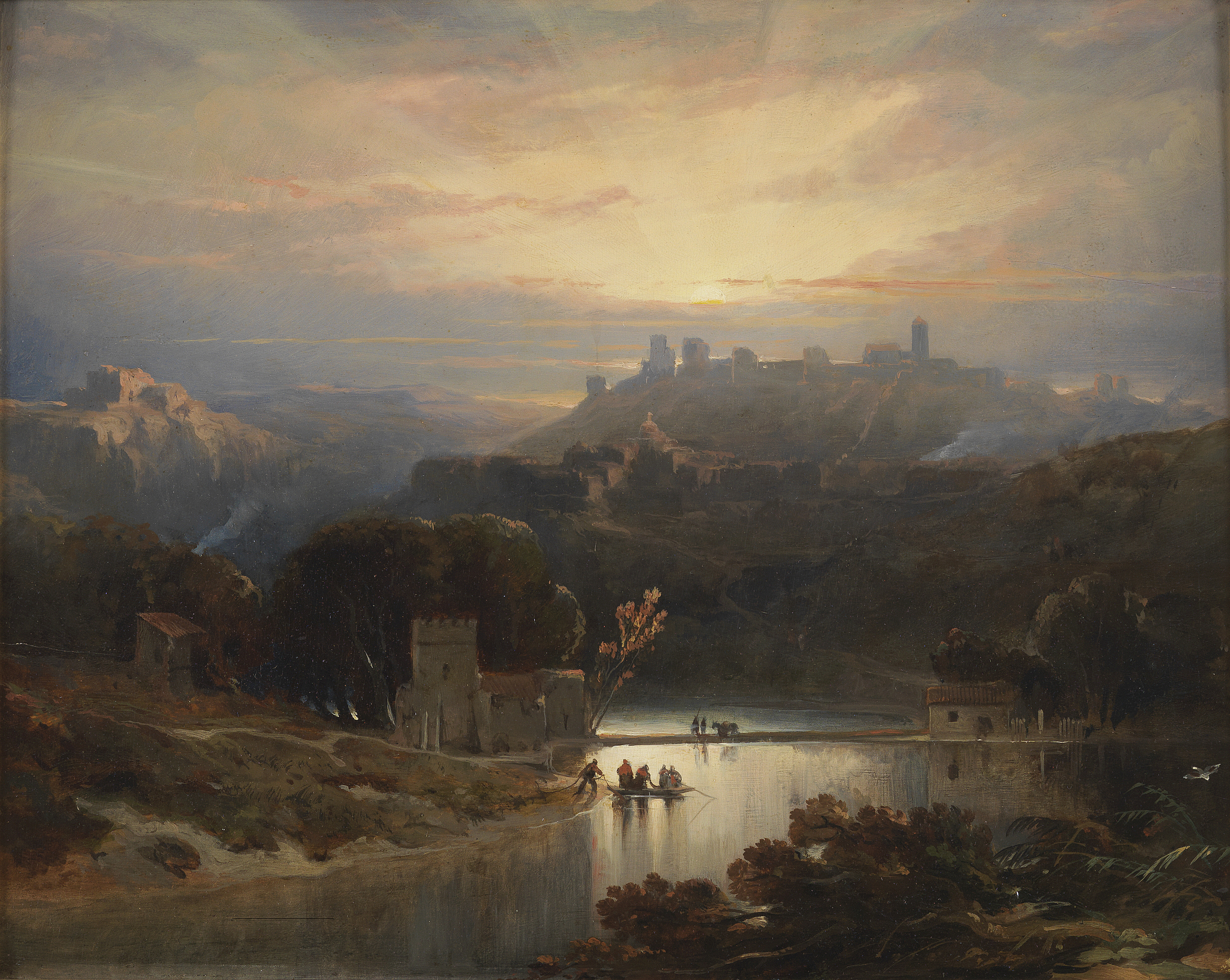
- Artist: David Roberts
- Year: 1833
- Type: Oil on panel, landscape painting
- Dimensions: 40 cm × 48 cm (16 in × 19 in)
- Location: Museo del Prado, Madrid

The Castle of Alcalá de Guadaíra (Spanish: El Castillo de Alcalá de Guadaíra) is an 1833 landscape painting by the British artist David Roberts. It depicts a panoramic distant view of the town of Alcalá de Guadaíra near Seville in Andalusia, with the ruins of the fourteenth century castle beyond it.

Roberts made his name as a scenic designer at the Theatre Royal, Drury Lane before enjoying success as a Romantic landscape painter. He toured Spain in 1832-33 and produced a number of pictures based on the experience. The painting is now in the Museo del Prado in Madrid.

== Bibliography ==
- Díez, García. The Nineteenth Century in the Prado. T.F. Editores, 2008.
- Hopkins, Claudia. Art and Identity in Spain, 1833–1956: The Orient Within. Bloomsbury, 2024.
- Sim, Katherine. David Roberts R.A., 1796–1864: A Biography. Quartet Books, 1984.
