= Portrait of Lord Westmoreland =

1806 painting by Thomas Lawrence

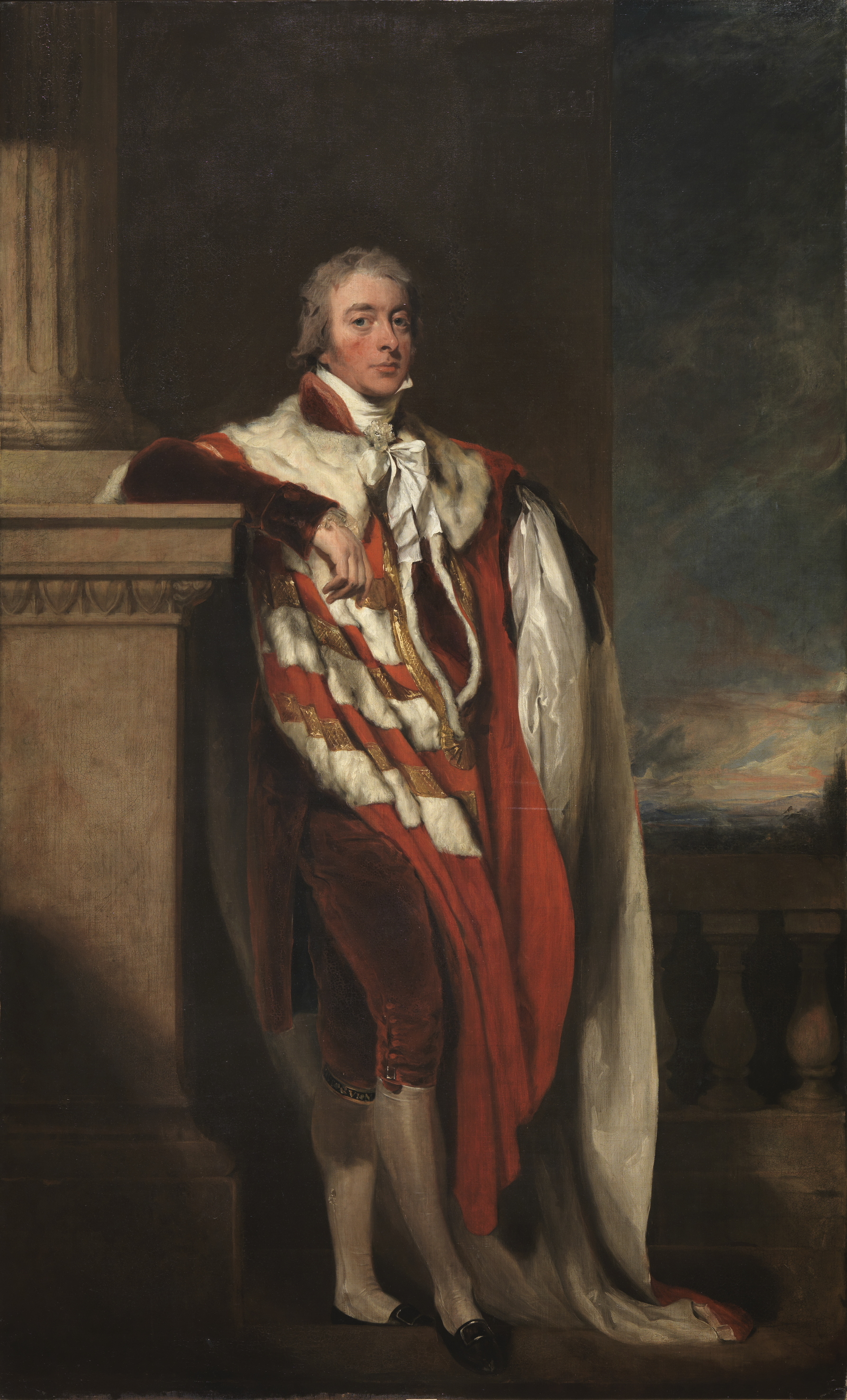
- Artist: Thomas Lawrence
- Year: c. 1806
- Type: Oil on canvas, portrait painting
- Dimensions: 247 cm × 147 cm (97 in × 58 in)
- Location: Museo del Prado; Madrid

Portrait of Lord Westmoreland is an 1806 portrait painting by the English artist Thomas Lawrence. It depicts the British politician John Fane, Earl of Westmorland. Westmoreland was a Tory peer who served in government throughout the Regency era. After serving as Lord Lieutenant of Ireland he spent many years in the cabinet as Lord Privy Seal, beginning during the premiership of William Pitt the Younger.

The Earl is shown in the robes of the House of Lords leaning in a neoclassical pose against a pillar. Today the painting is in the collection of the Prado Museum in Madrid, having been acquired in 1955.

== Bibliography ==
- Albinson, Cassandra, Funnell, Peter & Peltz, Lucy. Thomas Lawrence: Regency Power and Brilliance. Yale University Press, 2010.
- Clavell, Javier Costa. Prado Museum: Foreign Painting. Escudo de Oro, 1977.
- Evans, Eric J, The Forging of the Modern State: Early Industrial Britain, 1783-1870. Routledge, 2014.
- Goldring, Douglas. Regency Portrait Painter: The Life of Sir Thomas Lawrence. Macdonald, 1951.
- Levey, Michael. Sir Thomas Lawrence. Yale University Press, 2005.
- Sancho, José Luis. Guide Museo Del Prado. Aldeasa, 2000.
